= Timeline of Brest, France =

The following is a timeline of the history of the city of Brest, France.

== To AD 1500 ==
- 4th century AD – Port named as Osismis in the Notitia Dignitatum.
- AD 856 – Town name recorded as Bresta.
- 1060s – Moat dug around the Château de Brest (approximate date).
- 1240 – Ceded by a count of Léon to John I, Duke of Brittany
- 14th C. – Tour Tanguy built (approximate date).
- 1342 – 18 August: Battle of Brest (1342).
- 1386 – Siege of Brest (1386)

== 1500–1900 ==
- 16th C. Château de Brest construction concluded.
- 1512 – 10 August: Naval Battle of Saint-Mathieu occurs offshore.
- 1631 – Richelieu constructed a harbour with wooden wharves.
- 1680/88 – Sébastien Le Prestre de Vauban fortified the harbour.
- 1694 – (18 June) Battle of Camaret, an English squadron under John Berkeley, 3rd Baron Berkeley of Stratton, was miserably defeated.
- 1702 – Saint-Louis de Brest Church consecrated.
- 1749 – Saint-Sauveur Church built in Recouvrance.
- 1751 – Brest Prison built.
- 1752 – Académie de Marine founded.
- 1783 – Questel Fort built.
- 1784 – Fort Montbarey built.
- 1793
  - 2 January: Childers Incident occurs in the Goulet de Brest.
  - Population: 24,180.
- 1794 – French fleet, under Villaret de Joyeuse, was beaten by the English Richard Howe, 1st Earl Howe
- 1805 – Prison de Pontaniou built.
- 1848
  - Phare du Petit Minou and Phare du Portzic (lighthouses) built.
  - Lycée de Brest (school) founded.
- 1851 – Chamber of Commerce established.

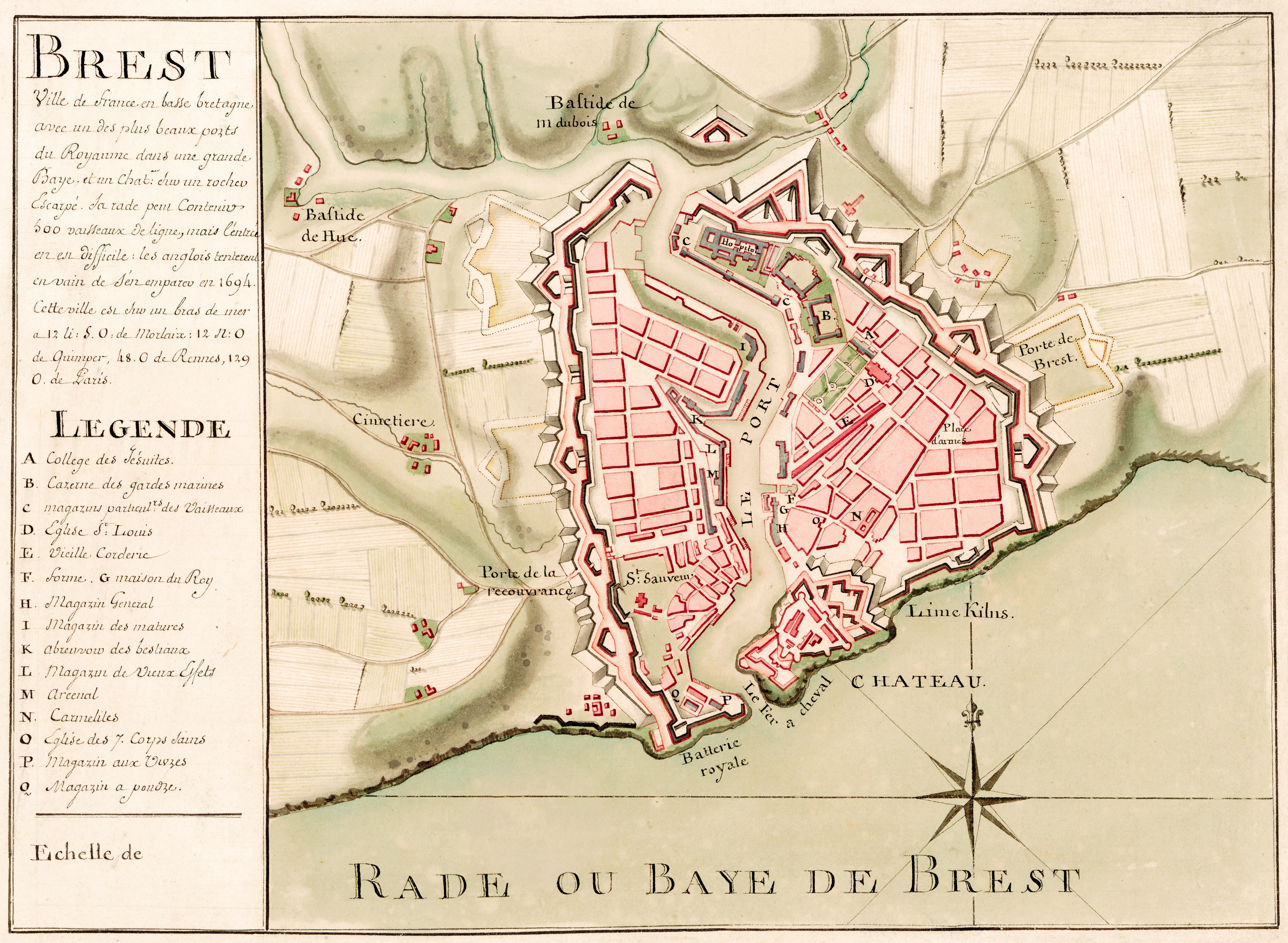
Brest in c. 1700

- 1858
  - Nantes-Brest canal begins operating.
  - Société académique de Brest founded.
- 1861 – Pont National (swing-bridge) built.
- 1865 – Paris–Brest railway begins operating.
- 1876 – Population: 66,828.
- 1882 – Société de géographie de Brest founded.
- 1886
  - La Dépêche de Brest newspaper begins publication.
  - Population: 70,778.
- 1898 – Brest tramway begins operating.

== 20th century ==
- 1903 – Tramways Électrique du Finistère begins operating.
- 1905 – AS Brestoise football club formed.
- 1911 – Population: 90,540.
- 1930 – Plougastel Bridge built near city.
- 1932 – Gare de Brest built.
- 1939 – Augustin-Morvan Hospital built.
- 1940
  - World War II begins.
  - Gegen Engeland German-language newspaper begins publication.
- 1942 – Brest submarine base built in the Arsenal.
- 1944
  - August: Battle for Brest begins.
  - 9 September: Sadi-Carnot explosion.
  - 18 September: Germans ousted by Allied forces.
- 1947
  - 28 July: Ocean Liberty explosion.
  - Brest trolleybus begins operating.
- 1951 – Pont de l'Harteloire (bridge) built.
- 1954
  - Pont de Recouvrance (bridge) built.
  - Société d'études de Brest et du Léon founded.
- 1957 – Bibus regional transit network created.
- 1958 – St. Louis Church, Brest rebuilt.
- 1959 – Georges Lombard becomes mayor.
- 1961 – Hôtel de Ville completed.
- 1970 – University of Western Brittany founded.
- 1973 – Rïnkla Stadium built.
- 1974 – Urban Community of Brest established.
- 1975 – Population: 166,826.
- 1976 – Dialogues (bookshop) in business.
- 1982
  - Pierre Maille becomes mayor.
  - Brest becomes part of the Brittany (administrative region).
- 1986 – Brest European Short Film Festival begins.
- 1997 – Socialist Party national congress held in Brest.

== 21st century ==
- 2001 – François Cuillandre becomes mayor.
- 2012
  - Brest tramway begins operating.
  - Population: 141,315.
- 2014 – Brest Arena built.
- 2016 – Brest aerial tram begins operating.
- 2017 – Les Ateliers des Capucins, a mall and cultural venue, opens.

== See also ==
- Brest history
- History of Brest, France
- List of mayors of Brest, France
- Timeline of Brittany

other cities in the Brittany region

- Timeline of Rennes
- Timeline of Vannes

== Bibliography ==
=== in English ===
- "Brest". Handbook for Travellers in France. London: John Murray. 1861.
- C.B. Black (1876). "Brest". Guide to the North of France. Edinburgh: Adam and Charles Black.
- "Brest". Northern France. Leipsic: Karl Baedeker. 1899. OCLC 2229516.
- "Brest" . Encyclopædia Britannica. Vol. 4 (11th ed.). 1910. p. 500.
- Benjamin Vincent (1910), "Brest", Haydn's Dictionary of Dates (25th ed.), London: Ward, Lock & Co., hdl:2027/loc.ark:/13960/t89g6g776

=== in French ===
- Eusèbe Girault de Saint-Fargeau [in French] (1850). "Brest". Guide pittoresque: portatif et complet, du voyageur en France (in French) (3rd ed.). Paris: Firmin Didot frères. p. 244. hdl:2027/uiug.30112081968700.
- Joanne, Paul (1890). "Brest". Bretagne. Guides Joanne (in French).
- "Brest". L'Armorique. À la France: sites et monuments (in French). Paris: Touring-Club de France. 1903. OCLC 457600236.
