= Recouvrance =

Recouvrance may refer to:

- Recouvrance, Territoire de Belfort, a village and commune in Territoire de Belfort, France
- Recouvrance, Brest, a district in Brest, France
- La Recouvrance (schooner)

== See also ==
- Pont de Recouvrance, a bridge in Recouvrance, Brest
- Banogne-Recouvrance, a commune in the Ardennes
