= Rue Saint-Malo =

Thoroughfare in Brest, France

Coordinates: 48°23′20.34″N 4°30′2.49″W

The Rue Saint-Malo and the "Vivre la Rue" Association

Rue Saint-Malo, the terrain de la Madeleine and the prison de Pontaniou

The Rue Saint-Malo (Breton: Straed Sant-Maloù) is a paved street in Brest, France. It is located in the Carpon valley, against the plateau des Capucins in the Recouvrance quarter. Only its lower half survives, as the oldest street in the city.

It runs along the wall of the terrain de la Madeleine, where a convent once stood that took in 'sinful women', and after the revocation of the edict of Nantes, Huguenots. It is lined with 17th- and 18th-century houses and is overlooked by terraced gardens. Beyond its fountain, the road runs into the levée de Pontaniou and ends in the staircase of the Madeleine, which leads to the plateau des Capucins.

== See also ==
- Rue de Siam
- Arsenal de Brest
