= Pont National (Brest) =

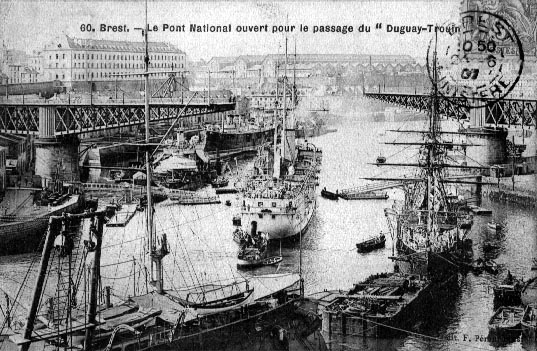
- The Pont National opened to allow through the French cruiser Duguay-Trouin, in 1901
- Coordinates: 48°23′03.7″N 04°29′47.3″W
- Carries: Rue de Siam
- Crosses: Penfeld
- Locale: Brest, Brittany, France

Characteristics
- Design: Swing bridge
- Material: Masonry, steel
- Total length: 104m

History
- Designer: Nicolas Cadiat (1805-1856); Alphonse Oudry (1819-1869); Schneider et Cie, builders
- Construction start: 1856
- Opened: 1861
- Closed: 1944 (destroyed)

Location
- Interactive map of Pont National

The Pont National was a swing bridge across the river Penfeld in Brest, France. It opened in 1861 and linked rue de Siam to Recouvrance, near the Tour Tanguy. It was destroyed by Allied bombardment in 1944 and was replaced by the Pont de Recouvrance in the 1950s.
