= Rouen Museum =

Rouen Museum may refer to

- Musée des Beaux-Arts de Rouen, a fine arts museum
- Muséum d'Histoire Naturelle de Rouen, a natural history museum
- Maritime, Fluvial and Harbour Museum of Rouen, a museum dedicated to the history of the port of Rouen
