= Brest Arsenal =

Naval and military base in France

- Interactive map of Brest Arsenal
- Location in France

Location
- Location: France
- Coordinates: 48°23′12″N 4°29′48″W

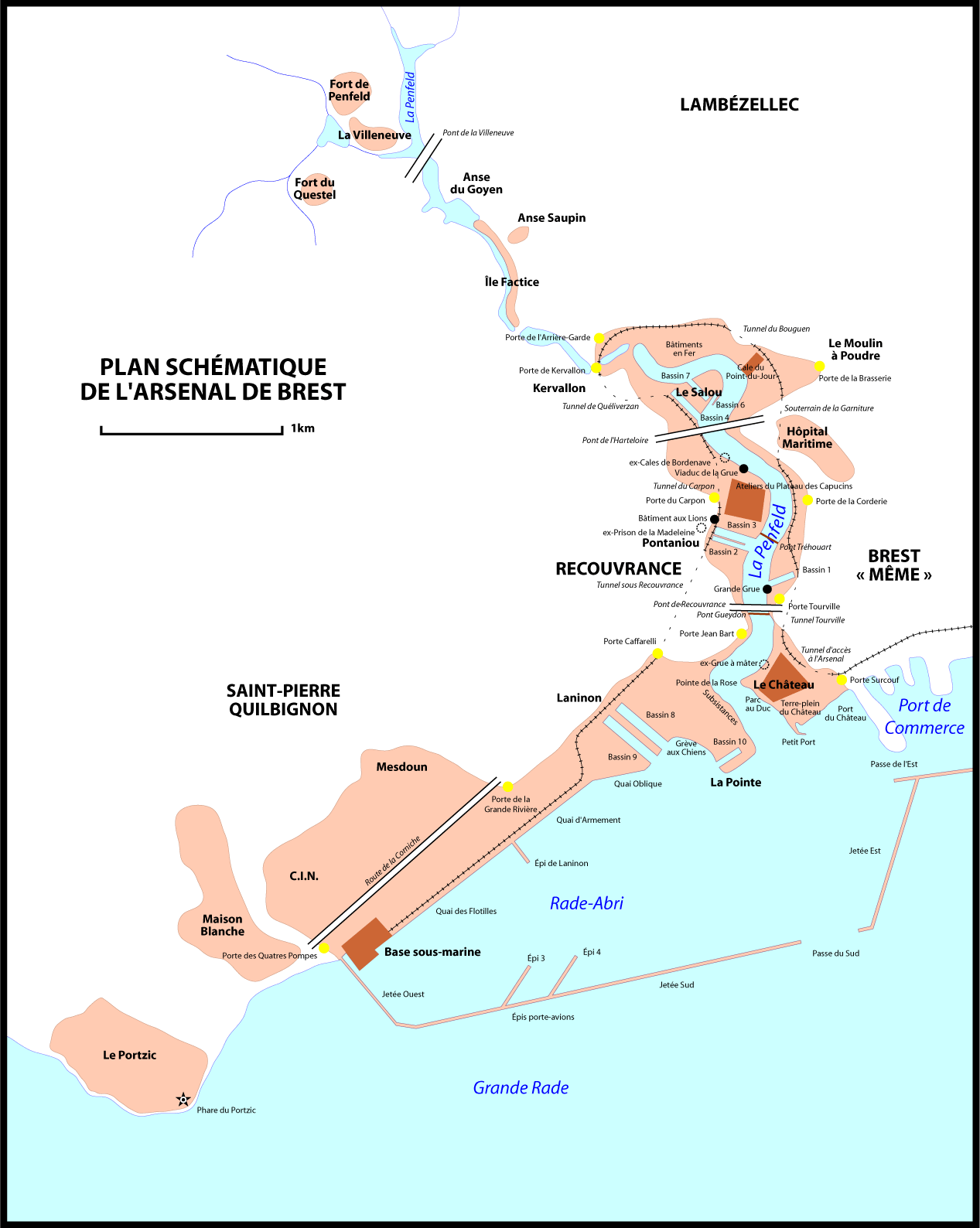
Schematic plan of the Arsenal de Brest

The Brest Arsenal (French: l'arsenal de Brest) is a naval base of the French Navy and a collection of naval and military buildings located on the banks of the river Penfeld, in the harbor of Brest, France. It is the second French naval base after the Toulon arsenal and before the Cherbourg Naval Base.

== Timeline ==
- 1631–1635 – Beginning of the foundations of the port infrastructure.
- 1674 – Appearance of the Powder Magazines, Cordellerie and Military Hospital.
- 1683 – Creation of the Troulan dock.
- 1746 – Creation of the three Pontaniou docks near the anchor forges and naval constructions.
- 1752 – Construction of the Bagne demolished in 1947.
- 1807 – Construction of the Bâtiment aux Lions to house the arsenal's magazines.
- 1822–1827 – Construction of Bassin 6 at the Salou.
- 1858 – Appropriation of the Tourville and Jean Bart quays by the navy.
- 1864–1865 – Construction of Bassin 7 at the Salou.
- 1865 – Closure of the Penfeld port to commercial boats, turning it into a military port.
- 1889–1896 – Construction of the South Jetty (1,500 m).
- 1895–1900 – Construction of the West Jetty (200 m).
- 1899–1902 – Transformation of the four Pontaniou docks into 2 large basins, now known as Basin 2 and Basin 3.
- 1900–1905 – South Jetty extended by 750 m.
- 1905 – Construction of the Quai d'Armement.
- 1910 – Installation of the Grande Grue.
- 1910–1916 – Digging of the two construction docks and of the Laninon dry dock, now known as Basin 8 and Basin 9.
- 1911 – Infilling of the terreplein of Brest Castle.
- 1918 – Construction of the Quai des Flottilles.
- 1931–1933 – Closure of the western passage.
- 1938 – Work begun on the construction of Bassin 10 de Laninon (work abandoned 1939–1945).

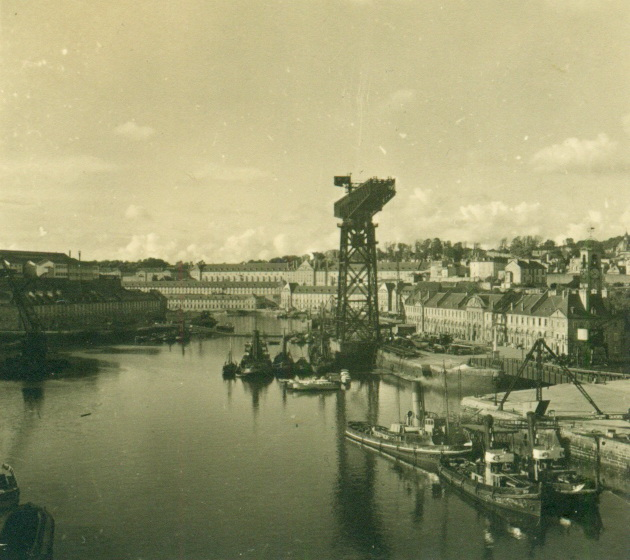
1941: Brest Arsenal on the bank of the Penfeld. In the background, to the right, "la grande grue électrique de l’arsenal à Brest" the big electric crane.

- 1940 – Construction of the Submarine Base during the German occupation - the military port became an important German strategic base.
- 1963–1964 – Jetty enlarged.
- 1969–1970 – Construction of aircraft-carrier locks 3 and 4.

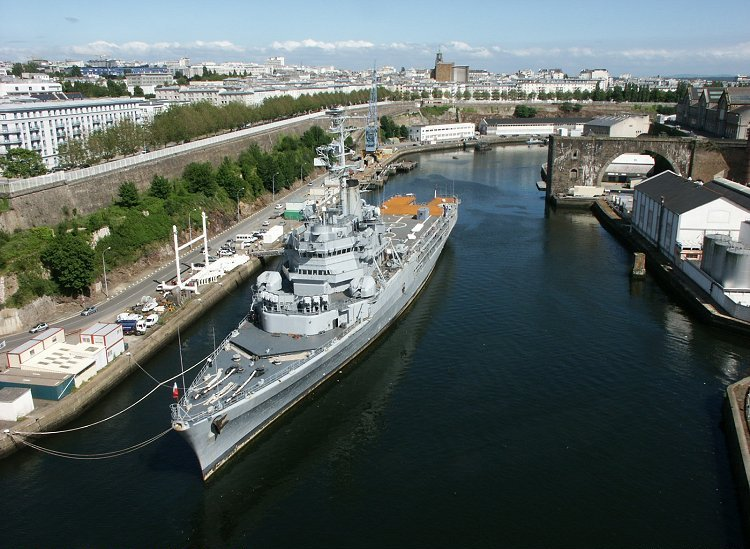
The helicopter-carrier Jeanne d'Arc docked on the left bank of the Penfeld, downstream of the pont de l'Harteloire. The high-tides are too low for ships to be able to dock nearer to the quays, which are still all along the river. In the background, the église Saint-Louis, to the right, the viaduct of the "grue revolver," a former crane that looked like a pistol.

== Penfeld quays ==
The Penfeld, within the military enclosure, is almost wholly lined with quays, but ships cannot come directly alongside these quays because of heads of rock that are left exposed at low tide. That's why floating stages are moored fore and aft, mainly on the left bank, to make up postes where some “small” ships can come alongside and use some installations such as the large crane.

Little used upstream of the Pont de Recouvrance, downstream of this bridge these postes nevertheless serve the old sailing ships of the Navy, the tugboats and other support boats of the arsenal, and transrades, passenger ships which provide a service across the roadstead (rade de Brest) between Brest and the Crozon peninsula (Île Longue, École Navale)

== Outfitting quay and Oblique quay ==
These two quays are located between Bassin 9 and the groyne of Laninon. They are serviced by five cranes. The latest major overhaul dates back to the reconstruction of the basins of Laninon, whose lengthening has altered the layout of the oblique quay.

These quays are used for the pre-launch finishing of the new ships built in Brest (Like French ship Mistral and French ship Tonnerre), the mooring of the larger naval assets of the Marine Nationale (Like French cruiser Jeanne d'Arc), and the floating maintenance of all types of Vessels

== See also ==
- Île Longue
- Pont de Recouvrance
- Recouvrance
- Penfeld
- Rue Saint-Malo
