= Rue de Siam =

Thoroughfare in Brest, France

Coordinates: 48.387202°N 4.490125°W

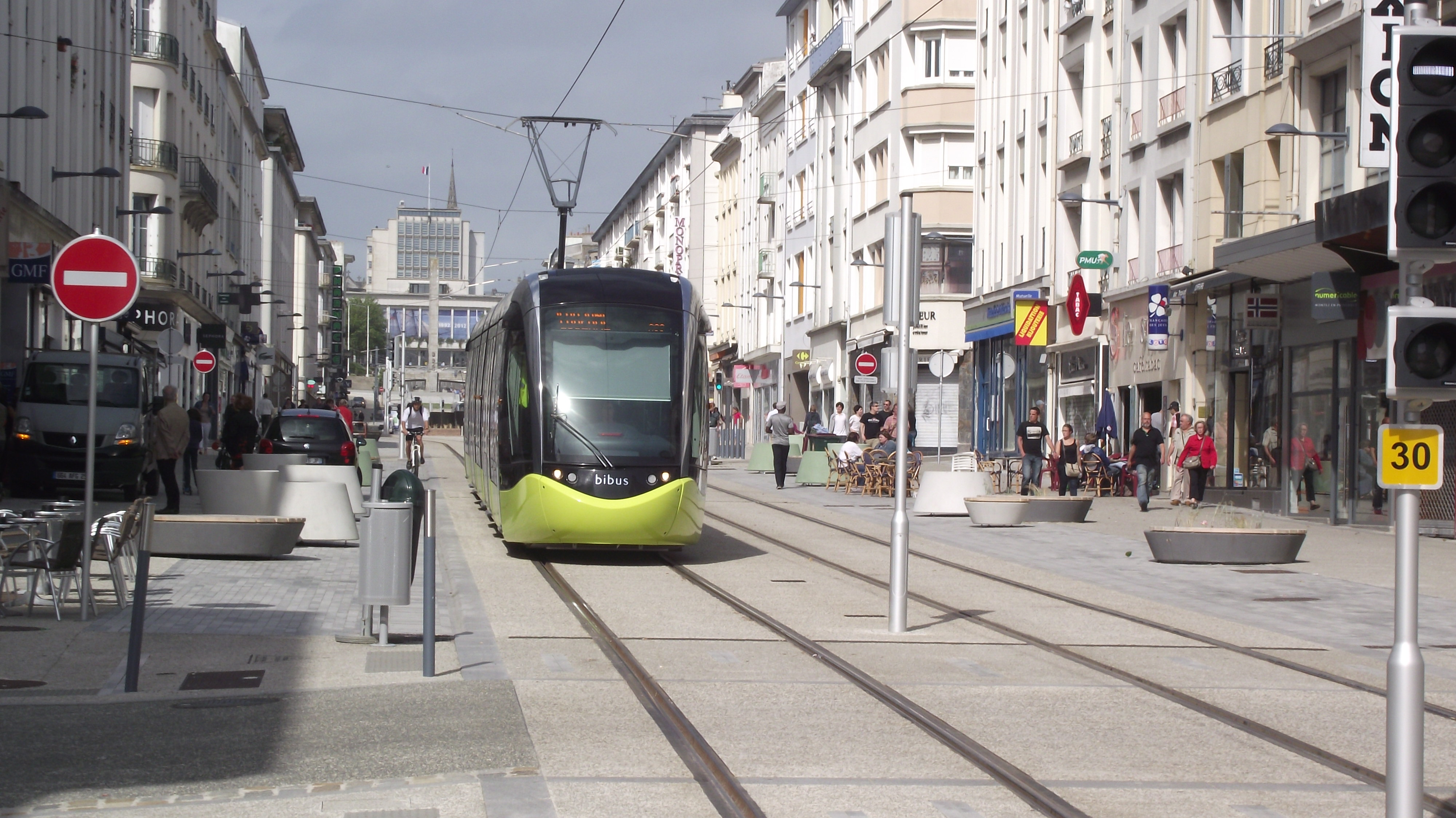
The tram in the Rue de Siam nowadays

The Rue de Siam (Breton: Straed Siam; "Siam Street") is the main arterial street of Brest, France.

== Toponymy ==
The street owes its current name to the arrival of three ambassadors led by Kosa Pan and sent by the King of Siam (present-day Thailand), on 29 June 1686, to meet King Louis XIV in Versailles. They had traveled aboard the ships l'Oiseau and La Maligne and were accompanied by six mandarins, three translators, two secretaries and a retinue of servants, laden with numerous gifts. They crossed the Rue Saint-Pierre to reach the hostel of the same name. The inhabitants were so amazed that they renamed the street.

== History ==
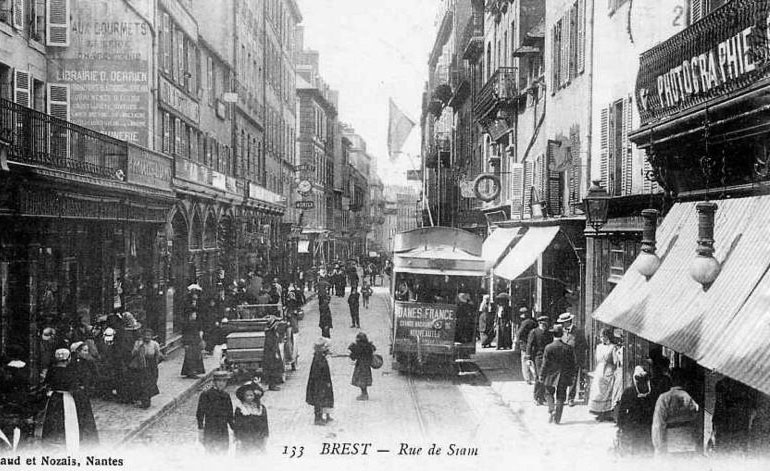
The Rue de Siam before World War II

The street was quite narrow before World War II. The near-total destruction of central Brest during the Battle for Brest in 1944 led to a rapid postwar reconstruction under the direction of architect Jean-Baptiste Mathon, which widened and rebuilt the Rue de Siam in a modernist idiom. The reconstruction of central Brest is frequently cited among the more contested examples of French postwar urbanism.

Soi Charoen Krung 36 Alley, the location of French Embassy in Bangkok, was renamed in 2013 to "Rue de Brest" to commemorate diplomatic relations, reciprocating the Rue de Siam.

== Location ==
From the Place de la Liberté, in the centre of Brest, the Rue de Siam runs southwest to the Pont de Recouvrance, spanning the river Penfeld. Recouvrance is a working-class district of old Brest that contrasts sharply with the Rue de Siam where, in the 1950–60s, the city's chic stores and cafés were located.

There used to be l'Épée café on the right and Les Antilles restaurant on the left. Midshipmen and officers of all nationalities used to have an aperitif at l'Épée and then cross the Rue de Siam to have supper at Les Antilles.

== In popular culture ==
The Rue de Siam features in Jacques Prévert's poem "Barbara", first published in his 1946 collection Paroles; the poem evokes a woman walking on the street in the rain and mourns the "rain of iron, of fire, of steel, of blood" that fell on Brest during Allied bombing in the Second World War.

== Gallery ==
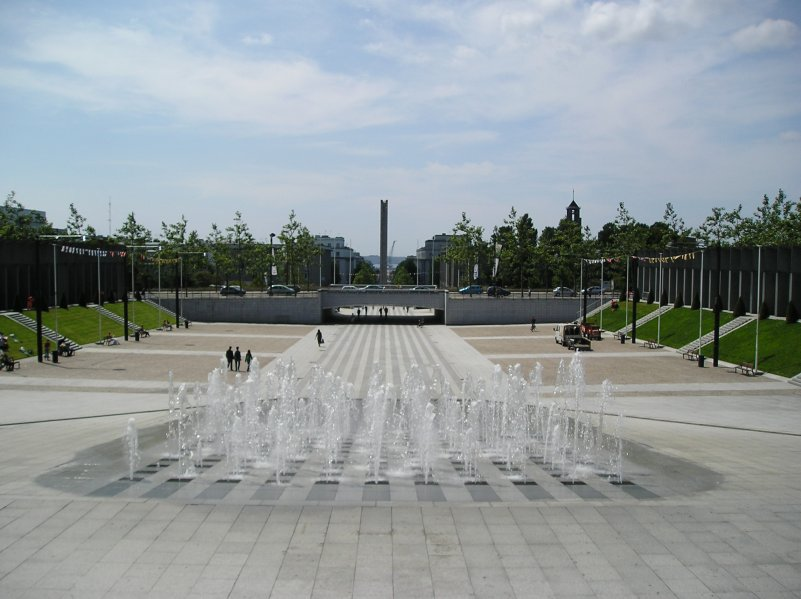
Monumental perspective from the Place de la Liberté opening to the Rue de Siam, with the roadstead of Brest in the background, and on the right, the steeple of Saint-Louis Church dominating the rebuilt centre of Brest.

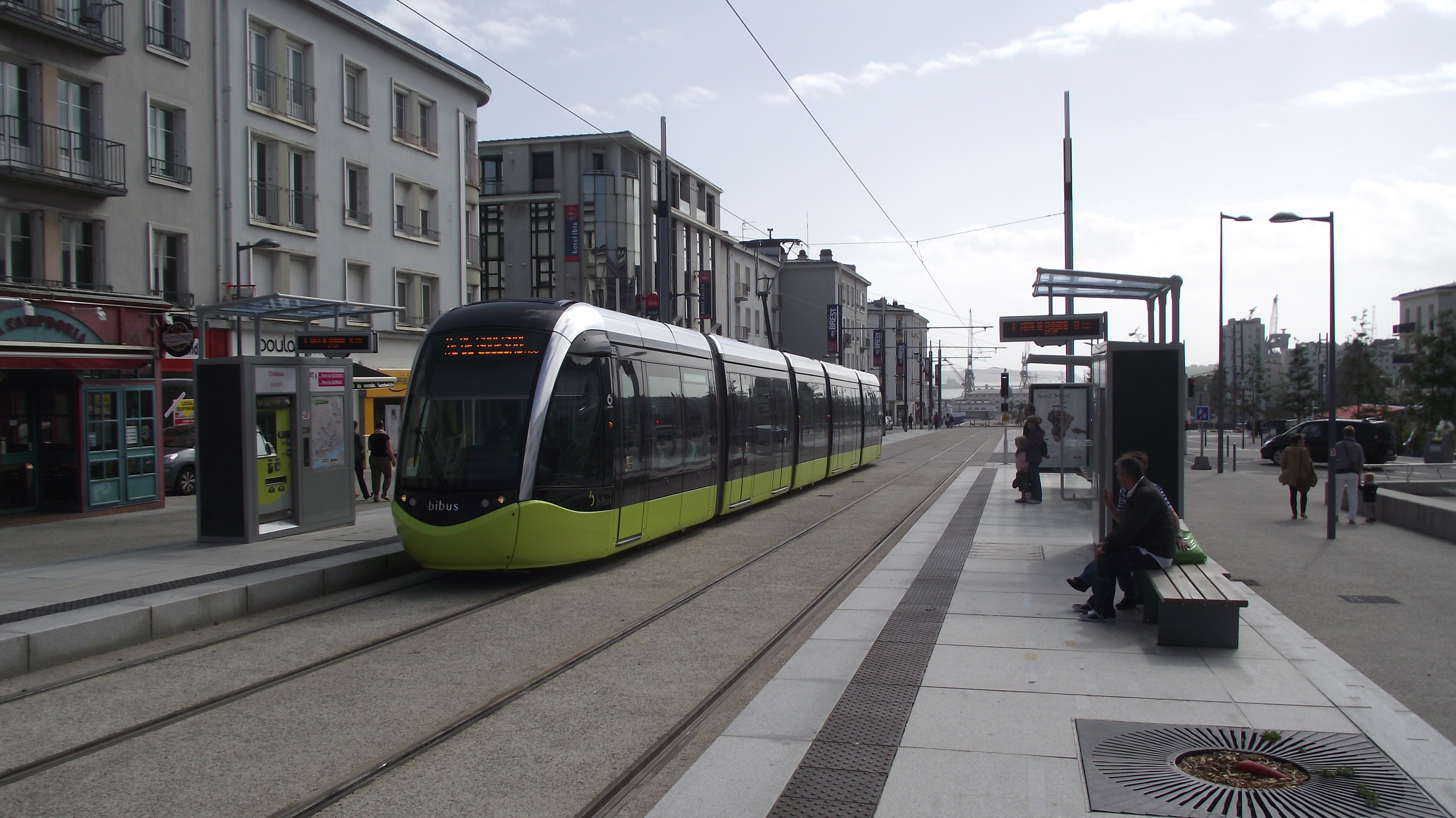
The street nowadays

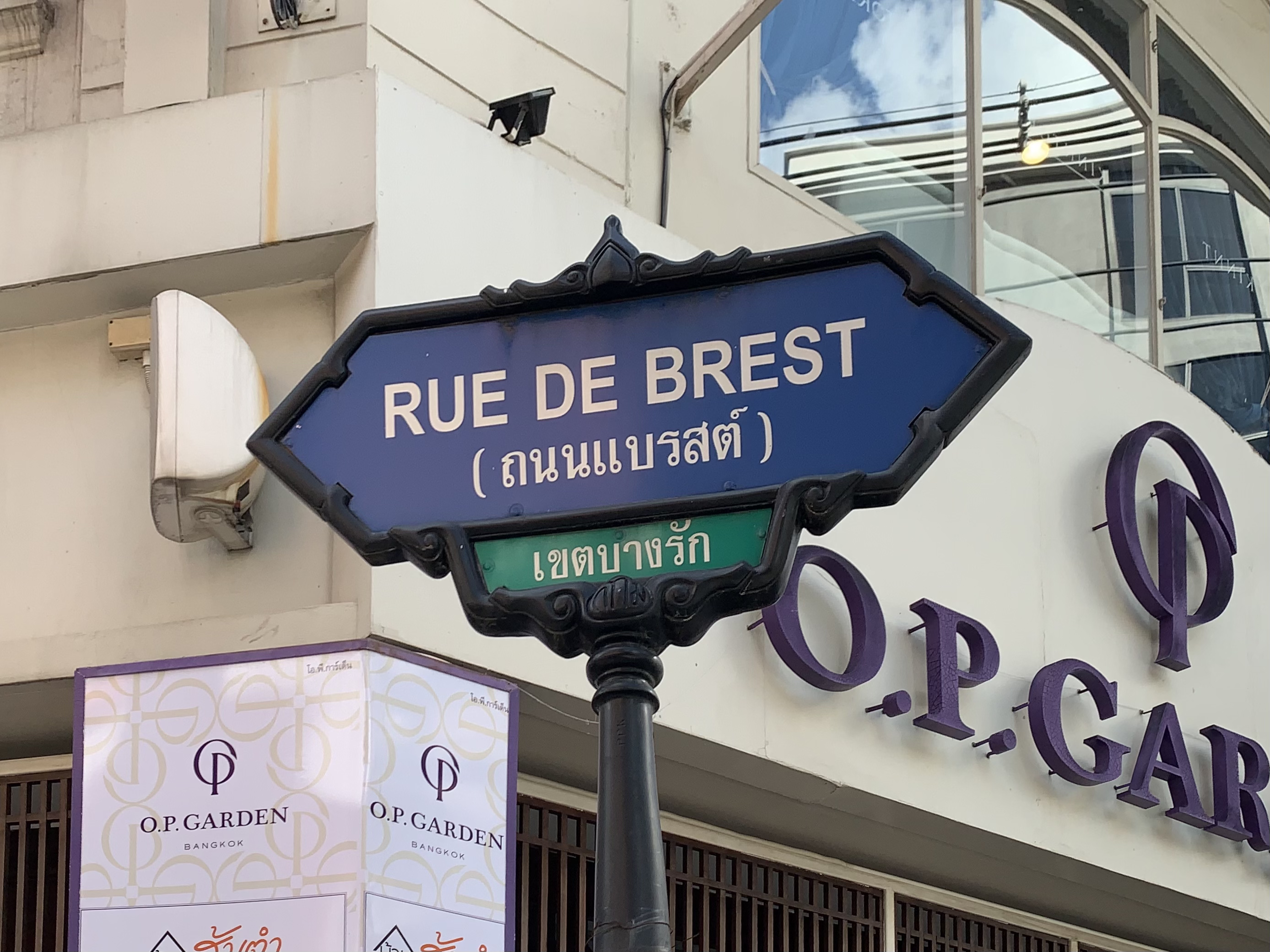
Bangkok's Rue de Brest

== See also ==
- Rue de Brest, Bangkok; the counterpart street named after Brest, France in Bangkok
- France-Thailand relations
