= Brest tramway =

Tramway in Brest, France

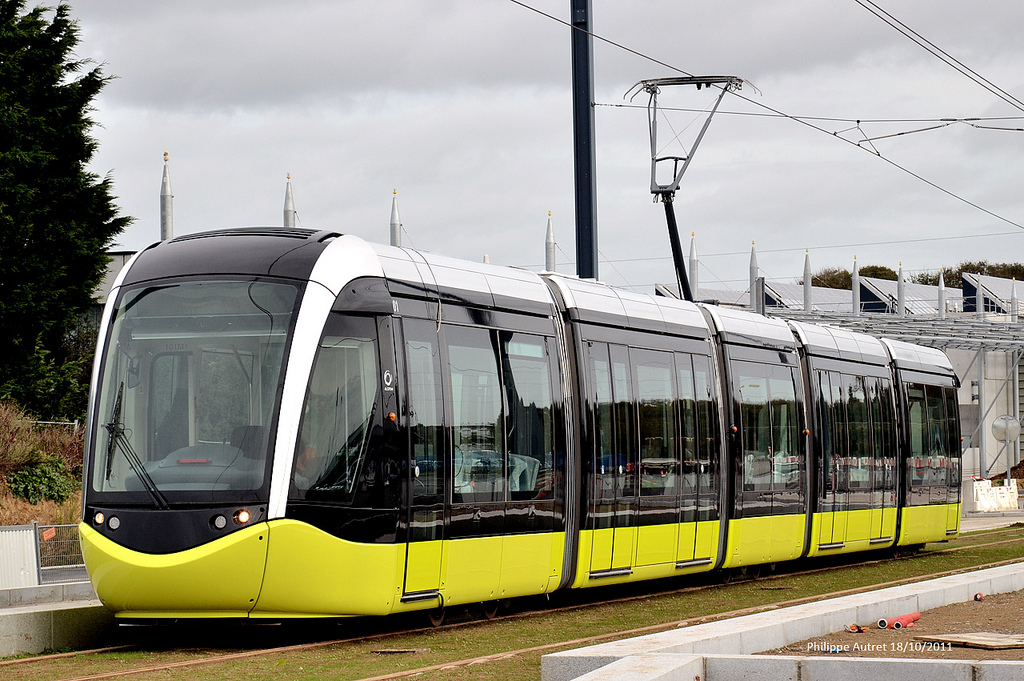

Overview
- Native name: Tramway de Brest
- Locale: Brest, Brittany, France
- Transit type: Tram
- Number of lines: 2
- Number of stations: 39
- Annual ridership: 10.50 million (2018)

Operation
- Began operation: Line A: 23 June 2012; Line B: 14 February 2026.
- Operator: RATP Dev
- Rolling stock: Alstom Citadis
- Number of vehicles: 20 Citadis 302; 8 Citadis 305

Technical
- System length: 19.4 km (12.1 mi)
- Top speed: 70 kilometres (43 mi)
System map
Map of Brest tramway

The Brest tramway (French: Tramway de Brest, Breton: Tramgarr Brest) located in Brest, Brittany, France consists of two light-rail lines. The system is operated by RD Brest, and it's part of the Bibus network. It is the successor to a tram network that operated in Brest from 1898 to 1944. The network has the distinction of being trilingual (French, English and Breton).

Line A, the first line, is 14.3 kilometres (8.9 mi) long and has 28 stops and two branches, connecting Porte de Plouzané in the west with branches to Porte de Gouesnou and Porte de Guipavas northeast of the city centre. The end-to-end journey takes 38 minutes. Line A began service on 23 June 2012, and is expected to serve 50,000 passengers per day.

Line B, the second line, is 5.1 kilometres (3.2 mi) long and has 11 stops, connecting Gares (Brest station) in the city centre with CHU La Cavale (hospital) northwest of the city centre. The end-to-end journey takes 17 minutes. There are three transfer hubs along the line. Line B opened to the public on 14 February 2026.

At Place de la Liberté, riders are able to transfer between lines A and B, as well as to Line D, a bus rapid transit line (French: Bus à haut niveau de service – BHNS). The lower station of Line C, an urban cable car line (French: téléphérique), lies near Line A's Château station.

== History ==
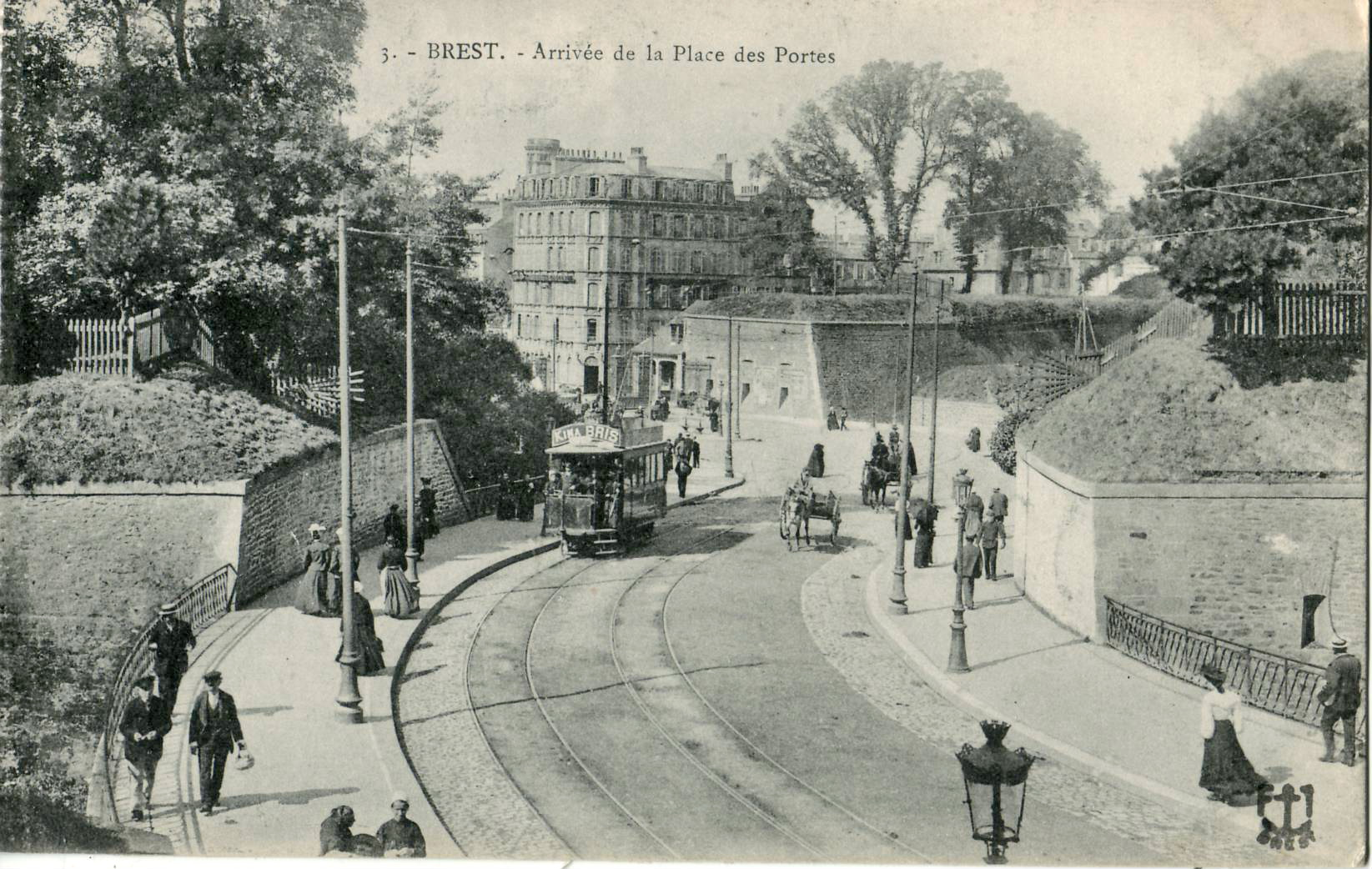
The old tram of Brest, around 1907

=== Old tram of Brest ===
In 1898, the first line of the Brest tram opened. The network was in operation until the city was bombed in 1944. In 1947, it was replaced by trolleybuses, which operated on three lines, with 30 vehicles. From 1963, diesel-powered buses were purchased to modernize the vehicle fleet. From 1965, one-person operation was introduced on the buses, while the trolleybuses still had to be operated by two drivers. For reasons of personnel savings, the trolleybus operation was therefore discontinued on 9 November 1970.

=== Revival plan ===
In 1984, the Urban Community of Brest (CUB), then chaired by Georges Lombard, evokes the return of the tram as part of the development of its urban transport plan. In the following year, a state subsidy completed a finance study for the project. On 19 December 1988, the Community Council of the CUB unanimously votes to create a two-line network. Next year, newly elected mayor of Brest becomes president of the CUB, and Pierre Maille takes over the file. On 1 October 1989, the urban community decided to continue with the technical and financial studies leading to a project of two lines with a total length of 13.5 km (8.4 mi). However, in 1990, over 80% of the population have voted against the project in a referendum, which buried the project until the following decade.

In the municipal elections of 2001, François Cuillandre, who succeeded Pierre Maille as mayor of Brest, becomes the president of the CUB and launches studies concerning a new tramway project. His new project intended to complement the North-South TCSP on a commercial axis of 8 km (5.0 mi) long, plus 2 km (1.2 mi) of service roads. By the end of 2002, the project was subsidized at 30%, the first consultations and preliminary studies were launched, and back then the start of work was set to be in 2010. Next year, the start of work was set to start in 2009. In November 2003, when the preliminary consultation was about to end, the mayor of Brest announced that the line would link the Technopôle Brest-Iroise to the Kergaradec business park, serving the streets of Siam and Jean-Jaurès. It was also announced the transport payment, then set at 1.05%, one of the lowest in France, will be gradually reassessed in order to finance the line; it reached the rate of 1.65% in 2007.

In 2006, a new step was taken with the creation of SemTram, the mixed economy company which will be responsible for the project management of the line. The SemTram is a group of companies made up of the SEM companies of the TCSP (SEM of public transport on its own site of the urban community of Brest ) and Egis Rail. The SEM of the TCSP is a local mixed economy company with a capital of €150 thousand, created in April 2006 on deliberation of 16 December 2005, which aims to ensure the project management of the work of the first tram line in Brest. It brings together seven partners who are: Brest Métropole Océane (53%), Caisse des dépôts et consignations (15%), Departmental Council of Finistère(10%), Brest CCI Brest (7%), Crédit Agricole du Finistère (5%), Caisse interfédérale de Crédit mutuel (5%), and Caisse d’épargne de Bretagne (5%).

In February 2007, the community council of Brest Métropole Océane voted to build the Froutven branch at the same time as the rest of the line, bringing its total length to nearly 14.5 km (9.0 mi), for an amount estimated in July 2006 at 298 million euros. Completed in May 2007, the consultation presenting the project to the public made it possible to add two additional stations, one in the city center and one in Kergaradec, for a total of 27 stations.

=== Construction ===
For Line A, construction work on the platform began in early 2010, followed in June by laying the foundation stone for the maintenance center. The site of the maintenance center is marked by shell demining operations from World War II when the city had been bombed for nearly four years. The demining operations that took place from August 2009 to March 2010 were necessary to remove 16.5 tons of explosives and demolish 11 blockhouses. The first rail was laid and welded by the end of August 2010. Overall, the work in 2010 was devoted to the construction of the platform and the laying of the tracks, while the work in 2011 was devoted to the installation of equipment and the electrical supply, signaling and the development of stations.

In February 2010, a controversy broke out over the choice of the supplier of the granite slabs that decorate the public spaces within the tram network, Eurovia, the Chinese company that won the tender for supplying the granite, was chosen because it was more competitive in price, which was seen by some as ignoring the local granite providers and affecting the sustainable development plans. In May, the metropolis announced that local companies would win part of the contracts, in particular the paving of the Place de Strasbourg.

On the night of 22 to 23 August 2011, a major stage of the work was completed with the installation of the new deck of the Recouvrance bridge, the old deck dating from 1954 with limited tonnage (3.5 tonnes) was replaced for a new structure, making it possible to support the 40 tonnes of a tram train, and equipped with cantilevers for pedestrians on either side. At the end of November 2011, it was announced that the tram would have 28 stations, with the entry into service in 2012 of the Kerlaurent station, whose name was initially attributed to the Eau Blanche station, originally defined as a "reserve" station of the branch of Guipavas, but whose construction of 300 homes nearby motivated the metropolis to build it immediately.

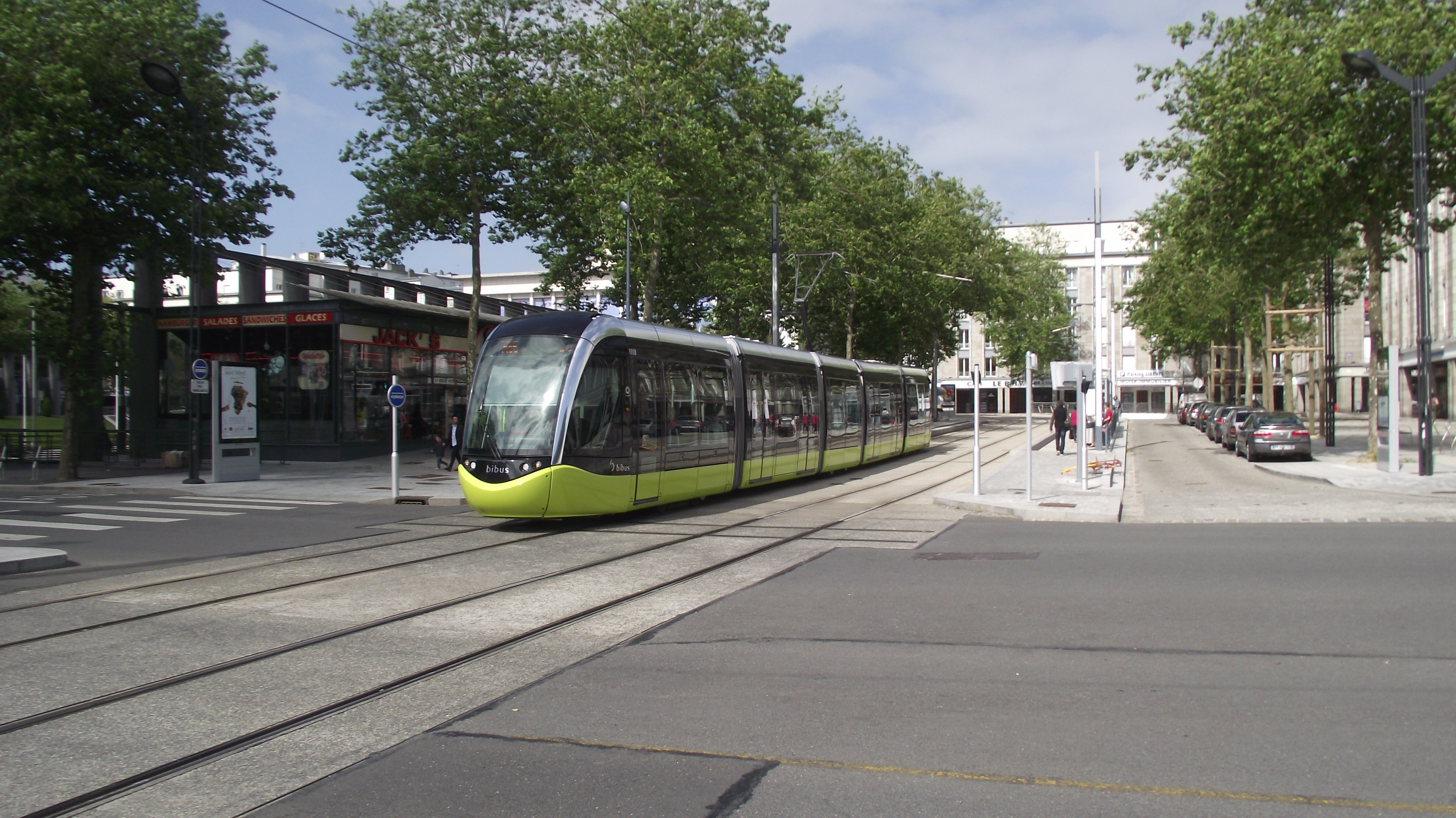
At Place de la Liberté, the crossing with Line B was installed during the construction of Line A.

The final phase for testing operation on Line A took place from 5 June to 22 June 2012.

In February 2010, the local authorities announced they had started preparing studies for the construction of a second line, Line B. Mayor François Cuillandre also said: "We are convinced that the second line will be requested once the first is operational." During the construction of Line A in 2011, various preliminary work was carried out to enable the construction of the second line without serious disruption to operations on the first line.

Line B was created under the project name Mon Réseau Grandit. Construction for Line B began in April 2023, starting with the relocation of underground utilities. Construction of the roadbed for the tramway began in early 2024. In late 2024, work started on terminal stations. Work for both Line B and Line D (BRT) occurred simultaneously.

=== Inauguration ===
Line A was inaugurated at 11 am, on 23 June 2012, at the end of the Rue de Siam, in front of the Recouvrance bridge, in the presence of the mayor François Cuillandre and the president of the Brittany region Jean-Yves Le Drian, marking the start of two days of festivities including a giant parade and a flashmob on the evening of 23 June. The Bibus network was offered for free during the inaugural weekend as well as for the first day of operation.

On 4 October 2012, the British Light Rail Transit Association and Tramways & Urban Transit magazine named the Brest tramway the second-best "international tram project of the year", tied with the Casablanca and Zaragoza tramways, at the organisation's annual Light Rail Awards.

Line B opened to the public on 14 February 2026 with the official opening being on the previous day.

== Rolling stock ==
Line A is operated with 20 Alstom Citadis 302 trams, which were jointly purchased with the Dijon tramway to reduce cost. The tram sets are numbered from 1001 to 1020. The first train was delivered on 7 September 2011, from the Alstom factory in Aytré, on the outskirts of La Rochelle. The other train sets were delivered and put into service from November at a rate of around two to three trainsets per month until June 2012. The five-section, double-ended trams are 32.7 metres (107 ft) long and 2.40 metres (7 ft 10 in) wide and have a capacity for 200 passengers with 42 seated.

Alstom shipped eight Citadis 305 trams starting August 2025 for Line B's opening in February 2026. This was part of a joint order including Brest, Toulouse (9 trams) and Besançon (8 trams). These have differences from the trams used on Line A. The new trams have larger windows and 12 more seated positions for riders. The nose of the tram has been modified to reduce the severity of injuries in the event of a collision with a pedestrian. The Citadis 305 trams are 3.5 percent lighter and use 25 percent less electricity. These trams will be 32.5 metres (107 ft) long and 2.40 metres (7 ft 10 in) wide. Each side of the tram will have 4 double doors 1.30 metres (4 ft 3 in) wide plus 2 single doors. They will have a capacity of 201 passengers with seating for 54. There will be zones reserved for wheelchairs and strollers.

The Operations and Maintenance Centre (French: Centre d’exploitation et de maintenance technique – CEMT), is located at 1 Avenue 1ère DFL, near Line A's Porte de Plouzané station. Serving both lines, the depot provides storage, maintenance, repairs, and interior and exterior cleaning for trams.

== Cost ==
The cost of the project to build Line A was estimated at €290 million euros in July 2006, distributed as follows:

- Engineering services and project management: €60 million
- Construction of the maintenance center: €15 million
- Purchase of rolling stock: €55 million
- Construction of engineering structures: €10 million
- Construction of track and equipment infrastructure: €158 million

In 2010, the cost increased to €338 million, and eventually to €383 million in 2012.

In 2025, the estimated cost for Line B was €225 million, jointly funded by Brest Métropole, the French government, the Bretagne région, the city of Brest, the European Union and the Agence de l’Eau Loire Océan.

== Trilingualism ==
The network has the distinction among French trams of being trilingual; French, English and Breton. This trilingualism is found in audio announcements, card headers, station names, timetables, ticket distributors and various technical information on board trains.

The organizations affiliated with the promotion of the Breton culture such as the Aï'ta and Sked argued that the Brest metropolis has not kept its commitments, particularly with regard to audio announcements, whose versions in Breton are rarely broadcast or only at the terminuses, or even tickets where the choice of Breton was still not active one year after commissioning, and that it even disappeared from certain equipment in 2013.

== Line descriptions ==
=== Line A description ===
Line A

Overview
- Native name: Ligne A
- Status: active
- Locale: Brest, France
- Termini: Porte de Plouzané; Porte de Gouesnou Porte de Guipavas
- Stations: 28

Service
- Type: Tram
- Operator: RD Brest
- Depot: 1
- Daily ridership: 35,000 (2025)

History
- Opened: 23 June 2012

Technical
- Line length: 14.3 km (8.9 mi)
- Track gauge: 1,435 mm (4 ft 8 1/2 in) standard gauge

Google Street View is the source of the following description.

From the terminal station Porte de Plouzané, the line follows 1 Avenue 1ère DFL running past the junction for the Operations and Maintenance Centre (tram depot) and the street's namesake stop before continuing onto Boulevard de Plymouth (stops: Fort Montbarey and Coat Tan), Rue du 19 Mars 1962 (stop: Polygone), Rue Dupuy de Lôme (stop: Dupuy de Lôme) and Rue Saint-Exupéry (stops: Les Capucins, Saint-Exupéry and Mac Orlan). The tramway on these streets operates in a reservation, either in the centre or on the side of the street, with tracks mostly embedded in grass. From Rue Saint-Exupéry, the line turns onto a centre reservation in the middle of Rue de la Porte (stop: Recouvrance).

The line crosses the Penfeld river on the Pont de Recouvrance, which has two lanes shared by both trams and road vehicles. After crossing the river, the line continues onto Rue Pierre Brossolette and then Rue de Siam. It passes the Château stop, which is a short walk to the nearby Line C arial cable car station. Trams run along Rue de Siam (stop: Siam), a shopping street without road traffic. At Place de la Liberté, Line A crosses Line B. After the Liberté stop, Line A passes a track switch at Rue Comtesse Carbonnières to allow Line B trams to access the tram depot via Line A.

From Place de la Liberté, the line continues on Rue Jean Jaurès, another shopping street. Until Rue Saint-Martin, there is no road traffic along Rue Jean Jaures (stops: Jean Jaures and Saint-Martin). Between Rue Saint-Martin and Rue du Vercors, Rue Jean Jaurès has three lanes, a one-way lane for road traffic with tram tracks taking the other two lanes (stop: Octroi).

At Place de Strasbourg (stop: Strasbourg), the line changes to Rue de Gouesnou (with stop: Menez Paul) sharing the three-lane street with a one-way lane for road traffic. After Rue Professeur Chrétien, the tracks are in a grass-embedded centre-of-street right-of way. At Rue du Dourjacq, the line turns onto Rue du 8 Mai 1945 running on the side of the street on grass-embedded track. It turns onto Rue Cézanne (stops: Europe and Pontanézen) and then Boulevard de l'Europe. (Line B travels on a different portion of Boulevard de l'Europe without connecting to Line A.) At Rue de Gouesnou, the line splits into two branches. One branch turns along Rue de Gouesnou (stops: Mesmerrien and Kergaradec) and then onto Route de l'Échangeurin on a grass-embedded centre-of-street right-of way to terminate at Porte de Gouesnou. The other branch continues further along Boulevard de l'Europe (stops: Eau Blanche and Kerlaurent) until Rue Lamartine where it continues on the side of Highway D205 to terminate at Porte de Guipavas.

=== Line B description ===
Line B

Overview
- Native name: Ligne B
- Status: active
- Locale: Brest, France
- Termini: CHU La Cavale; Gares
- Stations: 11

Service
- Type: Tram
- Operator: RD Brest
- Depot: uses Line A depot
- Daily ridership: 25,000 (projected)

History
- Opened: 14 February 2026

Technical
- Line length: 5.1 km (3.2 mi)
- Track gauge: 1,435 mm (4 ft 8 1/2 in) standard gauge

From the public transport hub Gares at Brest Station, Line B takes Avenue Georges Clemenceau, crosses Line A at Place de la Liberté (stop: Liberté – Quartz), turns onto Rue Duquesne then Avenue Foch between the Victor Ségalen Faculty and Morvan Hospital (stop: CHU Morvan).

The line continues along Avenue Foch to Place Albert 1er (stop: Albert 1er) before crossing a new tram-only bridge located parallel to the Robert Schuman Bridge used by pedestrians and road traffic. The bridges pass over a wide ravine. Continuing along Avenue le Gorgeu, the line passes buildings of the Université de Bretagne-Occidentale. From Avenue le Gorgeu, the line passes through the Bellevue district via Rue de Kergoat (stop: Kergoat) and Rue du Duc d'Aumale. The line turns along Rue Maréchal Vallée crossing a ravine called Vallon de Normandie on a new bridge to join Avenue de Tarente.

From Avenue de Tarente, the line follows Avenue de Provence, Rue de Fougères near Brest Business School, and Boulevard de l'Europe. The line then crosses the Pont de la Villeneuve on a single, bidirectional track. The line reaches Boulevard Tanguy Prigent before continuing to the last station, CHU La Cavale, below the nearby Cavale Blanche hospital.

The trip time over Line B is 17 minutes.

== Network Map ==
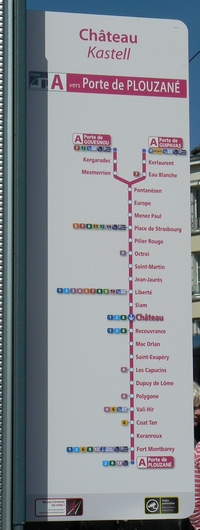

== Around the tram ==
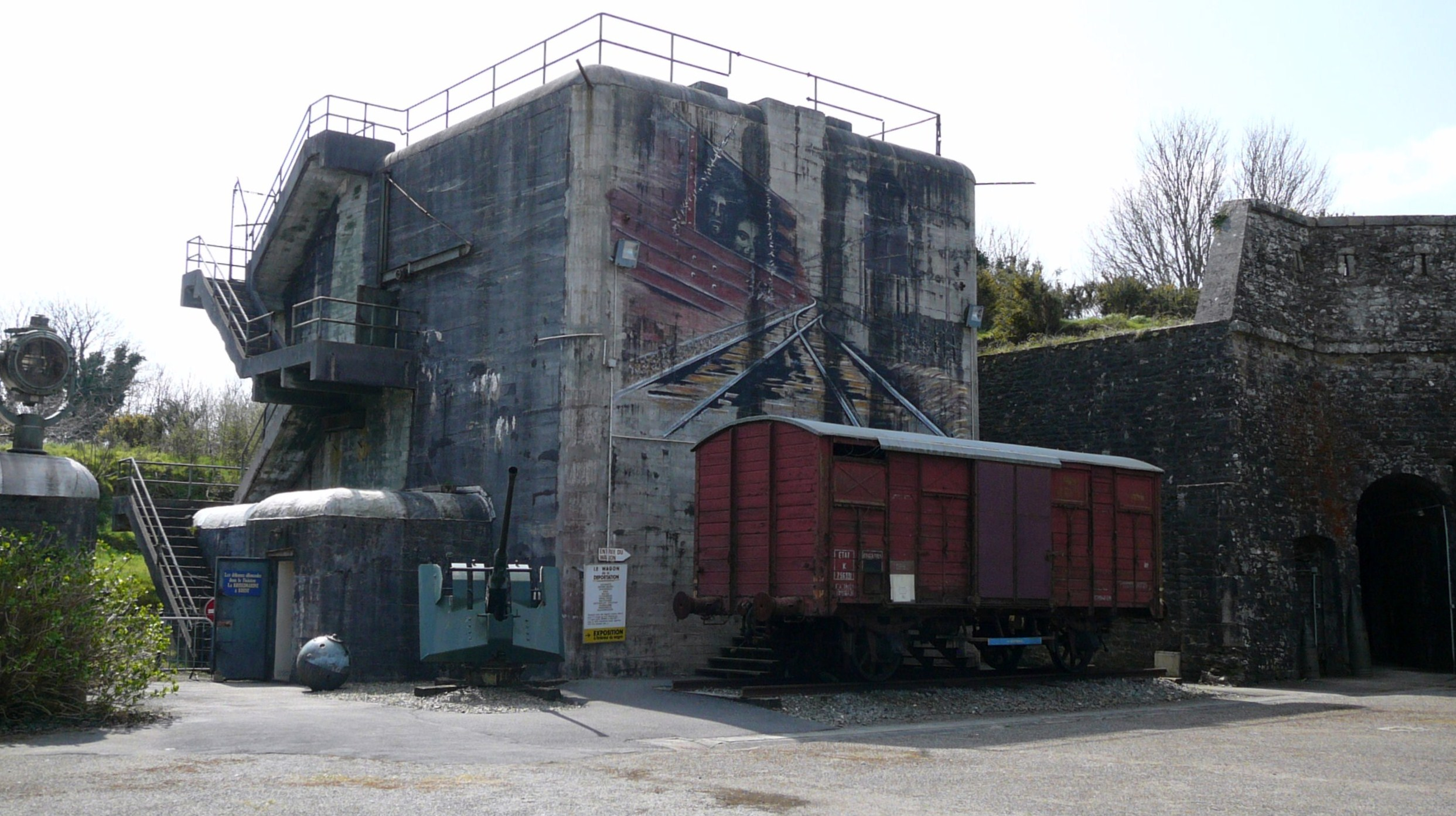
Fort Montbarey

=== Tourism ===
Line A serves, from west to east, the following places of attraction and monuments:

- Fort Montbarey
- Iroise-Carrefour shopping center
- Brest Arena
- Dupuy-de-Lôme high school
- Église Sainte-Thérèse-du-Landais
- Workshops of the Capucins plateau and the Brest cable car
- Recouvrance district, with many remarkable buildings including the Tanguy tower
- Recouvrance bridge
- The castle, home to the National Maritime Museum
- the Le Quartz performance hall
- the Place de la Liberté and the town hall
- Augustin-Morvan hospital
- Saint-Louis Church
- Saint-Martin district
- ENSTA Bretagne

=== Artistic approach ===
On 29 June 2009, Brest métropole decided to allocate a budget of one million euros for the realization of works of art at the network, while there was already three existing installations.

The seven works produced as part of the construction of the tram are:

- "Les Tickets collection" by Mrzyk & Moriceau (decorated tickets)
- "The Empathic Tree" by Enric Ruiz Geli, at the Château station.
- "Les Jetées" by Didier Faustino, at Strasbourg station
- "Signs of Life" by Olivia Rosenthal and Philippe Bretelle, between the Europe and Pontanézen stations
- "The Recouvrance Generator" by Pierre di Sciullo, between the Recouvrance and Les Capucins stations
- Hughes Germain's "Vibrating Cylinders", at Dupuy de Lôme station.
- "Data Horizon" by Sylvie Ungauer, at Porte de Plouzané station.

These three installations existed before building the new network:

- "The lakes" by Marta Pan, at the Siam station.
- "Recouvrance" by Marcel Van Thienen at the Fort Montbarey station (formerly located at the bottom of the rue de La Porte when exiting the Pont de Recouvrance).
- "Palaver tree and bulwark" by Bénédicte Klène at the Europe station.

== See also ==
- Trams in France
- List of town tramway systems in France
