= Pont de l'Harteloire =

Coordinates: 48°23′33″N 04°30′02″W

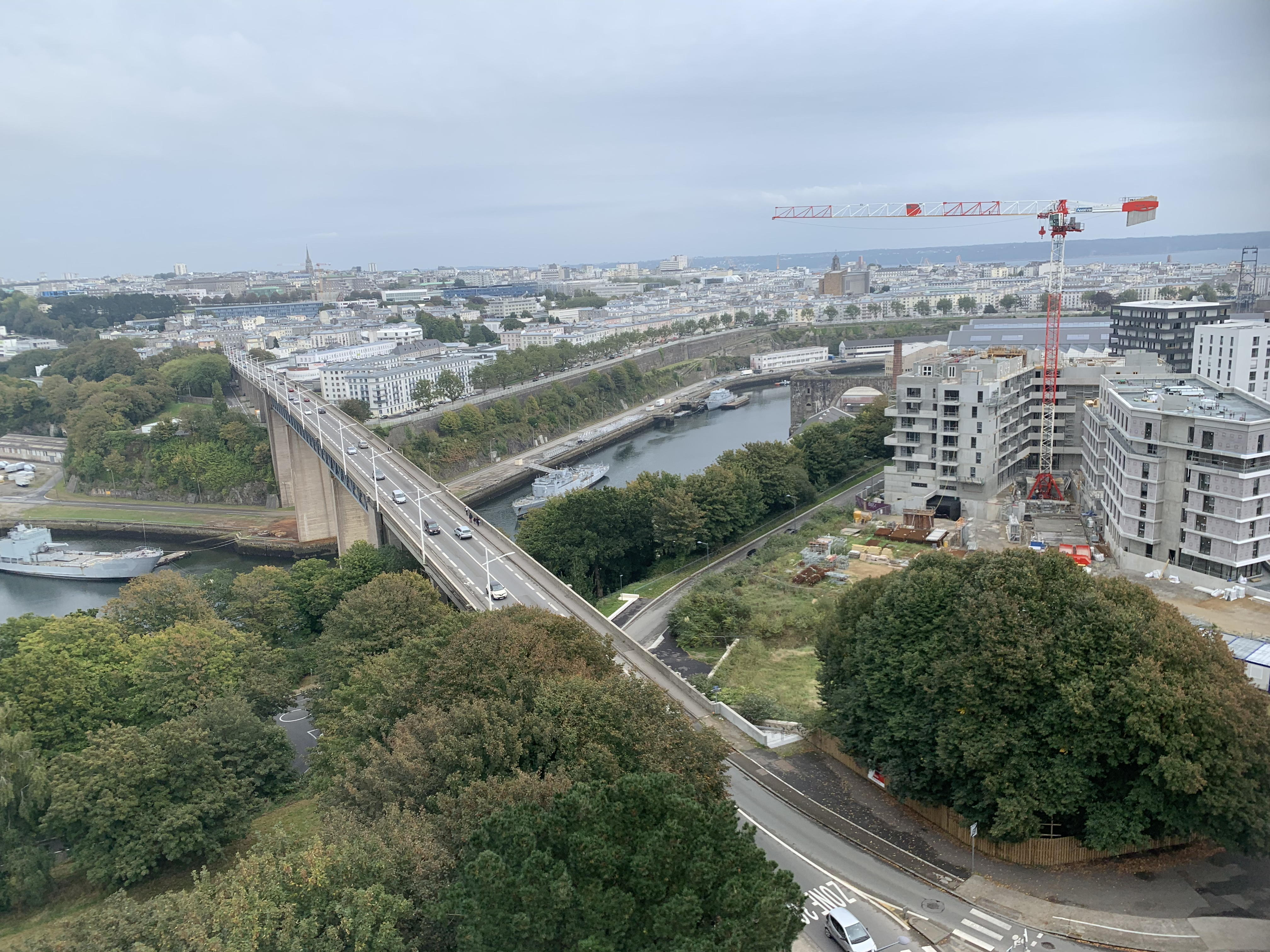
The bridge from above, facing south

The Pont de l’Harteloire (French pronunciation: [pɔ̃ də laʁtəlwaʁ]) is a bridge in Brest, France. Upstream of the Pont de Recouvrance, it connects the two banks of the river Penfeld and overlooks the arsenal de Brest. It is on the site the naval transporter bridge was destroyed during the Second World War.

== Construction ==
Construction began in 1948 following the demolition of the Brest Transporter Bridge and was finished in 1951. Construction was done by Campenon-Bernard, Entreprises Limousin, and Seibert.

The bridge has a deck truss design, which is supported by four concrete pillars. The main span is 97 meters, and the total length of the bridge is 581 meters. It supports 2 lanes of traffic and sidewalks on both sides.
