= Brest Prison =

Former prison in France

Coordinates: 48°23′33″N 4°29′42″W

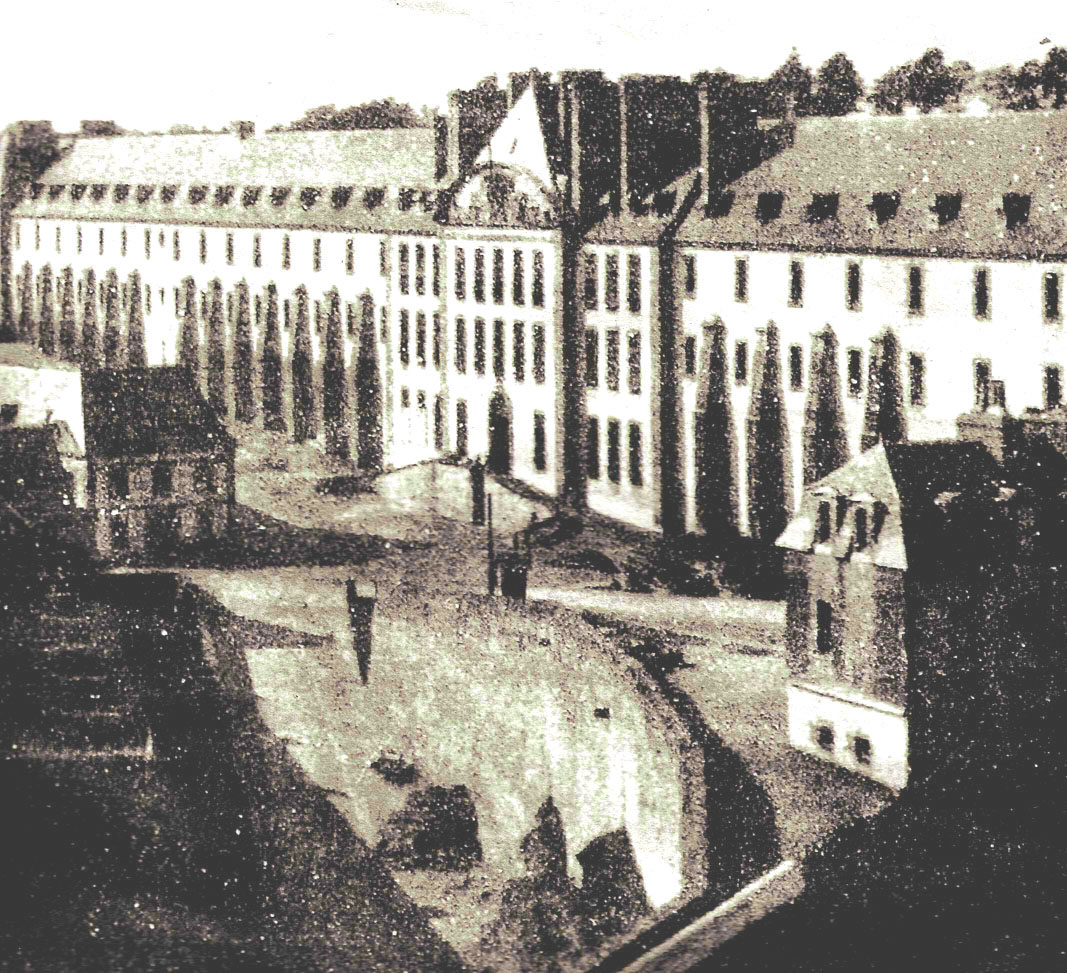
The Brest Prison in the late 19th or early 20th century.

The Brest Prison (French - bagne de Brest) was a 254m long prison in Brest, France. It was built between 1749 and 1751 by Antoine Choquet de Lindu, dominating the military port it was built to serve. It could house 3000 prisoners (sometimes as much as 10% of the town's population), children as young as 11 as well as older people. It was closed in 1858, and demolished in the late 1940s.

== History ==
Its construction was launched after Louis XV, by an ordinance of 27 September 1748, transferred the (previously independent) galleys to the control of the French Navy, to allow him to provide crews for galleys cheaply. Galley prisoners were previously held on their galleys - now they would be housed in new prisons, such as that at Brest. On two levels divided into 4 large sections, the building could house 400-500 prisoners and was designed to house the police cheaply, prevent prisoners escaping and providing for prisoners' vital needs.

Its siting was controversial. Though many citizens of Brest wanted it to be built within the Arsenal enclosure, no site "below the cliff" provided enough room for such a construction or suitable for its sanitary needs (running water, ventilation, and so on). Finally built at Lannouron, on the left bank of the Penfeld, between the high corderie, barracks and hospital.

Closed in 1858 since its living conditions were adjudged to be too soft after reports from workers there and after baron Portal's report, its prisoners were moved to penitentiary colonies.

== Famous prisoners ==
Eugène-François Vidocq, son of an Arras baker, escaped from here as well as from the prison in Toulon and later became chief of police.

== Bibliography ==
- (in French) JARNOUX, Philippe, Survivre au bagne de Brest, Brest, Éd. "Le Télégramme", 2003, 117 p.
- (in French) JOANNIC-SETA, Frédérique, Le bagne de Brest, 1749-1800. Naissance d'une institution carcérale au siècle des lumières, Rennes, Presses universitaires de Rennes, 2000, 360 p.
