= Penfeld =

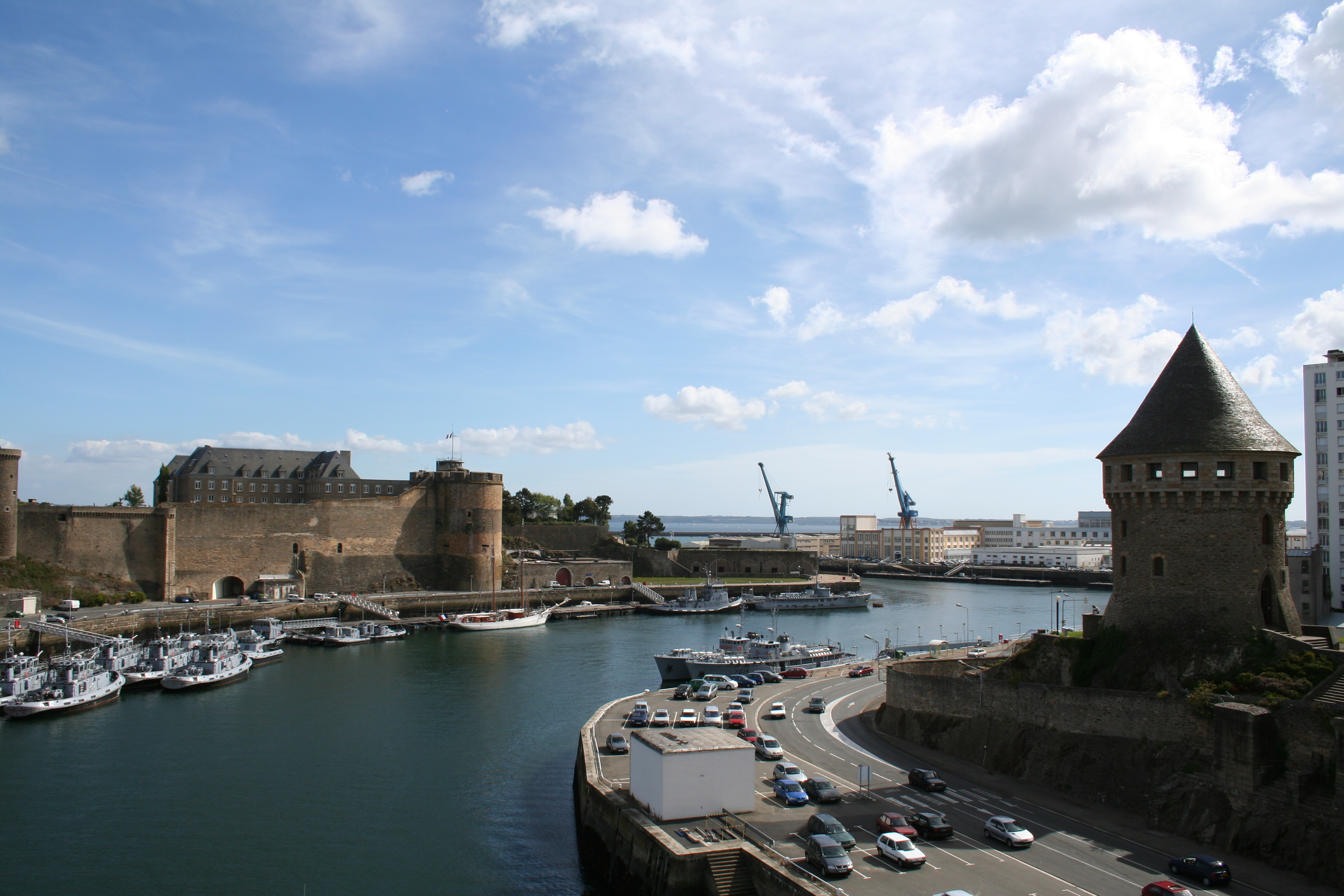
- Penfeld River and the arsenal of Brest

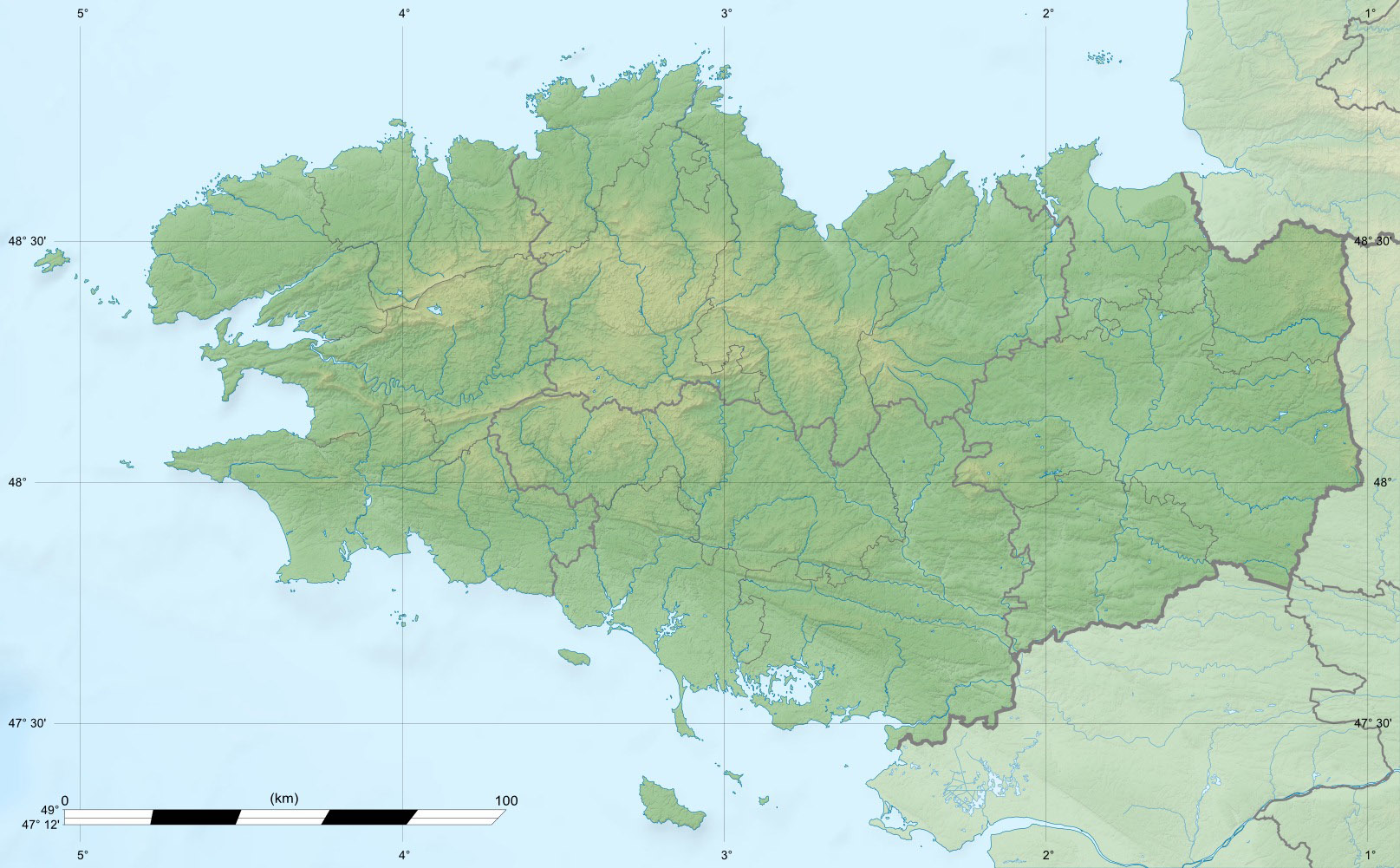

Location
- Country: France

Physical characteristics
- Source
  - location: Brittany
- Mouth: Atlantic Ocean
  - location: Brest
  - coordinates: 48°22′40″N 4°29′38″W
- Length: 16 km (9.9 mi)

The Penfeld (French pronunciation: [pɛ̃fɛl]; Breton: Penfell) is a 16 km (9.9 mi) French coastal river. The town of Brest, in Finistère, has grown up on its left (east) bank.

== Course ==
Its source is in the town of Gouesnou. It then passes through Bohars and Guilers (a village bears the river's name) before it flows out into the roadstead of Brest. The Penfeld runs along the former course of the river Aulne, shifted to the west by the opening of the goulet of the roadstead of Brest by the interglacial periods of the Quaternary Era. That explains its depth, which allows deep-draught ships to go quite a way upstream, with tides running up it up to 8 m (26 ft) deep.

At Brest, the Penfeld is crossed by the Pont de l’Harteloire then, some way downstream, by the Pont de Recouvrance, the largest vertical-lift bridge in Europe until it was dethroned by the Pont Gustave-Flaubert in 2007.

In its last stretch, within embankments 25–30 m (82–98 ft) high, the Penfeld runs through the Brest naval base, and at its mouth (a site whose strategic importance has been recognised since antiquity) is the 15th-century Château de Brest.

== See also ==
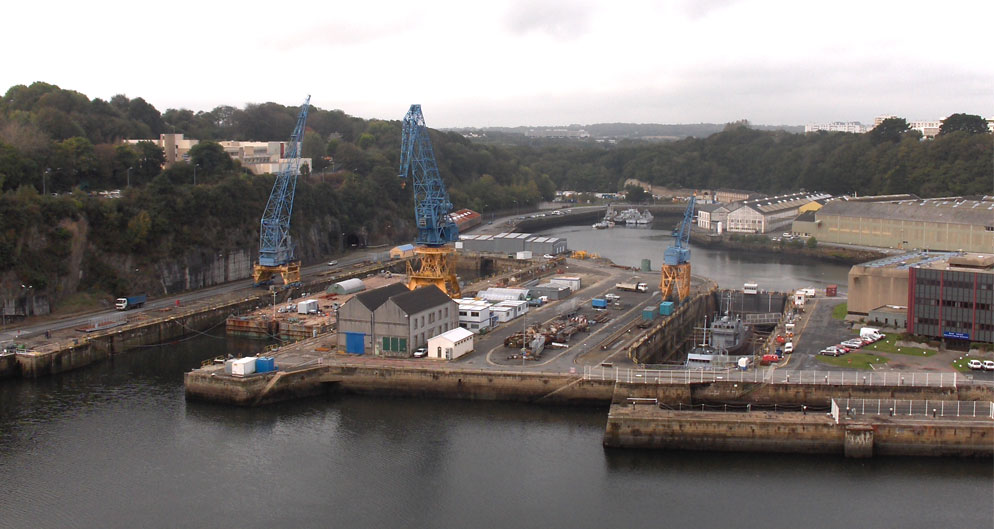
The Penfeld, upstream of the Pont de l'Harteloire

- Pont de l'Harteloire
- Pont National — Pont de Recouvrance
- Recouvrance
- Arsenal de Brest
