= Gegen Engeland (Brest newspaper) =

- Founded: 1940
- Ceased publication: 1944
- Language: German language
- Headquarters: Brest

Gegen Engeland was a German language daily newspaper published from Brest, France between 1940 and 1944. It was published by the German Navy, and was circulated amongst German troops in Brittany and Normandy. Initially it had a 44x30 cm format; later it switched to a 59x42 cm format. The newspaper was printed at the printing house of the local newspaper Dépêche de Brest.

The newspaper title is taken from a German patriotic song Wir fahren gegen Engeland ("We sail to take on England") or simply Das Engelandlied ("The England Song"), written in 1914 by Hermann Löns (a poet who served in the German Army and was killed in World War I) and then set to music. The song was popular in the Imperial German Navy and later in the Kriegsmarine and among the German people, where it is still humorously quoted.
