= Maritime, Fluvial and Harbour Museum of Rouen =

Museum in Rouen, France

Coordinates: 49.445°N 1.061°E

- Musée maritime fluvial et portuaire de Rouen
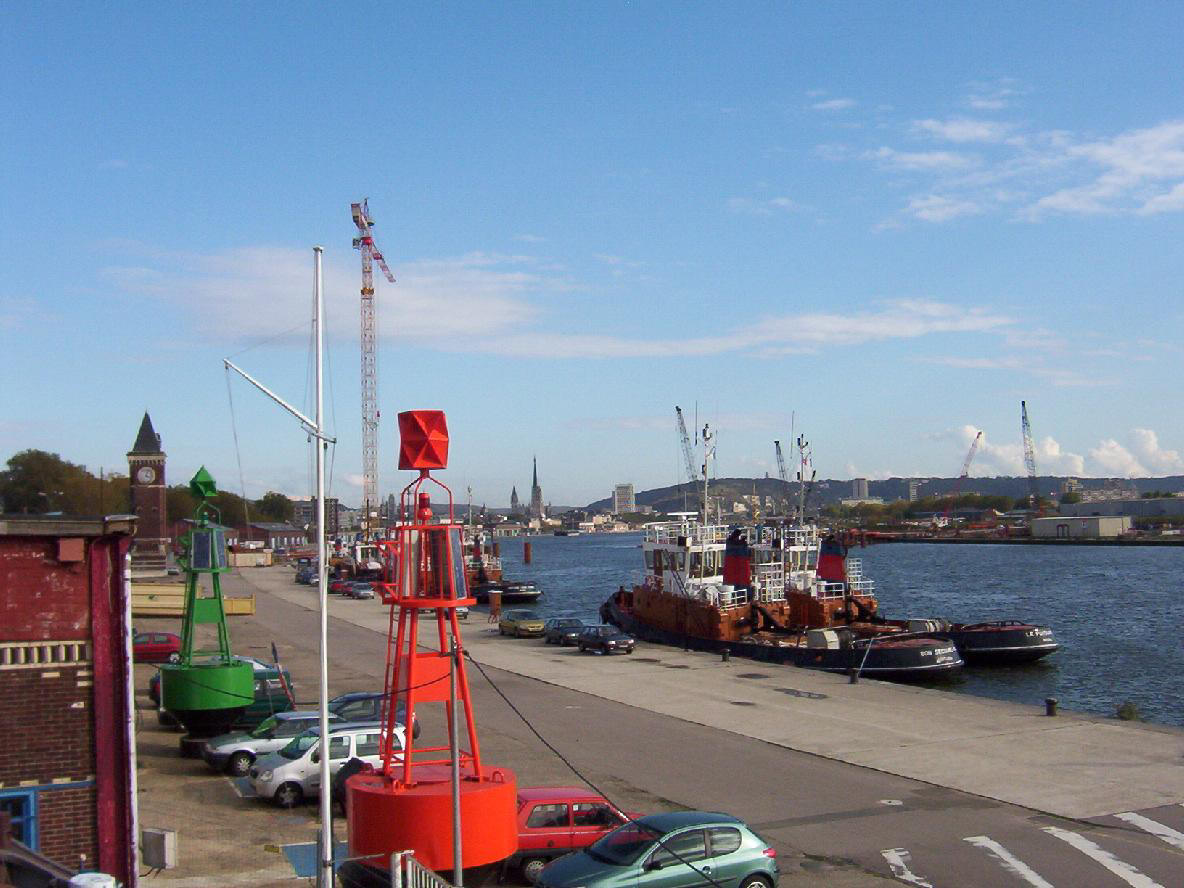
- Established: 1999
- Location: Hangar portuaire n°13, Quai Émile Duchemin, 76000 Rouen, France
- Visitors: about 10,000 per year
- Public transit access: Nearest bus stop: Mont-Riboudet (T1, T2, T3, 16)
- Website: www.musee-maritime-rouen.asso.fr

The Maritime, Fluvial and Harbour Museum of Rouen (French: musée maritime fluvial et portuaire de Rouen) is a museum dedicated to the history of the port of Rouen, which is one of the greatest ports of France. The museum opened in 1999, during the Rouen Armada, a festival of tall ships which takes place every five years.

== The museum ==
The main themes are:

- History of the port, with photos, and an exhibition space about the destruction caused by World War II
- Infrastructure of the port and the measures needed to render the Seine navigable
- Heritage of Rouen in the Age of Sail, with an exhibit on the ships which transported nickel from New Caledonia
- The merchant navy, with numerous models of cargo ships, including some which formerly docked at or near Building 13, which now houses the museum
- River navigation
- Shipbuilding
- Whale hunting, with a whale skeleton (see below)
- The history of submarines, with a reproduction of the interior of Robert Fulton's Nautilus

Visitors can see trawler and barge motors, a fog warning bell which was formerly located in the estuary of the Risle, surface-supplied diving gear and a reproduction of the radio cabin of a 1960s ship.

The skeleton of a whale (on loan from the Natural History Museum of Rouen) is exhibited in the centre of the museum. It is a fin whale which was 7 years old when it died after grounding on a beach.

A 38-metre barge, the Pompon Rouge, is exhibited in the courtyard of the museum. Its hold has been transformed into an exhibition room about river navigation, including a model of a lock.

In addition, there are regular temporary exhibitions on a variety of topics, such as the Rouen transporter bridge or the vikings.

== Pictures ==
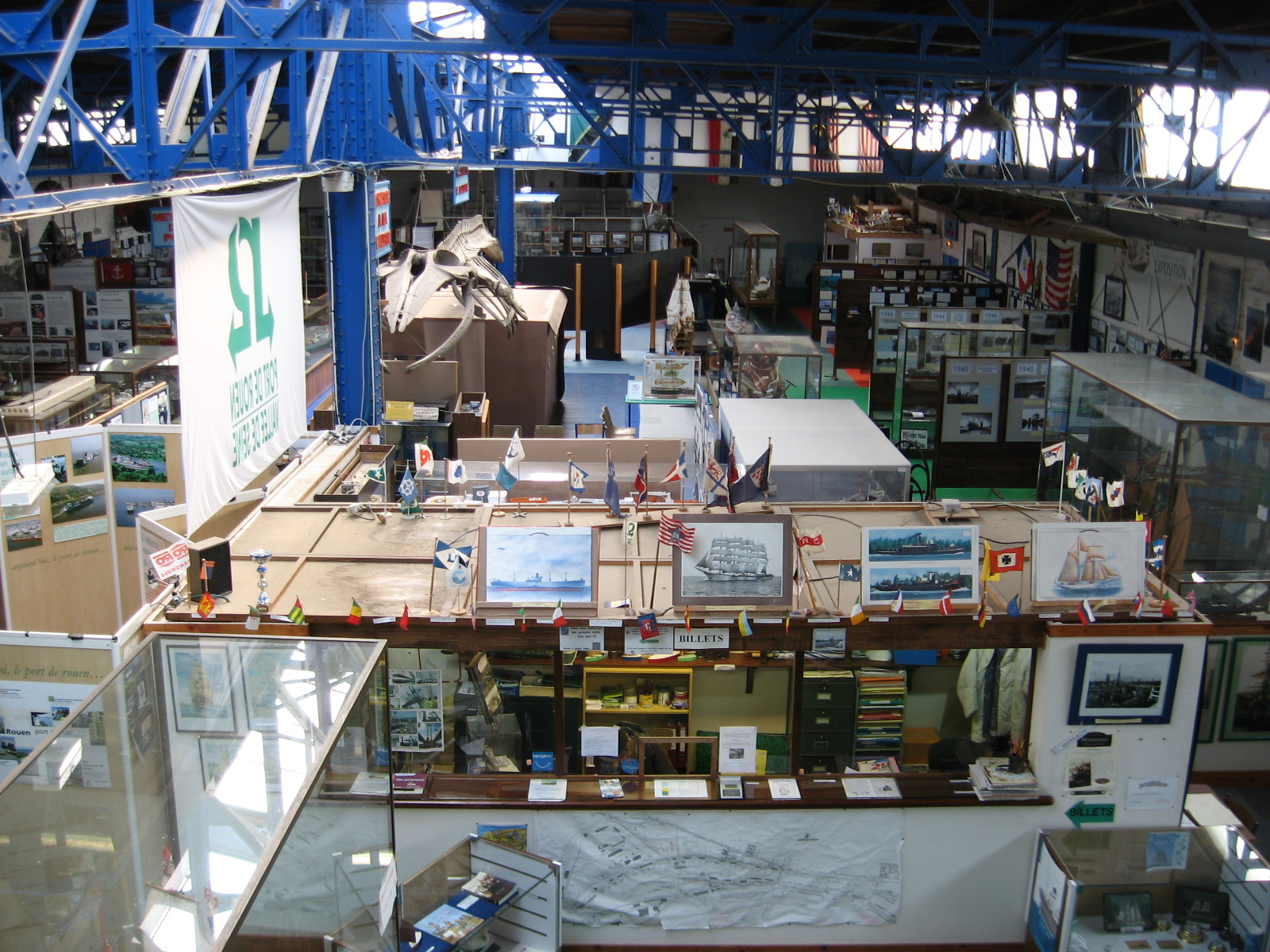
General view of the museum

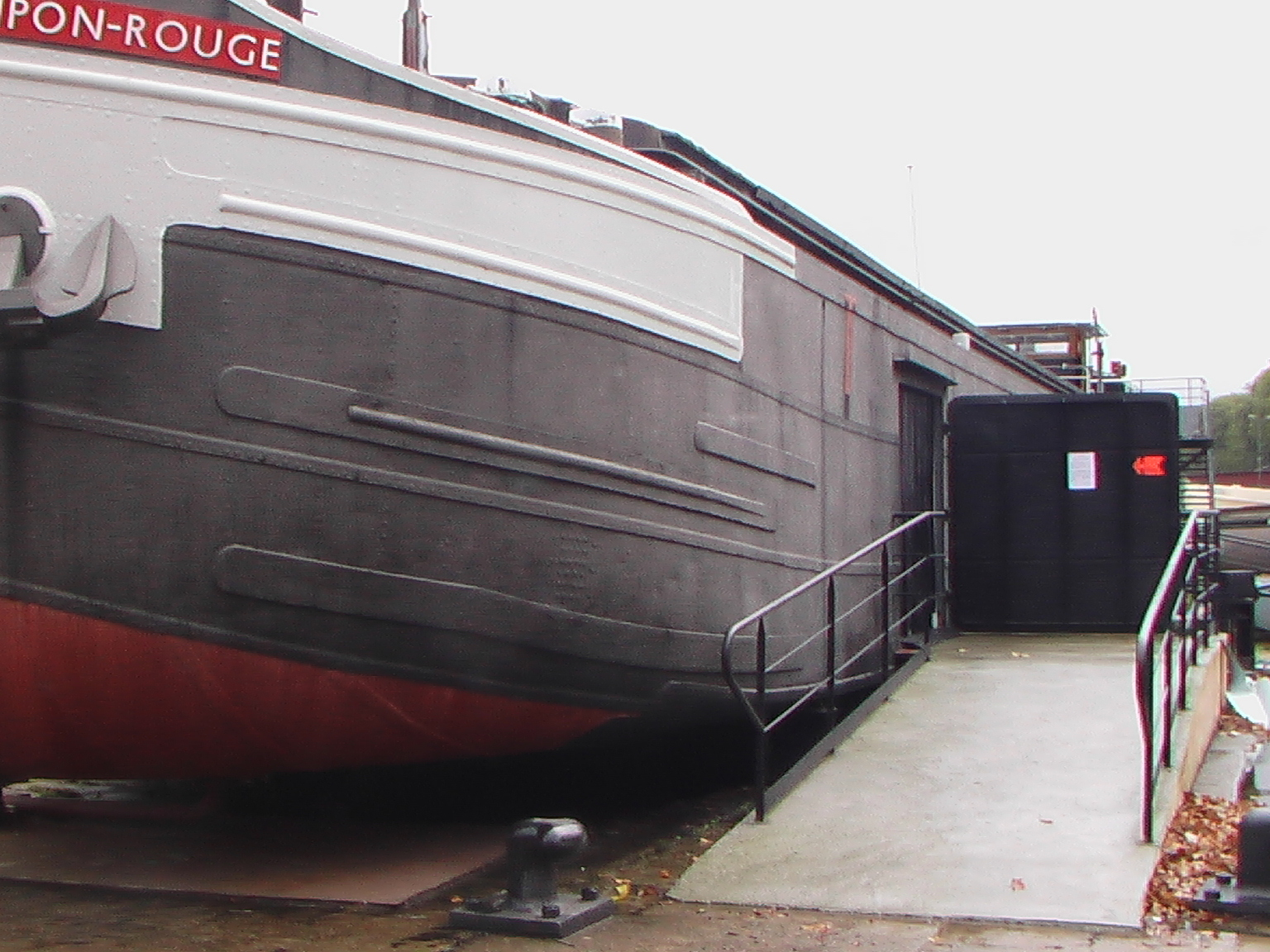
The barge Pompon Rouge, now an exhibition space

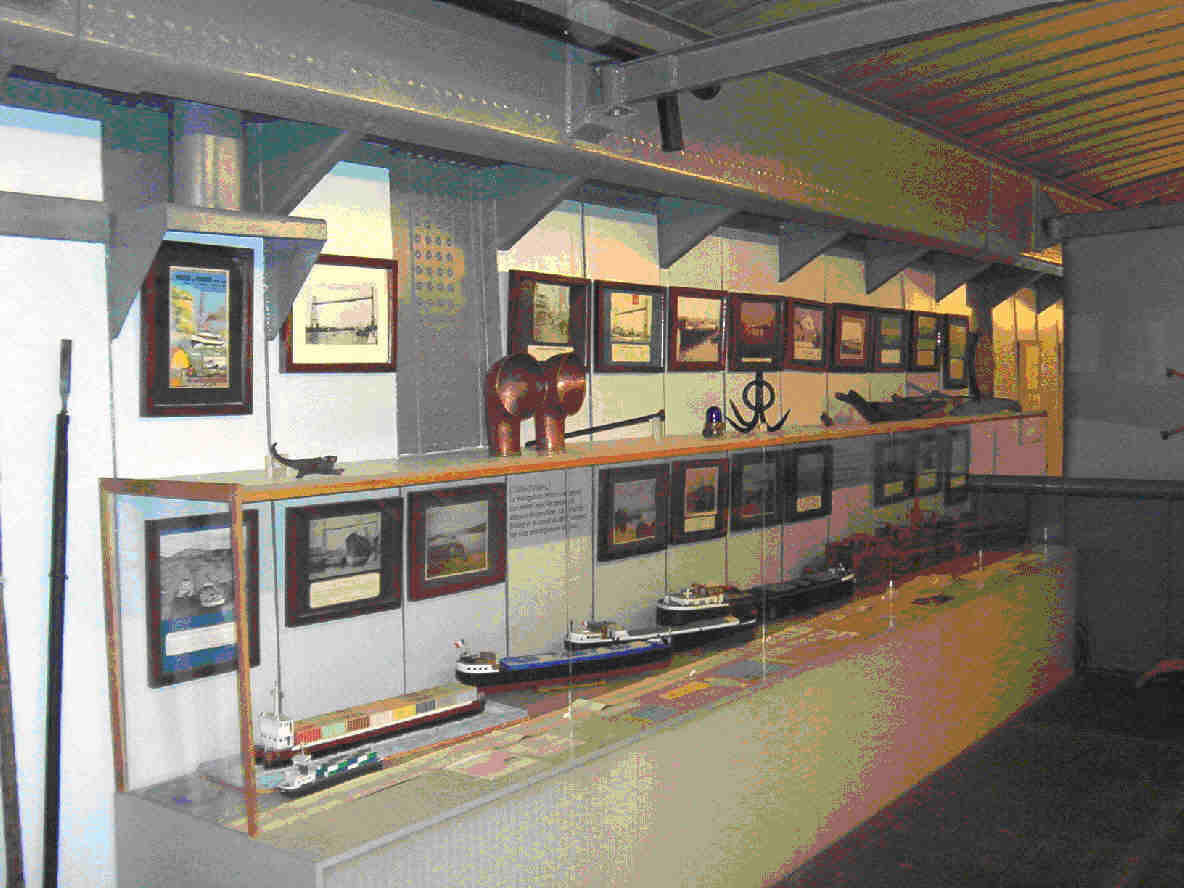
The hold of the barge, with the permanent exhibition on river navigation

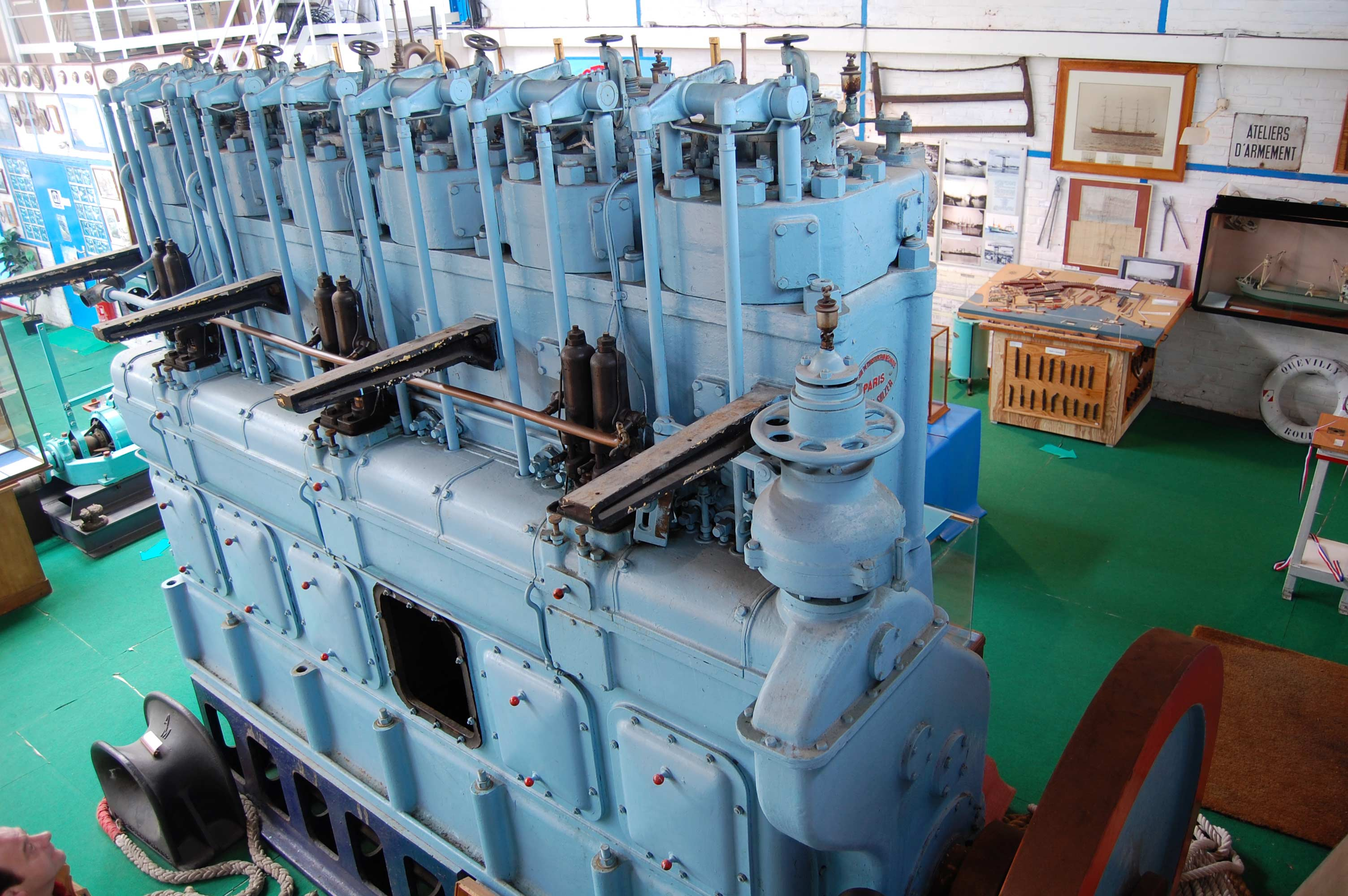
28–tonne, 400 hp Sulzer motor (1937) which powered a trawler

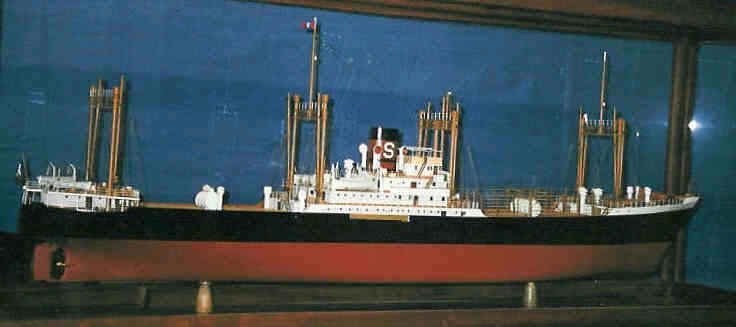
Model of the Marie-Louise Schiaffino, a ship which often docked in front of Building 13

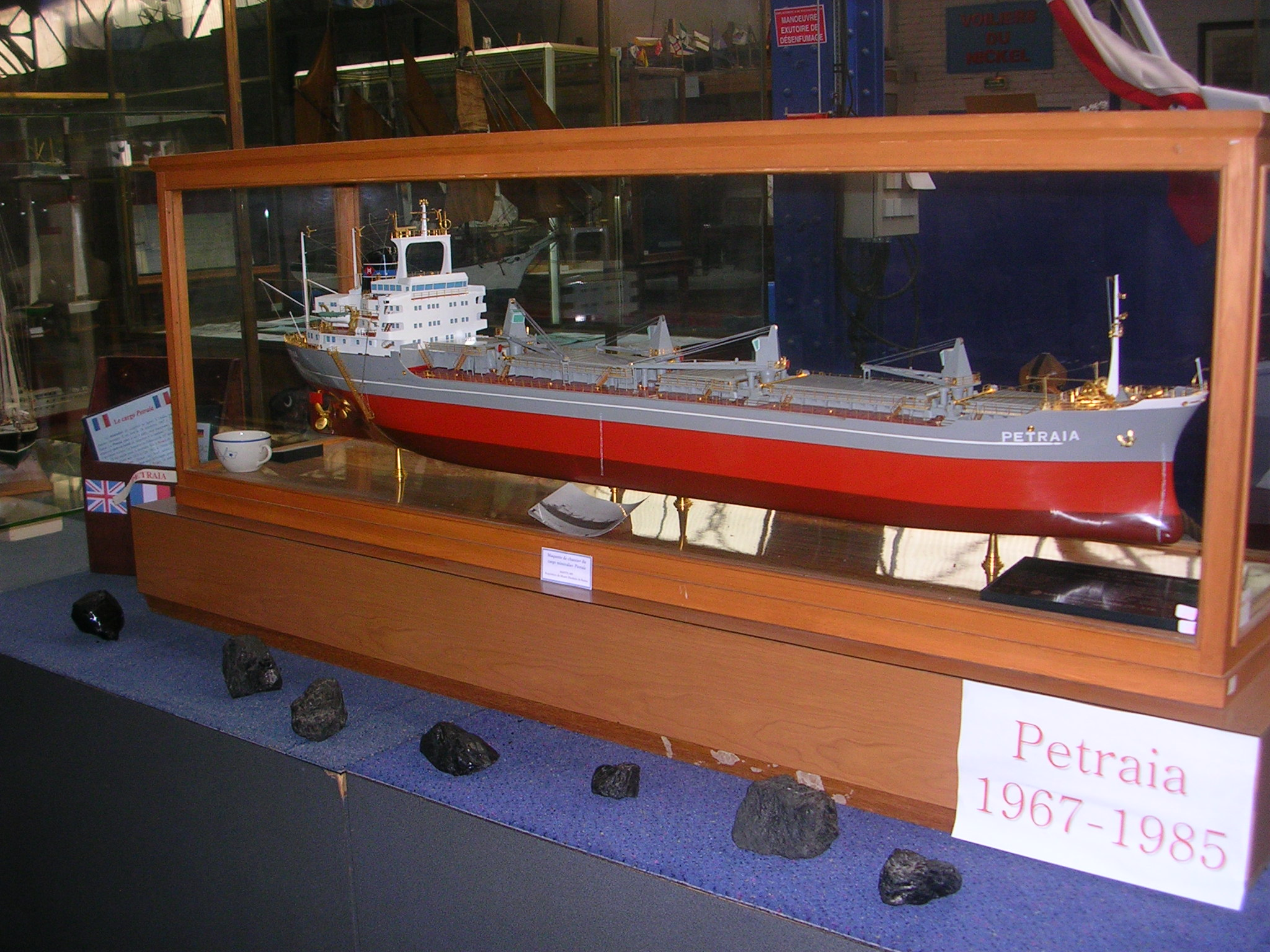
Model of the Petraia, a ship which docked often at the coal dock, across the Seine from Building 13

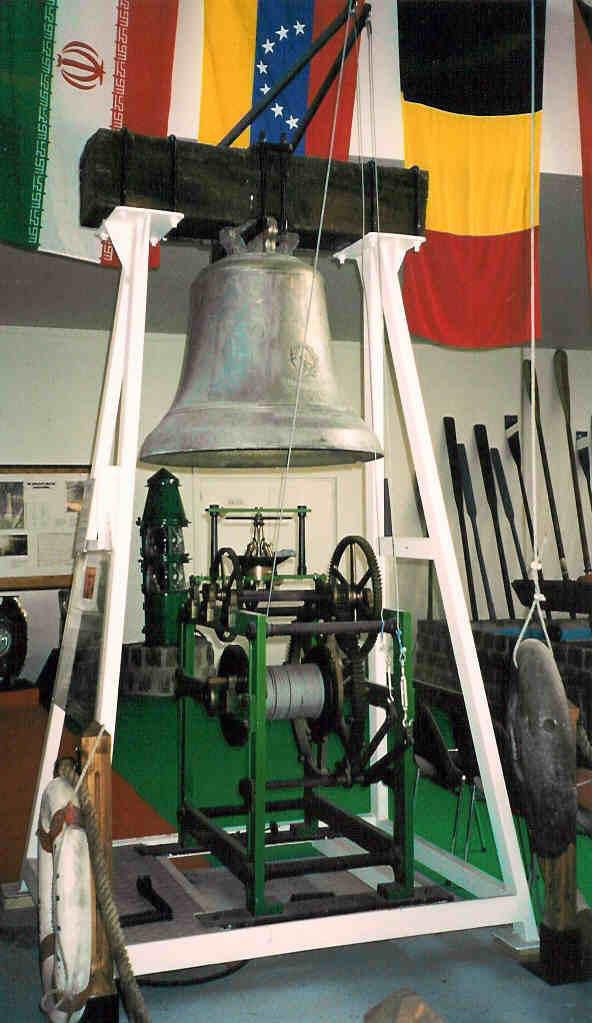
Fog warning bell, formerly located in the estuary of the Risle

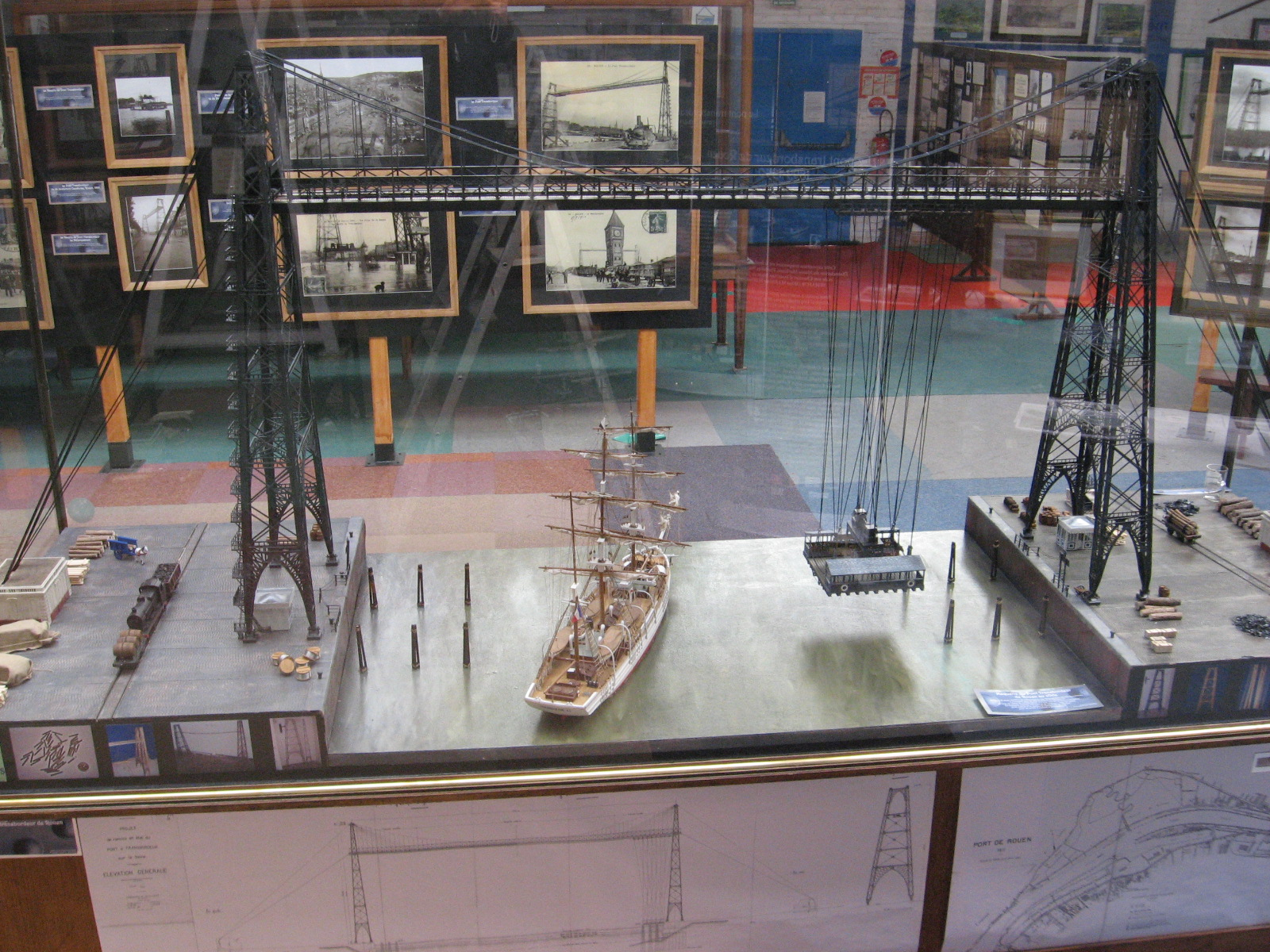
Model of the Rouen transporter bridge

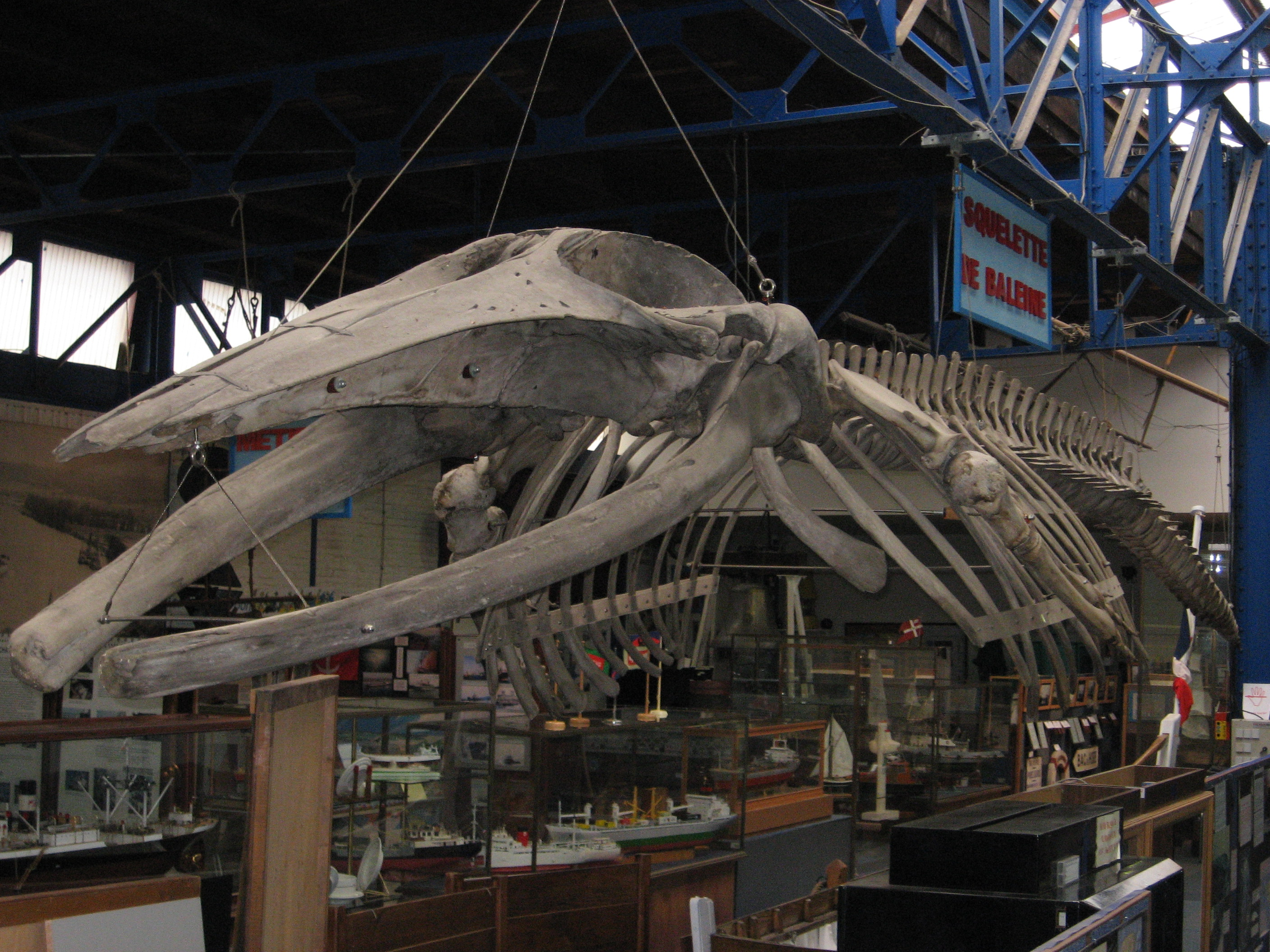
Whale skeleton

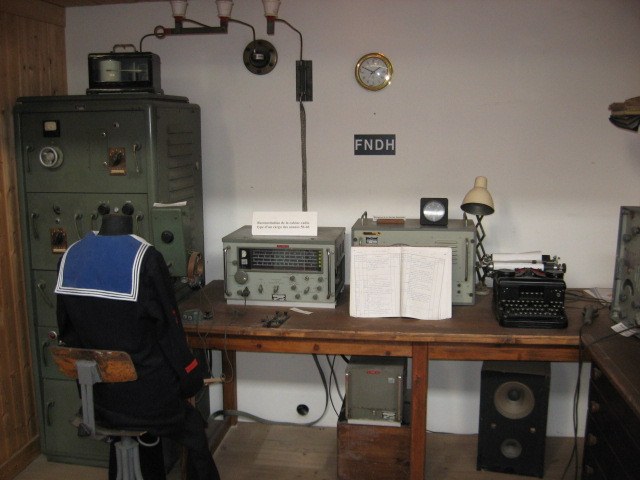
Reproduction of the radio cabin of a 1960s ship

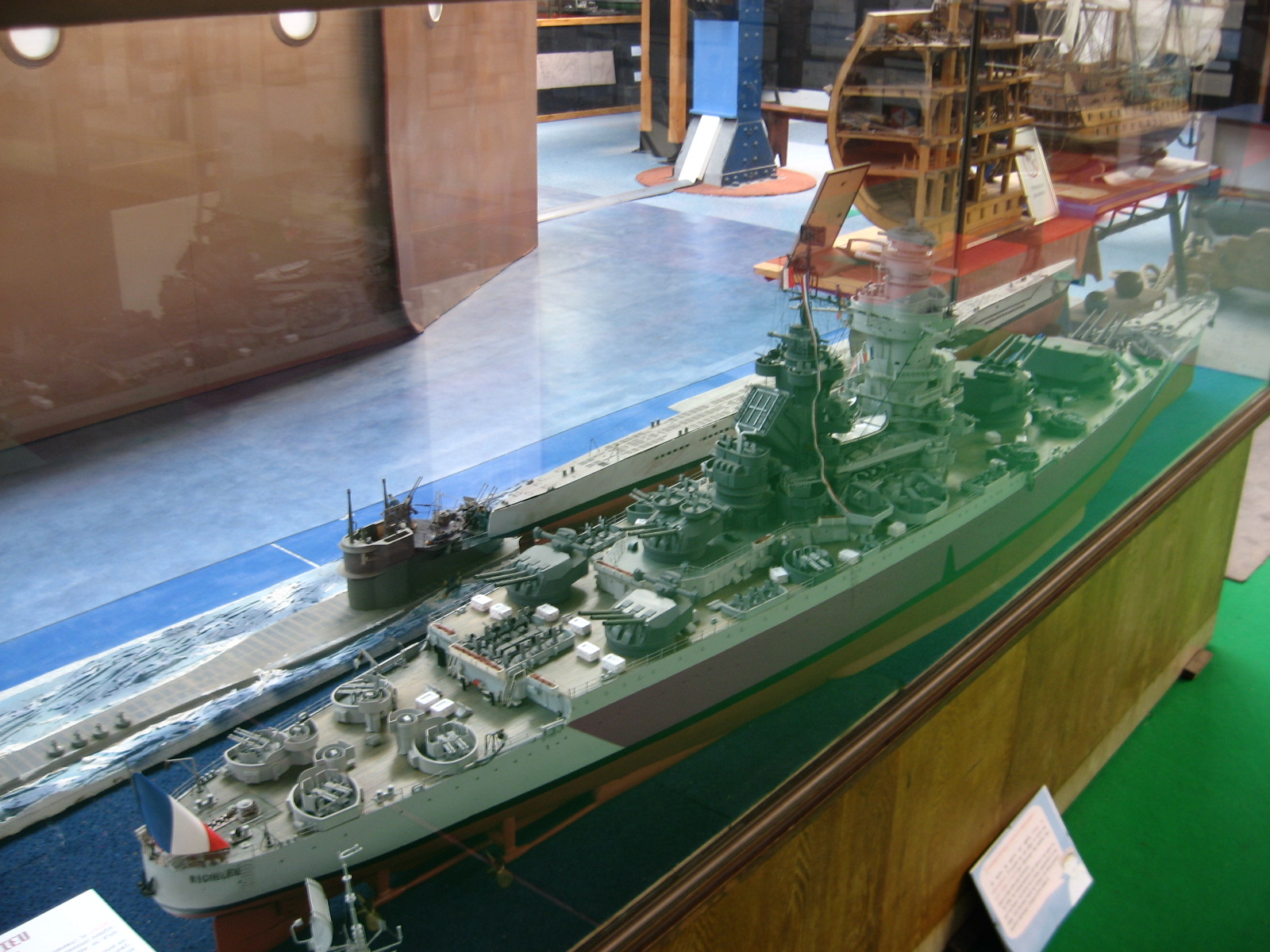
Model of the 1939 French battleship Richelieu

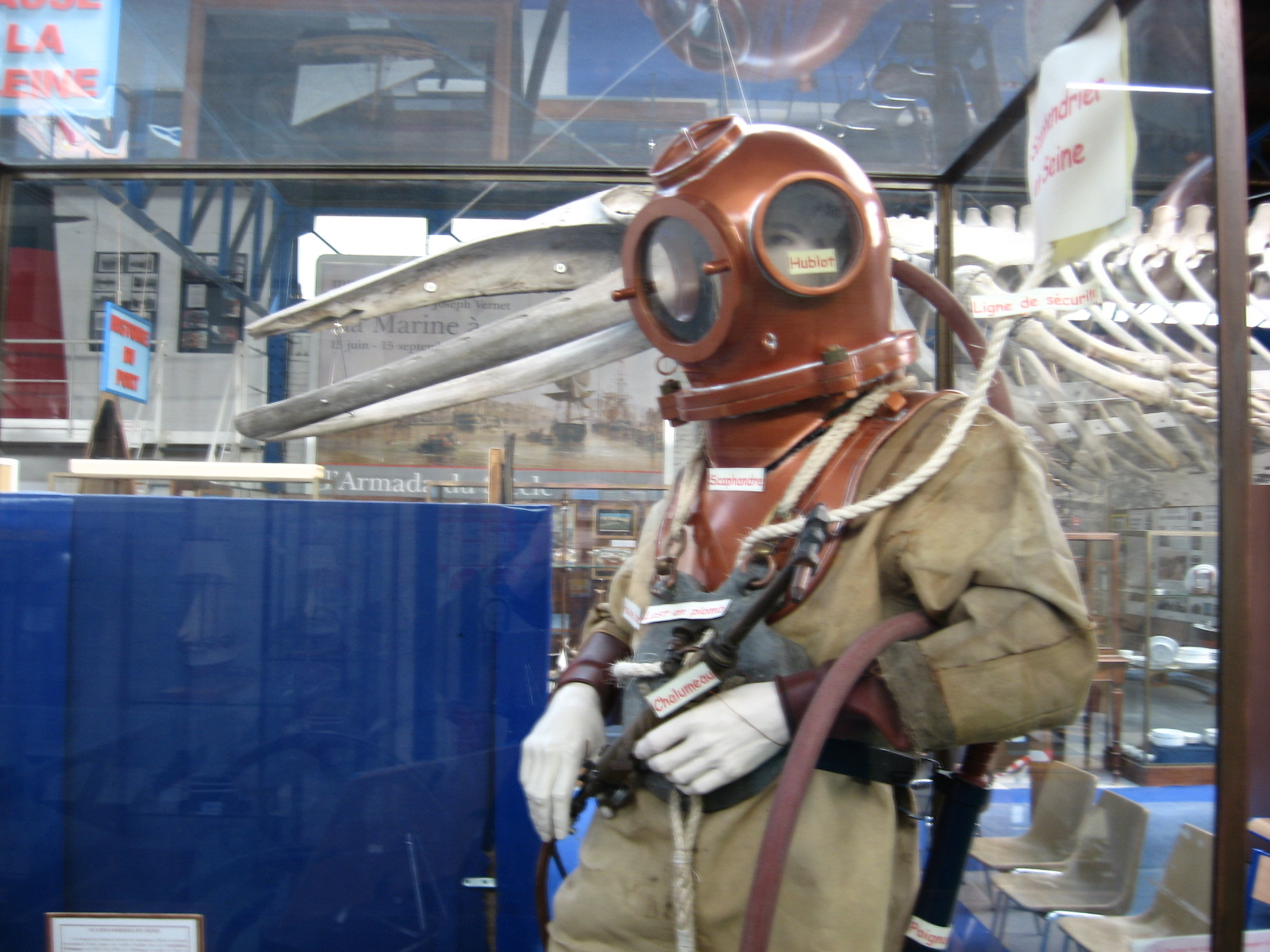
Diving gear

== The site ==
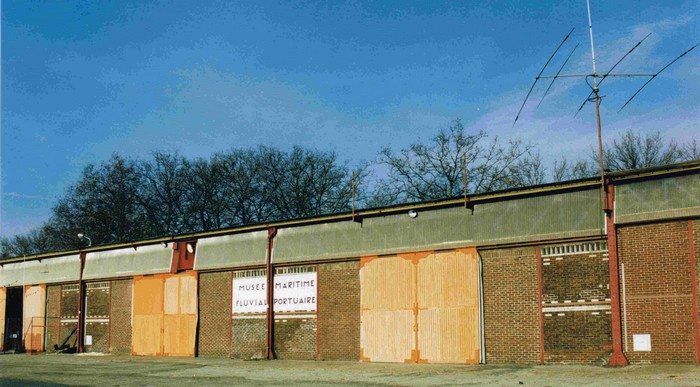
Building 13, where the museum is located

The museum is located in a former port building, Building 13, not far from the new Gustave Flaubert Bridge. The building was built in 1926, and was called Building M until 1966, when the Autonomous Port of Rouen (Port autonome de Rouen) was created.

Until the 1970s it was leased to the Schiaffino Company, which transported wine between Rouen and North Africa and used it as a wine warehouse until a special wine building was built, and thereafter mainly for fruit.

The building was subsequently used by a series of different companies until 1984, when it became surplus because of insufficient size.

== See also ==
- Maritime museum
