= Pont Gustave-Flaubert =

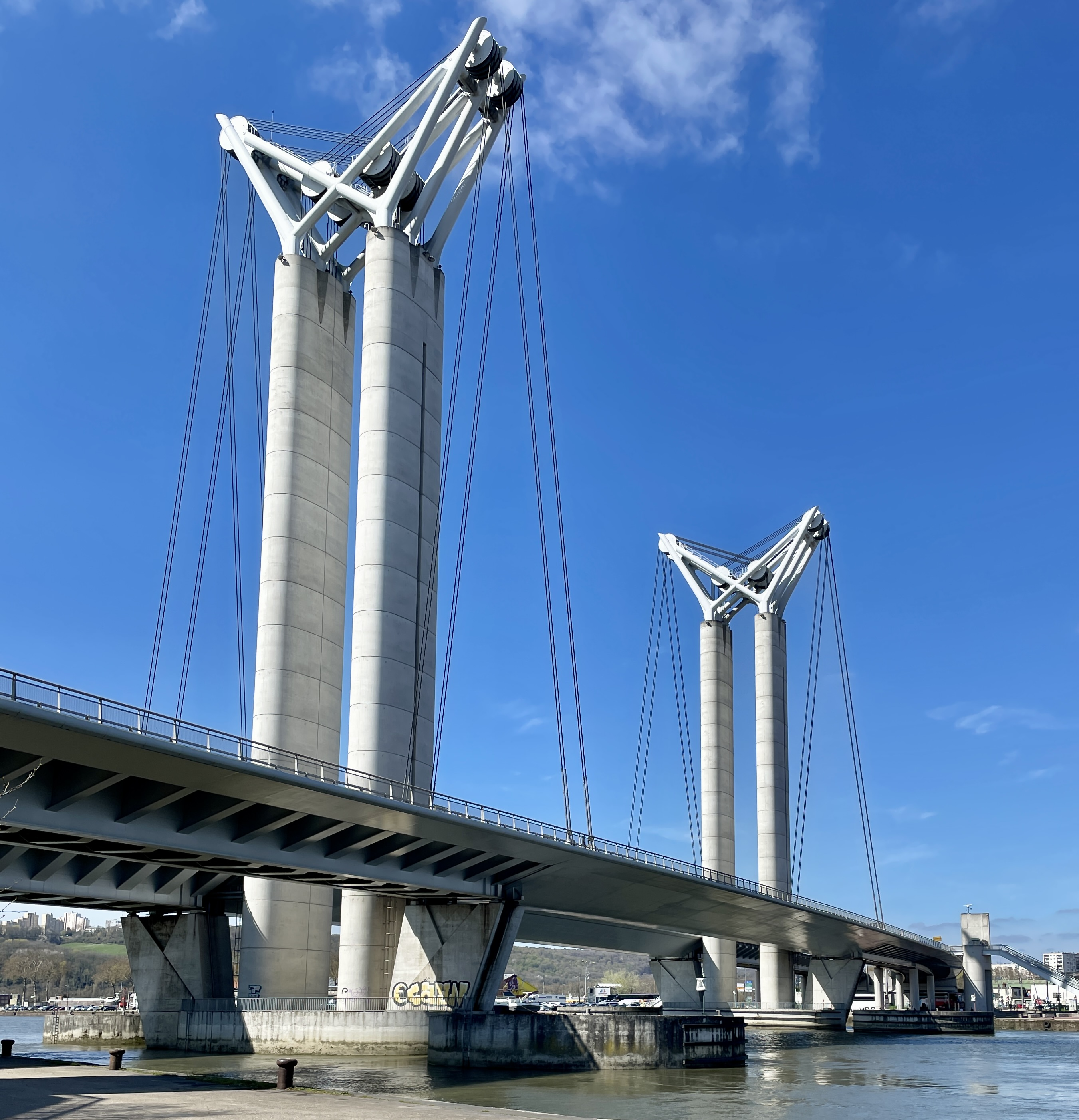
- Pont Gustave-Flaubert in 2023
- Coordinates: 49°26′37″N 01°03′51″E
- Crosses: Seine
- Locale: Rouen, Seine-Maritime, Normandy, France

Characteristics
- Design: Vertical-lift bridge
- Material: Concrete and steel
- Total length: 670 m (2,200 ft)
- Longest span: 100 m (330 ft)
- Clearance below: 7 m (23 ft) (closed); 55 m (180 ft) (open)

History
- Construction start: 2004
- Construction end: 2007
- Construction cost: €60 million (bridge) €137 million (entire project)
- Opened: 25 September 2008

Statistics
- Daily traffic: 50,000 vehicles/day (predicted)

Location
- Interactive map of Pont Gustave-Flaubert

The Pont Gustave-Flaubert (English: Gustave Flaubert Bridge) is a vertical-lift bridge over the river Seine in Rouen, Seine-Maritime, Normandy, France. It was officially opened on 25 September 2008 after four years of construction.

The bridge itself cost approximately €60 million to build. Additional costs, including work to surrounding infrastructure and approach roads, brought the total cost to €137 million. Construction began in June 2004. Rouen City Council named the bridge after the 19th-century novelist Gustave Flaubert, who was born and died in Rouen.

== History ==
The design team included the engineering firm Arcadis NV and the consultancy firm Eurodim. The specialist machinery was designed by Aymeric Zublena, one of the architects of the Stade de France, and Michel Virlogeux, designer of the Pont de Normandie Bridge and the Millau Viaduct.

=== Construction ===
The contract for the bridge construction, without the approaching viaducts, was €60 million. It was won by Quille, a subsidiary of Bouygues, in association with the Eiffel company, Eiffage and the Belgian firm Victor Buyck. The déclaration d'utilité publique passed in September 2001.

Work began in June 2004 and the installation of "butterflies" (supporting trusses) at the top of the stanchions was completed on 16 and 17 August 2006; the approaches were completed on 21 and 22 August 2006.

On 14 April 2007, the barque Belem, which had been docked for a month, went under the bridge, after initial tests that allowed the bridge to lift enough to let her pass. A crowd from Rouen was present to celebrate the event.

=== Name ===
The bridge is named after the writer Gustave Flaubert. The name was finally chosen on 15 December 2006 by the Rouen City Council, after consultation with the people of Rouen who had a choice between Flaubert and René-Robert Cavelier, Sieur de La Salle. It was previously known as "the sixth bridge".

== Location ==
Two general routes were considered:

- A crossing of the Seine west of Grand Quevilly
- A crossing of the Seine east of Grand Quevilly and Petit Quevilly

The western route was dismissed because of the hilly, afforested terrain, and the second route chosen because of its greater proximity to the residential and business areas of central Rouen.

The bridge is near the interchange of the Autoroute de Normandie (A13), at its southern approach, via the RN338, A150 autoroute (from Barentin and Dieppe) and the slip road which connects the A29 and A28.

This link was intended to help the western districts of Rouen while providing the necessary connections to the industrial and commercial areas, and the Port of Rouen. Near its base at the right bank is an old port area undergoing redevelopment. The Maritime, Fluvial and Harbour Museum of Rouen is in this area. The left bank is a brownfield site that will probably be sold for redevelopment.

== Structure ==
Several types of structure were considered. The essential requirement was to construct a Seine river crossing which allowed large vessels access to the Port of Rouen, upstream.

- Fixed bridge, sea gauge: it would have been necessary for this type of structure to provide a clearance height of 55 metres (180 ft) at the highest tide. But it would have been difficult to provide the approach roads, especially if their gradients were to be kept reasonably low, and it would not have been possible to provide interchanges near the bridge itself. However, this solution was used for the Cheviré Bridge that crosses the river Loire between at Nantes.
- Tunnel: this solution is expensive – both in construction and operation – and poses safety problems for the transportation of hazardous materials. Moreover, it is difficult to provide interchanges close to the river. This solution was used for the tunnel in the Old Port of Marseille.
- Fixed bridge, river gauge: this solution limits the clearance height to 7 metres (23 ft), which obviously prevents access for larger ships, both cargo and cruise ships which enter the heart of the city, and for ships entering the Rouen Armada. a pentennial festival of tall ships.

These various unsatisfactory solutions led the client to consider the fact that large ships only needed access beyond the bridge 20 to 30 times a year, so that three kinds of moveable bridge were considered:

- bascule bridge: A difficulty here was of piling the supporting pillars in the Seine riverbed so as to avoid very large spans. This solution was chosen for the Seyne-sur-Mer lift bridge and Tower Bridge in London.
- swing bridge, which has the disadvantage of requiring both sides of the approach to be at the same level, and requires a great deal of reinforcement. This solution was used on the Caronte Bridge.
- lift bridge. This solution requires the construction of high-rise towers on both sides. This is the type of structure implemented in Brest for the Pont de Recouvrance.

All these potential solutions have their advantages and disadvantages. In particular, moveable bridges totally cut the traffic flow when they are open to river traffic. However, in the end, a lift bridge was chosen.

== Features ==
The bridge is a lift bridge with a bridge span of 120 m (390 ft) and a total height of 86 m (282 ft). It is the third tallest building in Rouen, after Rouen Cathedral and the Archives Tower. The air draft (clearance) is 7 m (23 ft) when the deck is down, which still allows the passage of barges and smaller craft. It is 55 m (180 ft) above the Seine when raised. It is thus the tallest lift bridge in the world.. The total length, including the approach viaducts, is 670 m (2,200 ft).

The dual decks, each of which is 120 m (390 ft) long and weighs 1,300 tonnes (1,300 long tons; 1,400 short tons), is supported by four pylons (arranged in pairs) piled into the Seine riverbed. It takes twelve minutes fully to raise or lower the lift section.

== Operation ==
The lift section is expected to open around 30 times a year, in particular for the Rouen Armarda and for cruise ships who dock in the city centre (near the William the Conqueror Bridge). Traffic is projected at 50,000 vehicles a day, relieving central Rouen of around a quarter of the 190,000 trucks that cross the river each day.

Some have questioned its usefulness and believe that the bridge will rise far less. Owners of boats have said they will not take the risk of being stuck on the other side of the bridge in case of bridge failure. A new Pleasure Terminal has also already been built downstream.

== Gallery ==
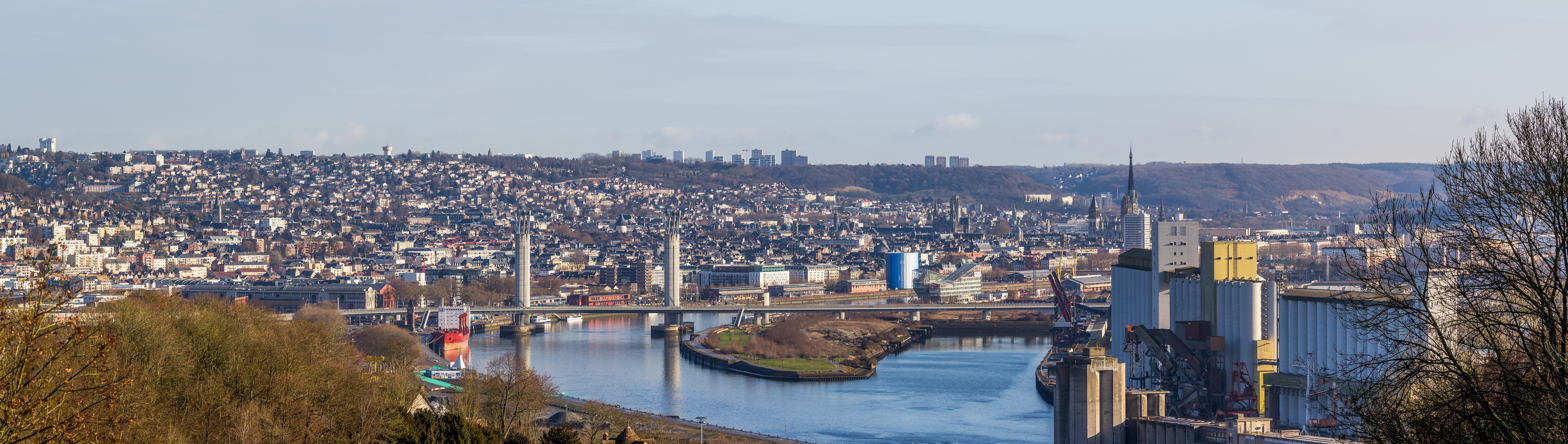

== See also ==
- List of crossings of the Seine
