= Pont de Recouvrance =

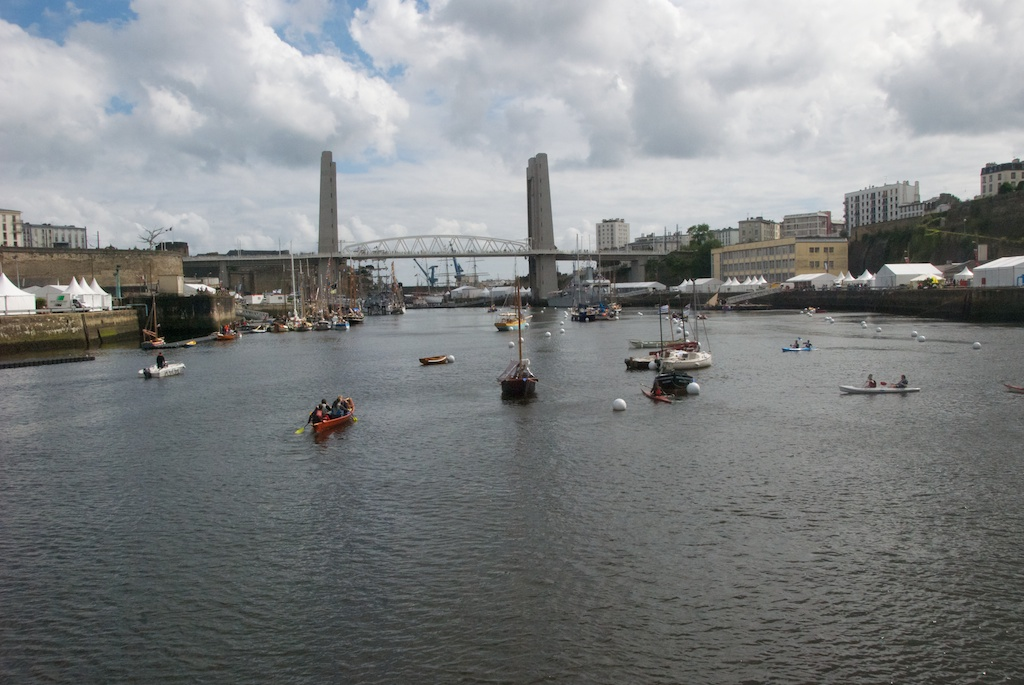
- The Pont de Recouvrance and the Penfeld
- Coordinates: 48°23′03.7″N 04°29′47.3″W
- Carries: Rue de Siam
- Crosses: Penfeld River
- Locale: Brest, Brittany, France

Characteristics
- Design: Vertical-lift bridge
- Material: Reinforced concrete, steel
- Height: 70m
- Longest span: 88 metres (289 ft)

History
- Construction start: 1950
- Construction end: 1954
- Opened: 1954

Location
- Interactive map of Pont de Recouvrance

The Pont de Recouvrance (French pronunciation: [pɔ̃ də ʁəkuvʁɑ̃s]; Breton: Pont an adtapout) is a vertical-lift bridge in Brest, France, across the river Penfeld. Opened on 17 July 1954, it was the largest vertical-lift bridge in Europe until the opening of the Rouen Pont Gustave-Flaubert in 2008. It links the bottom of the rue de Siam to the quartier de Recouvrance, replacing a swing bridge (the pont National) destroyed by Allied bombardment in 1944.

Each pylon is 70m high, and the 525-tonne lift span is 88m long.

== Trolley bus ==
The bridge was crossed by trolleybuses from its opening in 1954 until the closure of the Brest trolleybus system, in 1970.

== Trams ==
The lift span was renovated in 2011 to allow the new tram line to cross the bridge. The tram line opened by July 2012.

== Sources ==
- Le pont levant de Brest, brochure edited by La Télémécanique Électrique (1954 ?)
