= Recouvrance, Brest =

Coordinates: 48°23′18″N 4°30′01″W

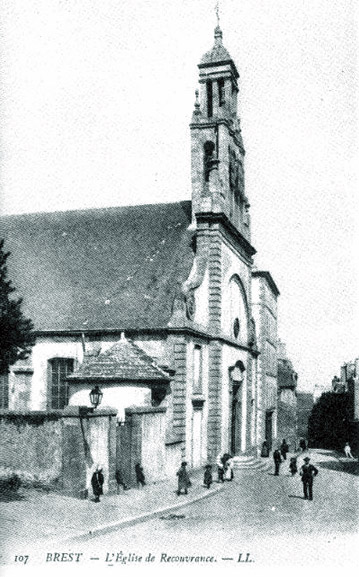
The church of Saint-Sauveur in Recouvrance, the oldest parish church in Brest

Recouvrance (Breton: Adsevel) is the section of the city of Brest, France, on the right bank of the River Penfeld. The popular and historically-Breton quarter is in contrast to the largely-Francophone quarter of Brest-même or Brest-proper, on the left bank.

The lift bridge over the Penfeld was named after this neighbourhood, as was a schooner that was built in 1992 in the city.

== See also ==
- Saint-Sauveur Church in Brest
