= Celes =

Celes may refer to:

- Celes (grasshopper), a genus of the bandwing grasshopper
- Celes Ernesto Cárcamo (1903–1990), Argentine psychiatrist
- Celes Kobayashi (born 1973), Japanese boxer
- Celes Chere, a female character in the video game Final Fantasy VI
- Celestia "Celes" Ludenberg, a character in the video game Danganronpa: Trigger Happy Havoc
- Cele Clan, a sub-branch of the Mthethwa kingdom; see Qwabe § Expansion and political structure
- Celes, an ancient Greek boat

== See also ==
- Seles (disambiguation)
