= Cárcamo =

Cárcamo is a surname. Notable people with the surname include:

- Celes Ernesto Cárcamo (1903–1990), Argentine psychiatrist
- Juan Manuel Cárcamo (born 1974), Honduran footballer
- Leonel Cárcamo (born 1965), Salvadoran footballer
- Martín Cárcamo (born 1975), Chilean television presenter and actor

== See also ==
- Caccamo (surname)
