= Brest Maritime Festival =

Maritime festival in Brest, France

Brest International Maritime Festival Fêtes maritimes internationales de Brest
- Logo of the 2020 edition
- Frequency: 4 years
- Locations: Brest, Finistère
- Country: France
- Inaugurated: 1992
- Attendance: 712,000 (for the 2016 edition)
- Organiser: Brest Événements nautiques
- Website: brest-evenements-nautiques.fr, www.brest2020.fr

The Brest International Maritime Festival (French: Fêtes maritimes internationales de Brest) is a gathering of traditional boats from around the world, taking place for a week every four years in Brest, France.

Each edition took the name of the city of Brest, followed by the year: Brest 1992, Brest 1996, Brest 2000, Brest 2004, Brest 2008; for the 2012 edition, the festival was named Les Tonnerres de Brest, then in 2016, Brest International Maritime Festival 2016.

== History ==
This maritime event was initially born by the organization of gatherings of boats and popular festivals at the quay in the 1980s, called Pors Beac'h in 1980, 1982 (23, 24 and 25 July) and 1984 (9 to 12 August), small port of Logonna-Daoulas, at the bottom of the roadstead of Brest. The organization was then ensured by the Groupe Finistérien de Croisière Association of Jakez Kerhoas and the help of the founders of the magazine Chasse-Marée.

In 1986 and 1988, it was in Douarnenez that this gathering was organized by this same association. In 1986, 400 traditional sailboats were registered there and 10,000 spectators went there. Thanks to the popular success of this event and the support of public authorities, initiatives to restore traditional boats and the construction of replicas of old model boats are multiplying.

After Douarnenez '88, great impetus was given by the Bateaux des côtes de France competition sponsored by the magazine Chasse-marée in 1990, in order to participate in the first major international gathering of Brest & Douarnenez 1992. Boats, replicas of old ones, were built from traditional rules in local shipyards and festive launches occur on occasion. Other old boats are also restored for this future event.

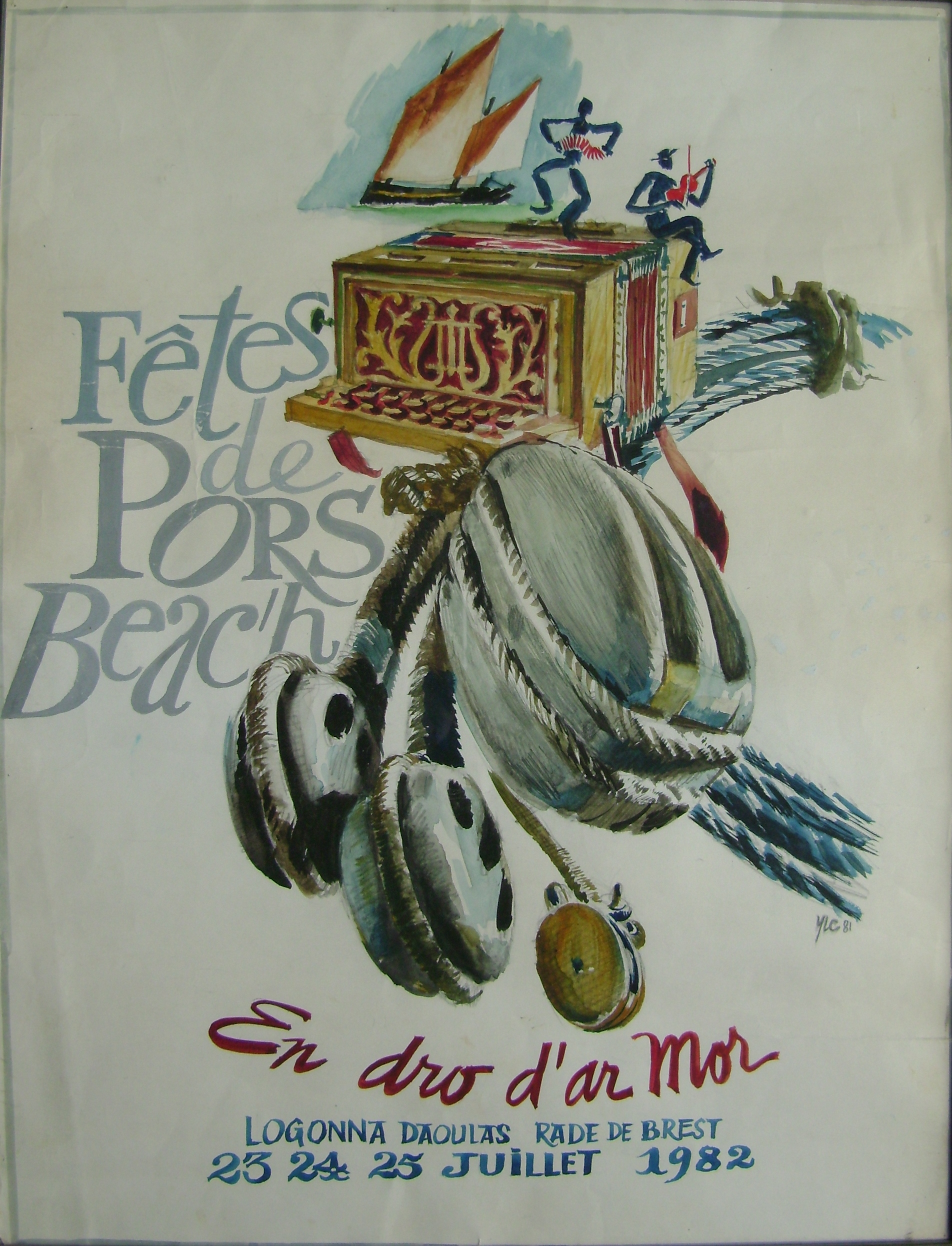
Pors Beac'h 82 poster

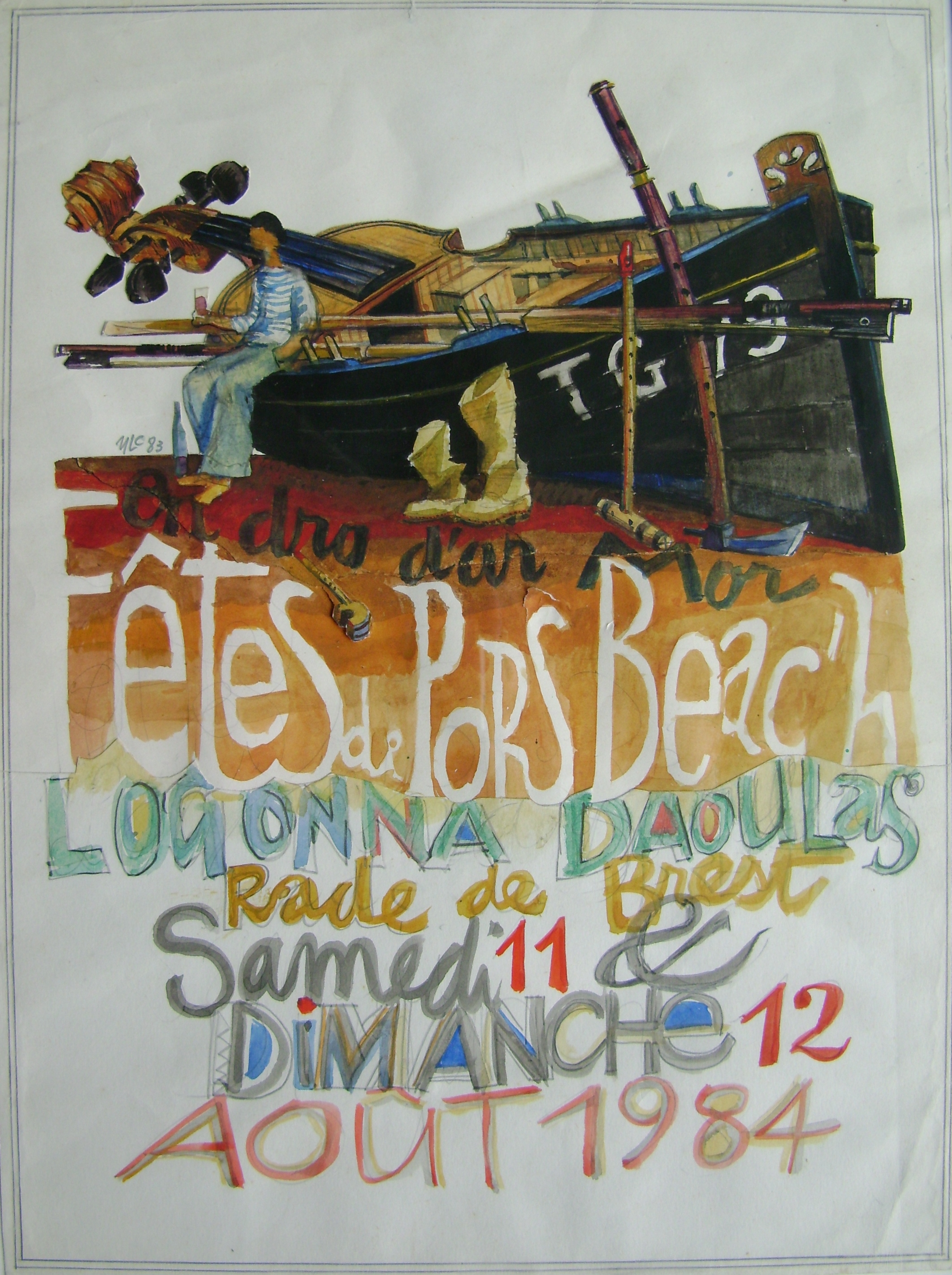
Pors Beac'h 84 poster

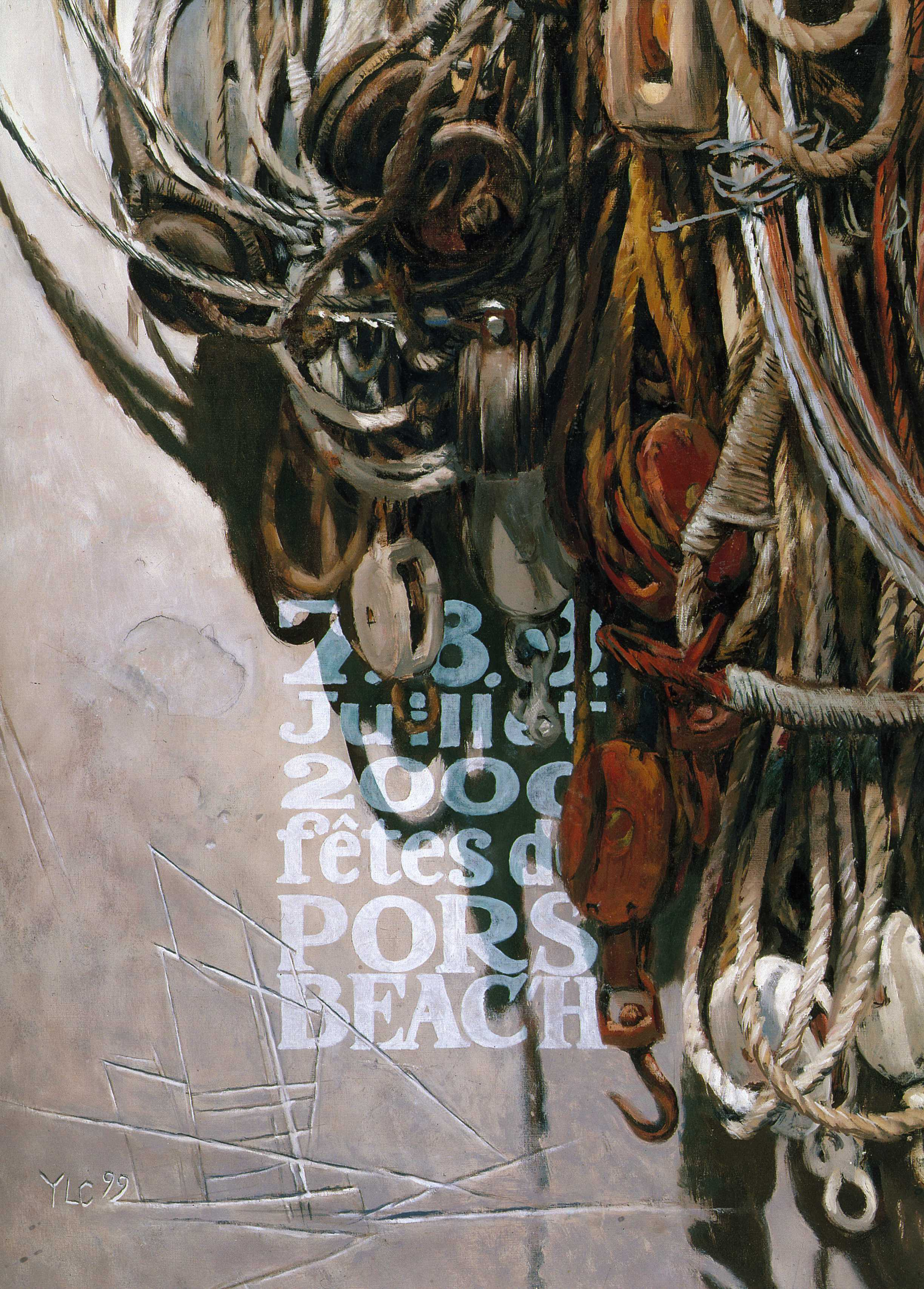
20th anniversary poster

=== 1992 edition ===
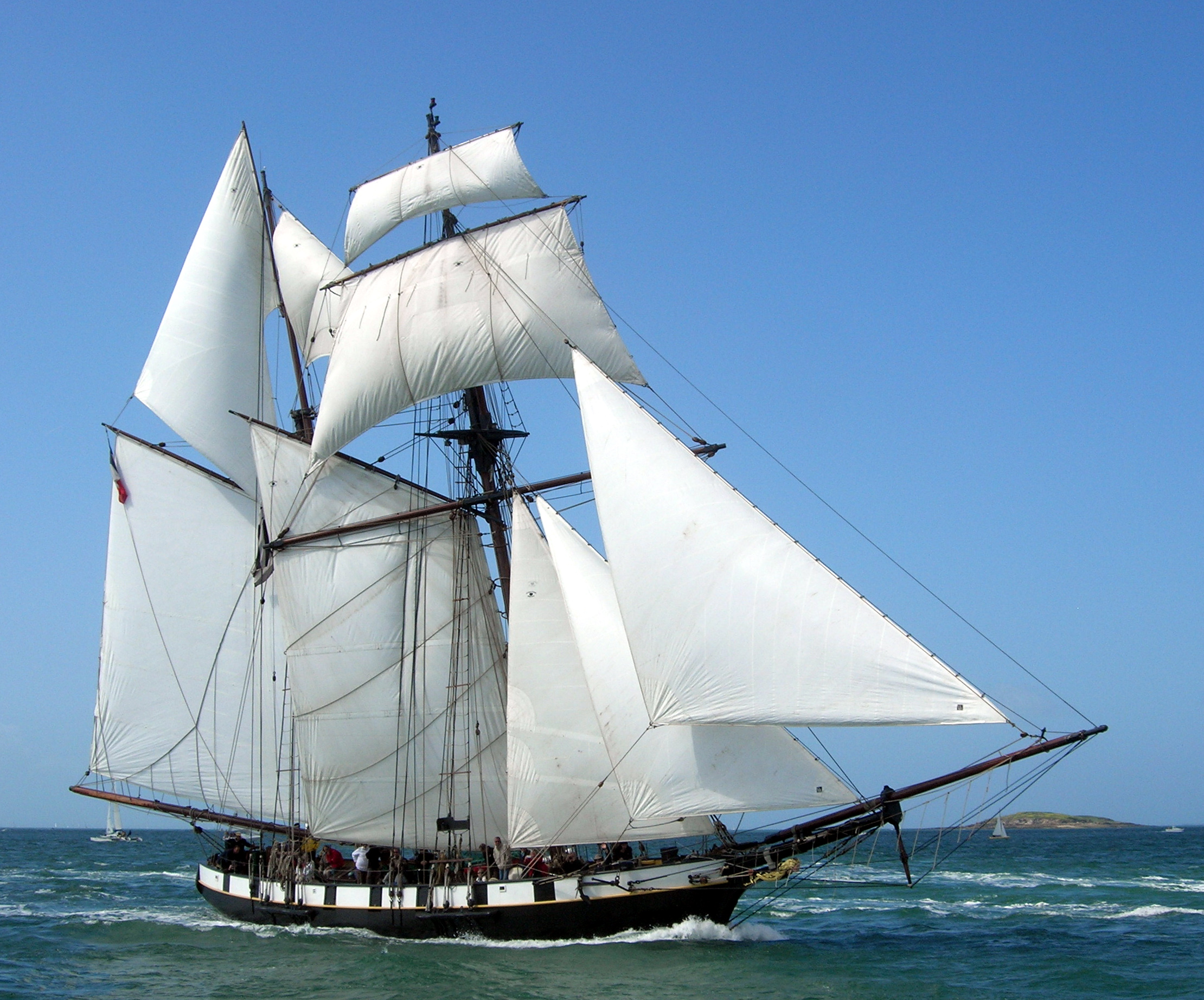
La Recouvrance

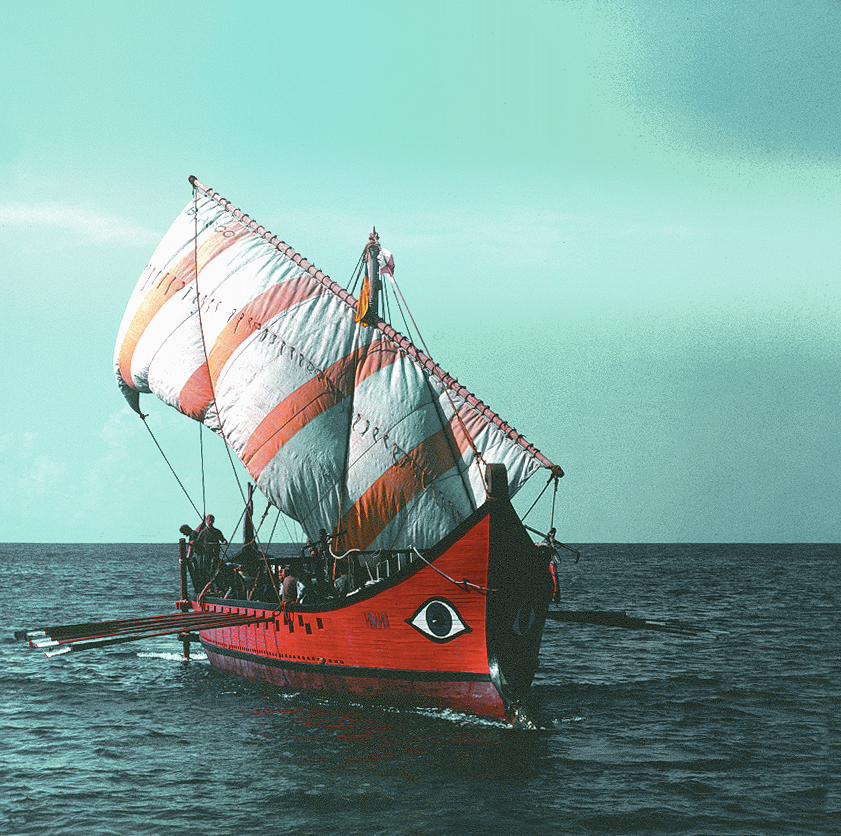
Ivlia (bireme)

Douarnenez was no longer large enough to accommodate so many boats, so the festival joined the port of Brest. The first edition took place from July 10 to 14, 1992. The SARL Grand Large was created by Jakez Kerhoas and Anne Burlat, which served as an assistance for the Brest & Douarnenez 1992 event, and the following ones.

During this gathering, the launch of La Recouvrance took place, a topsail schooner replica of a sloop from the beginning of the 19th century, Recouvrance being one of the districts of Brest.

Many replicas of traditional boats, built on this occasion, according to the traditional rules of maritime heritage, are present such as the Biche, the Belle-Étoile, the Corentin, the Dalh-Mad and the Loch Monna.

La Marie-Claudine (BR787127Y), a 9.6m two-mast open-top replica boat built in 1991, was the most awarded in the competition.

Ivlia, replica of an ancient Greek galley, participated in Brest '92.

Douarnenez prolonged the maritime festival by welcoming boats after the maritime festival in Brest.

=== 1996 edition ===
Brest 1996: from July 13 to 20, 1996.

Brest was celebrating the 100th anniversary of Belem and the launch of the restored Notre Dame de Rumengol, listed as a historical monument.

Some tall ships present:

- Pride of Baltimore II - United States;
- HMS Rose - United States;
- Kaskelot - United Kingdom;
- Matthew - United Kingdom;
- Khersones - Ukraine;
- Statsraad Lehmkuhl - Norway ;
- Christian Radich - Norway ;
- Thalassa - Netherlands;
- Tecla - Netherlands;
- Oosterschelde - Netherlands;
- Antigua - Netherlands
- Swan - Poland;
- Recouvrance - France;
- Belle Poule (1932) - France;
- Étoile (1932) - France.

=== 2000 edition ===
During the edition of Brest 2000, from July 13 to July 17, 2000, around thirty Bantry skiffs, built throughout France following a competition by Chasse-Marée magazine, competed in sailing and rowing regattas.

=== 2004 edition ===
On the occasion of Brest 2004 (from July 10 to July 15), the festival welcomed around 2,000 sailboats from 30 different nations. A large maritime parade took place from Brest to Douarnenez on July 16.

=== 2008 edition. ===
The fifth Brest 2008 edition took place from July 11 to July 17, 2008. It ended with a regatta around the Crozon peninsula to Douarnenez.

Images from Brest 2008

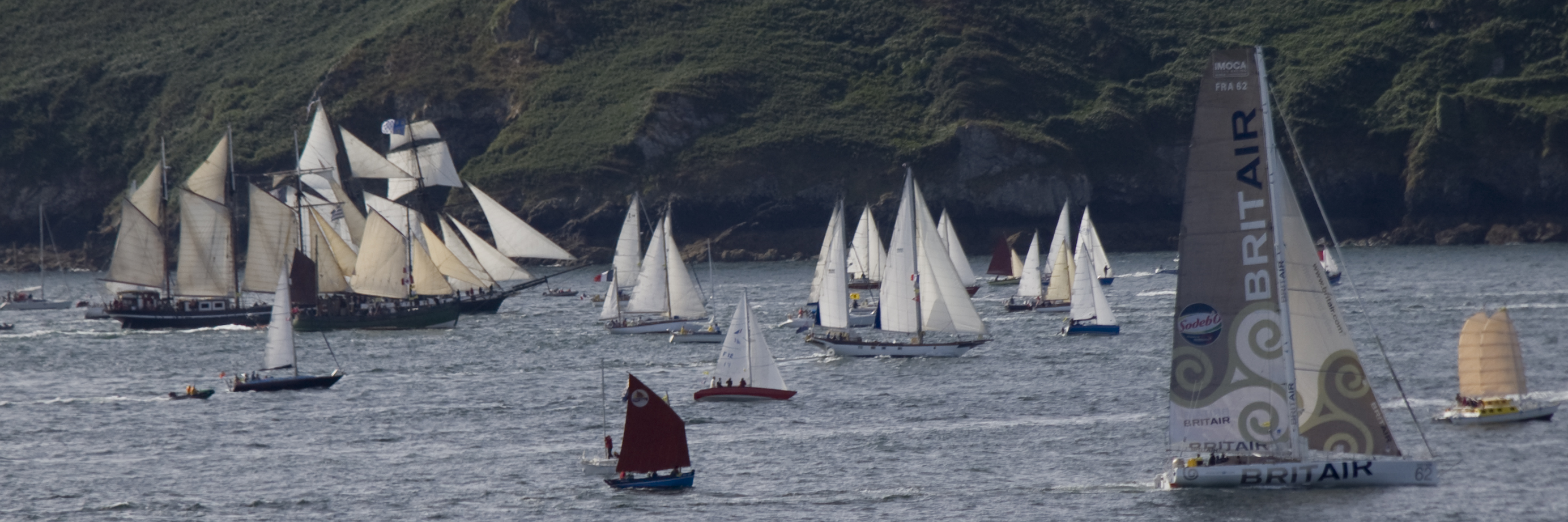
Boats leaving Brest for Douarnenez

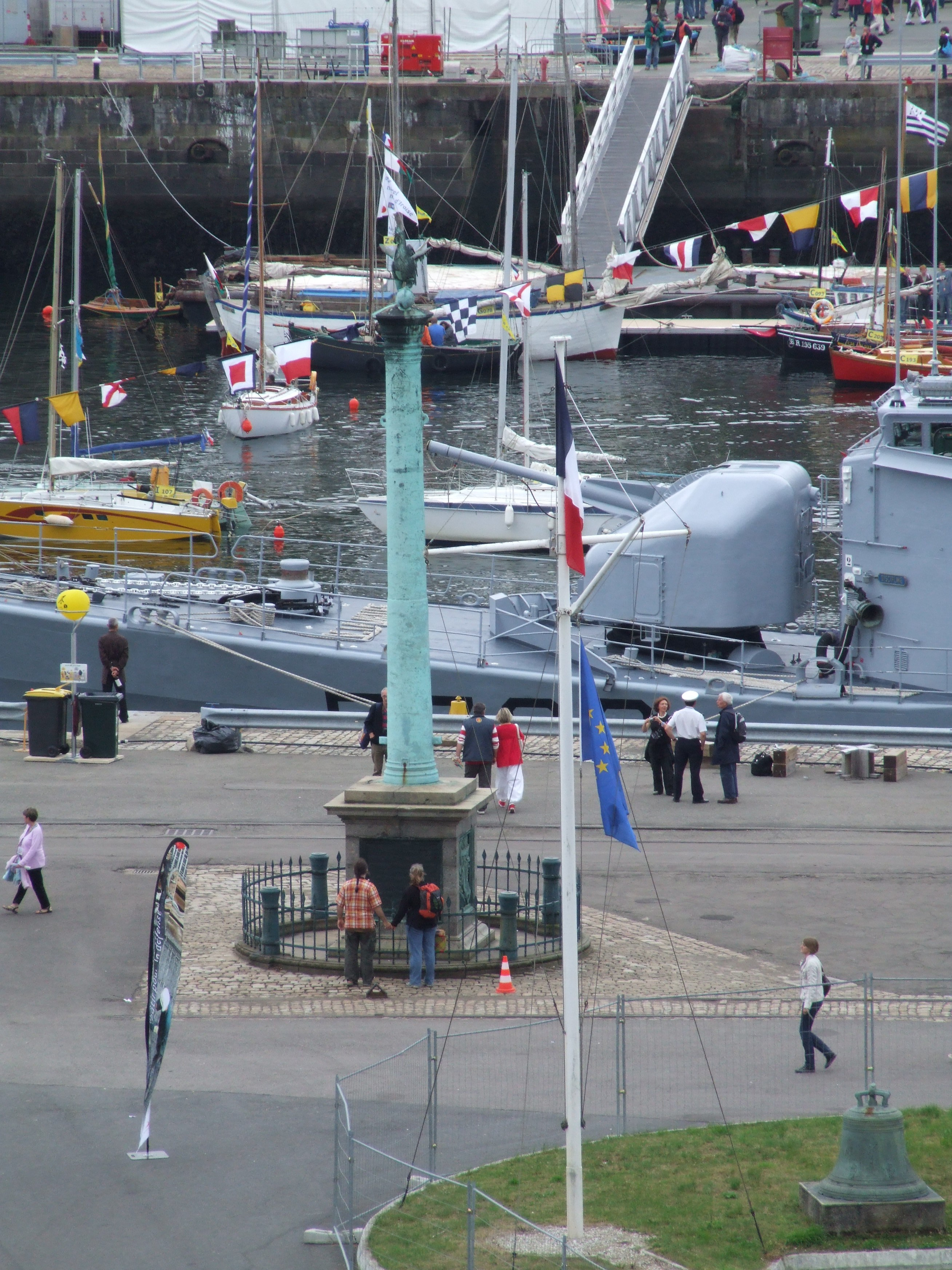
The quays of Penfeld with La Consulaire during the Festival.

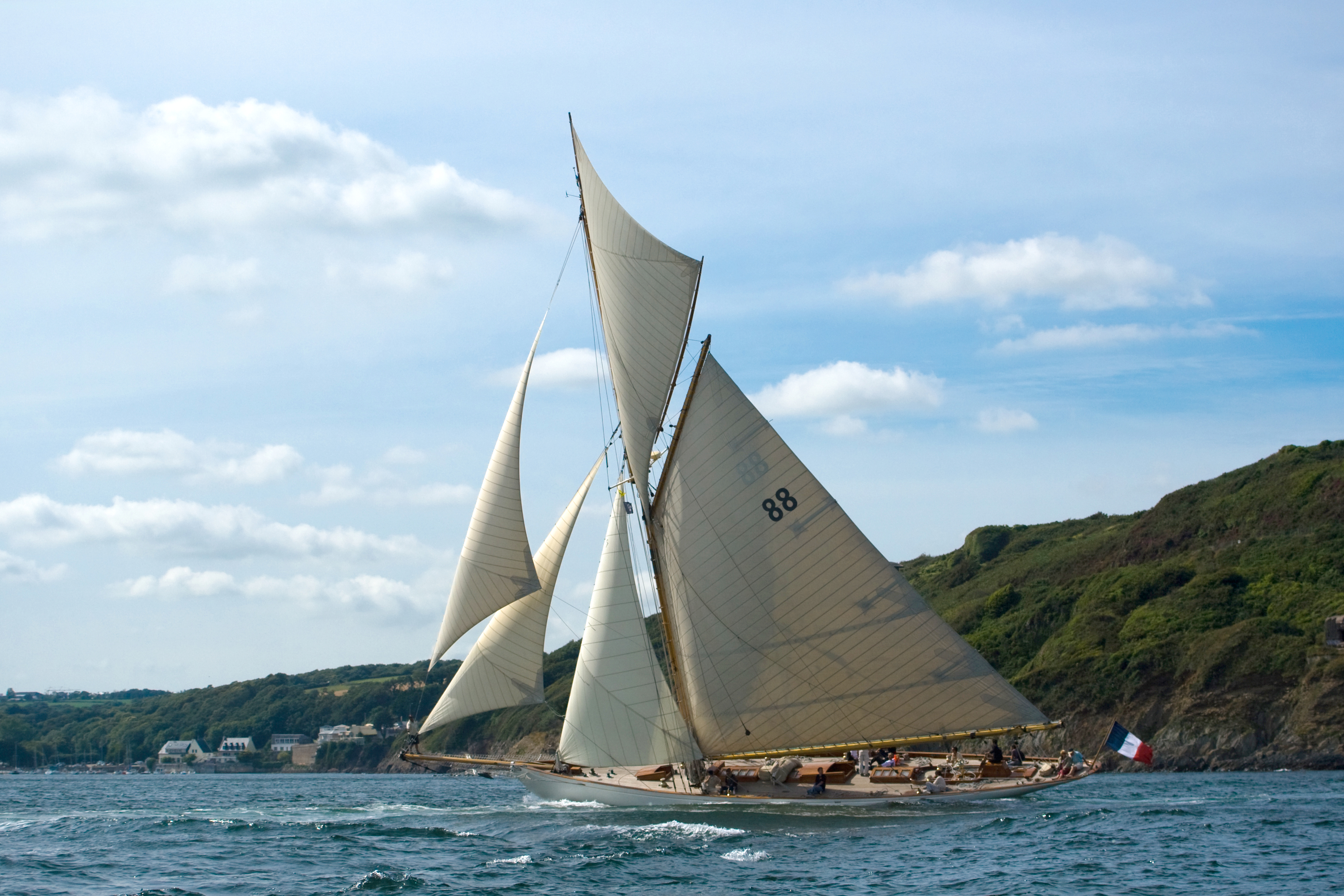
Moonbeam III during the Brest 2008 maritime festival.

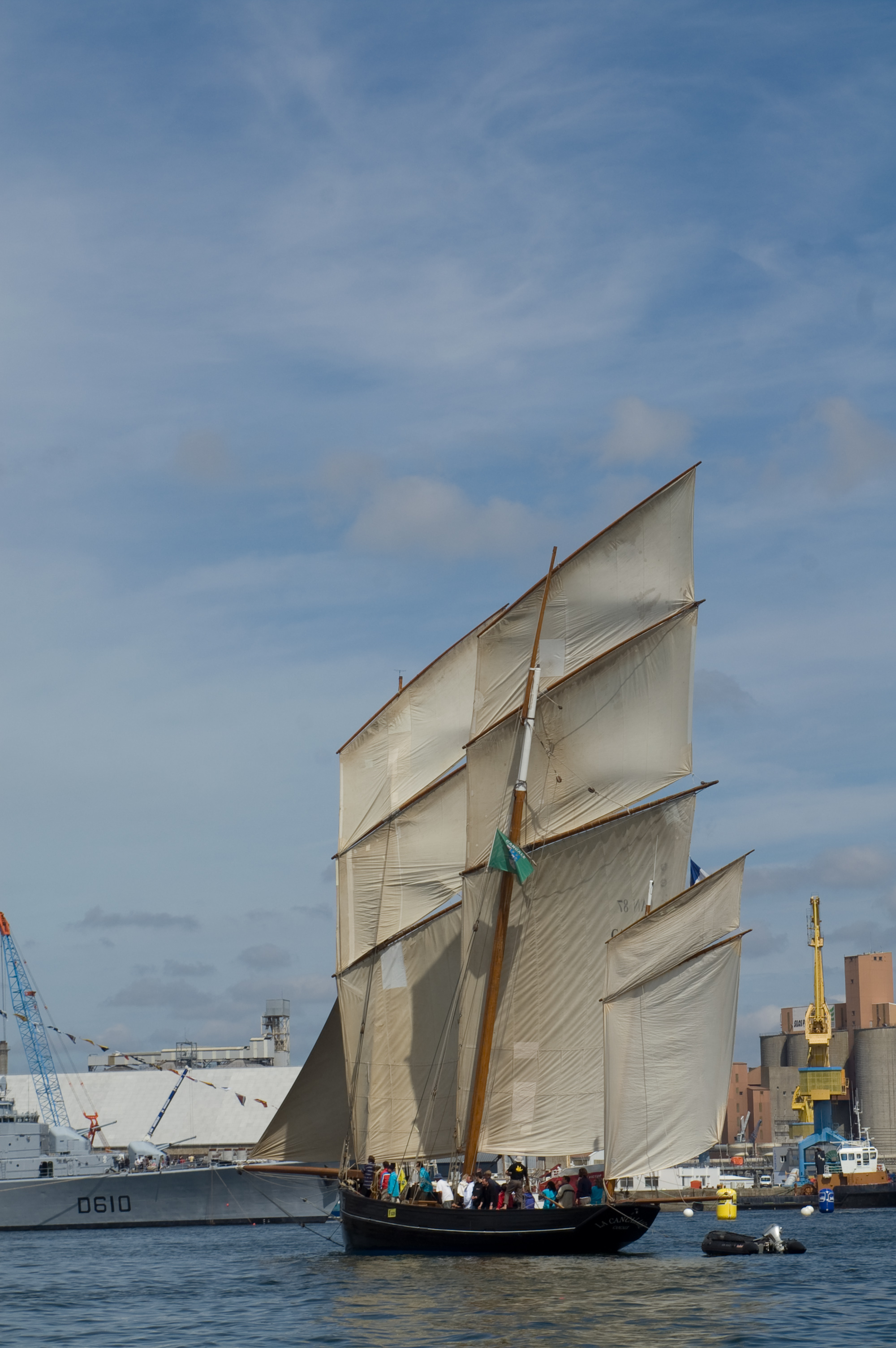
The Bisquine La Cancalaise.

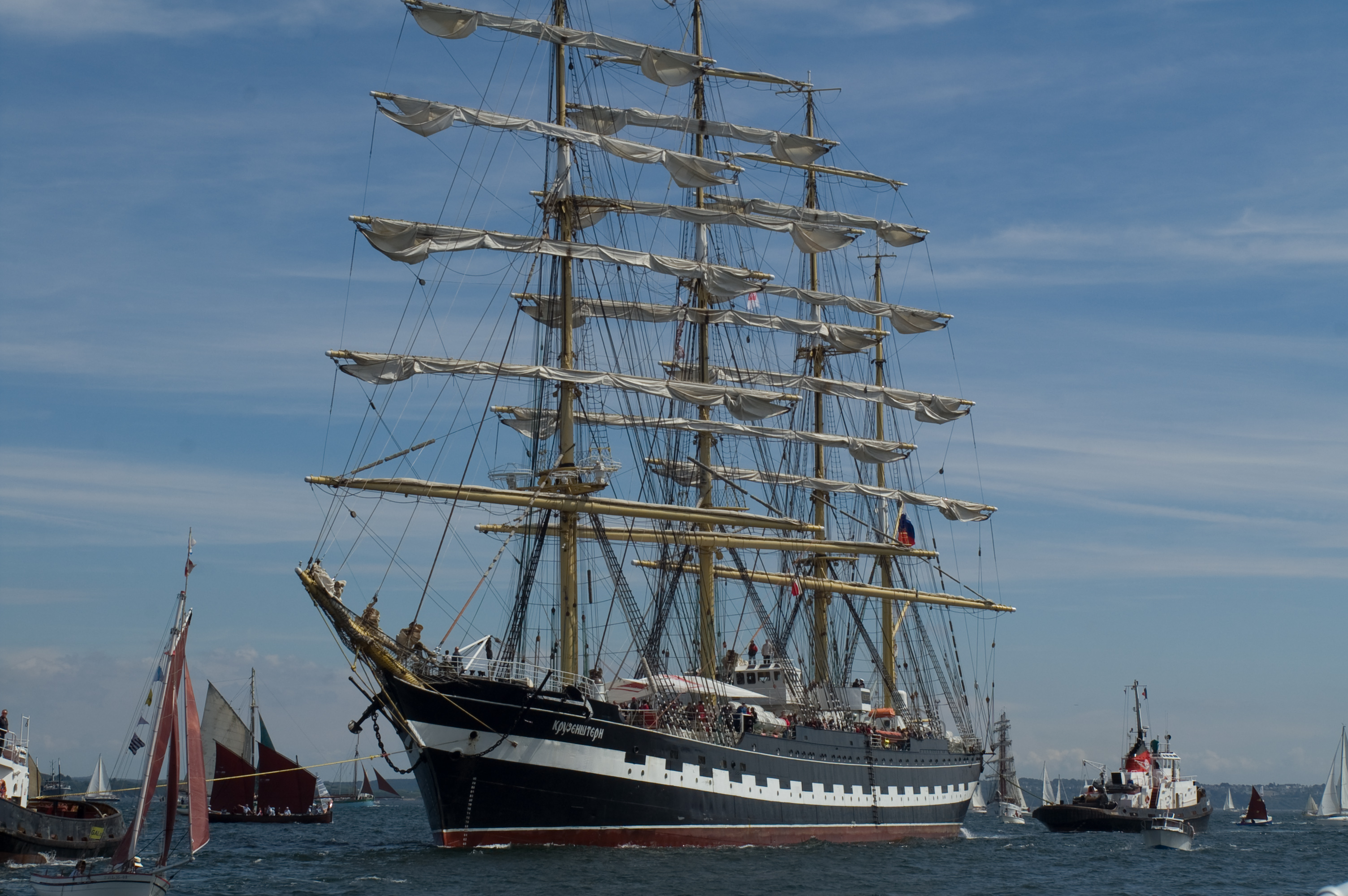
The Russian ship Krusenstern

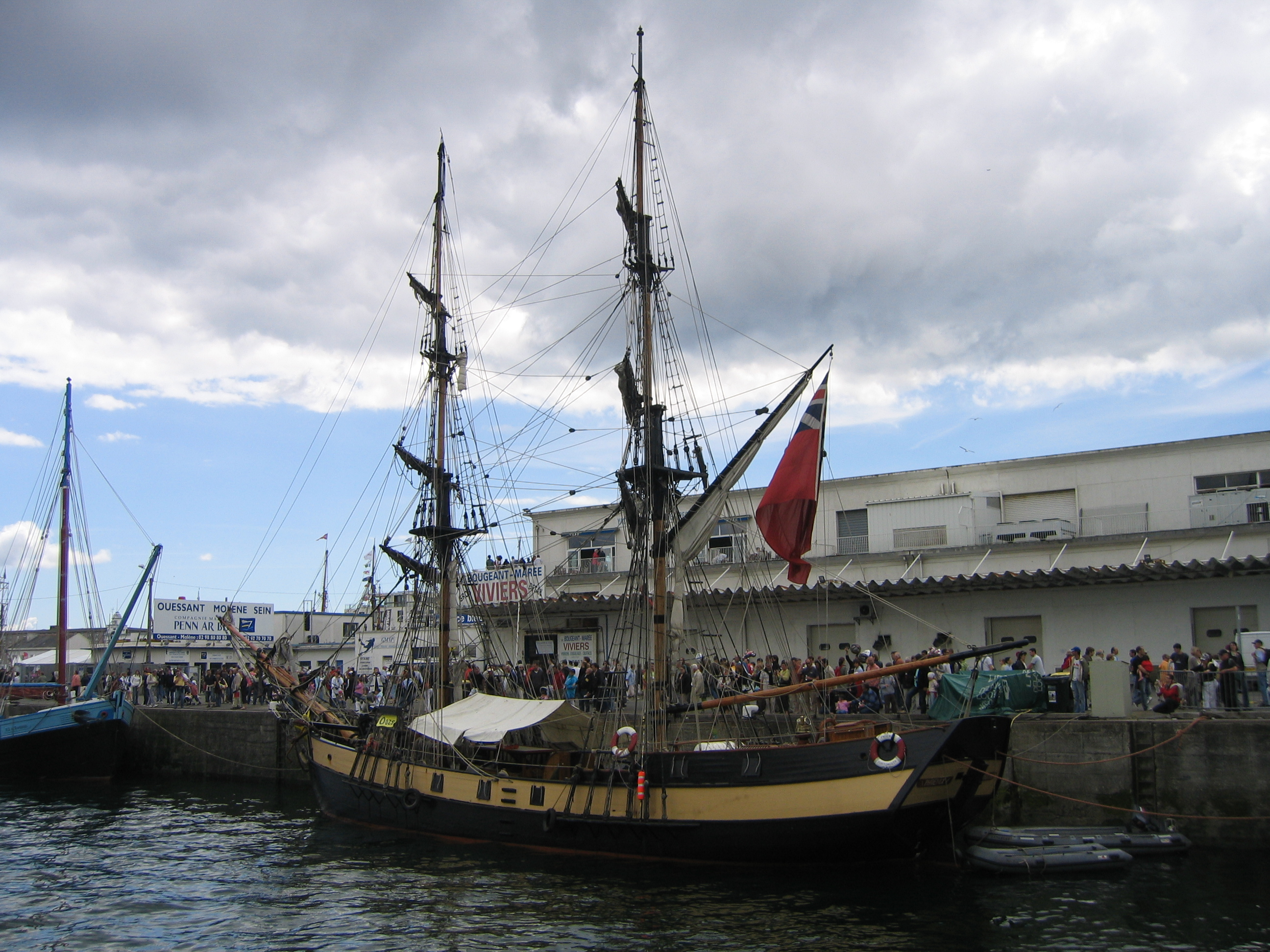
Phoenix of Bristol docked

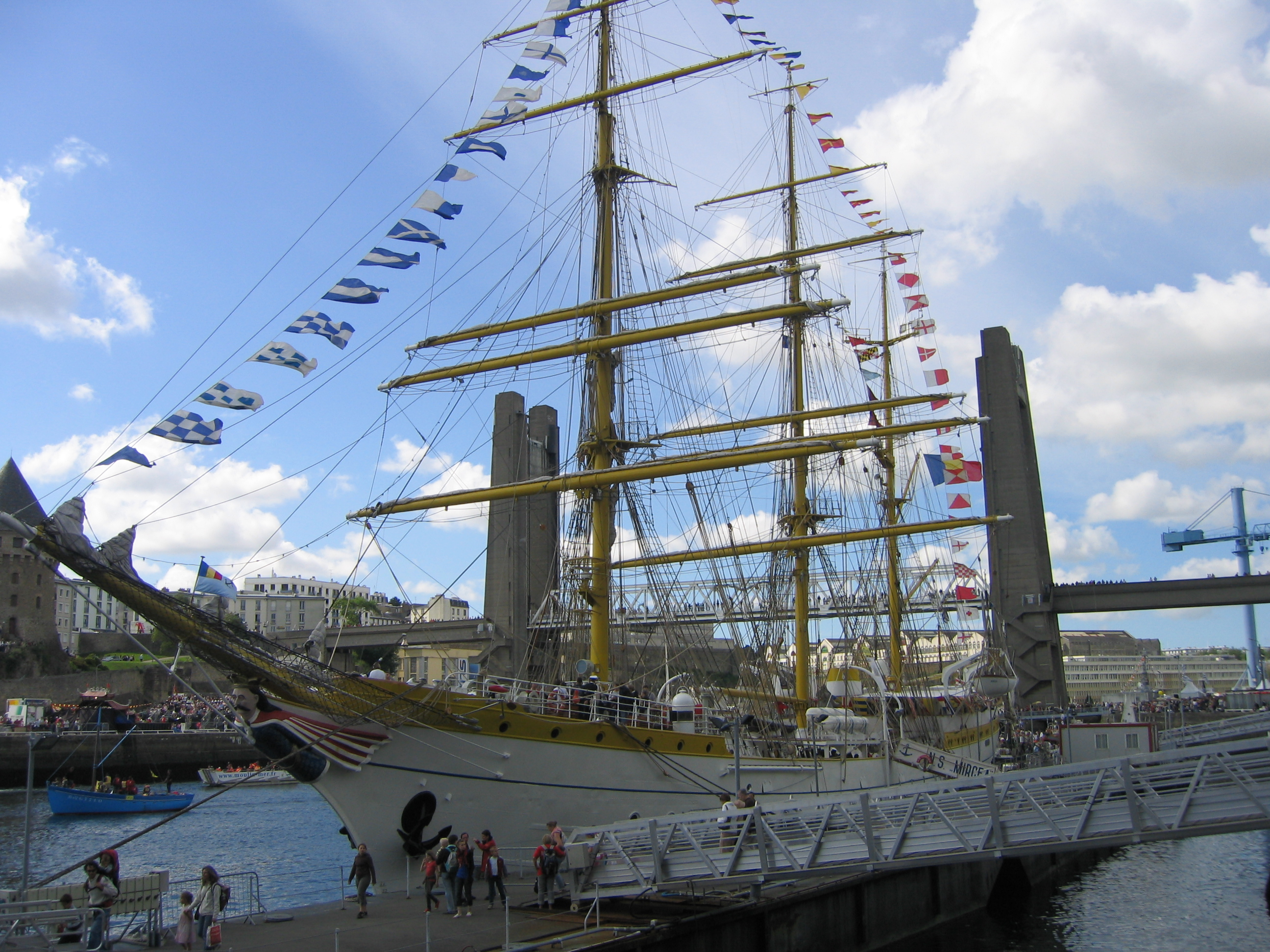
Mircea in front of the Recouvrance bridge

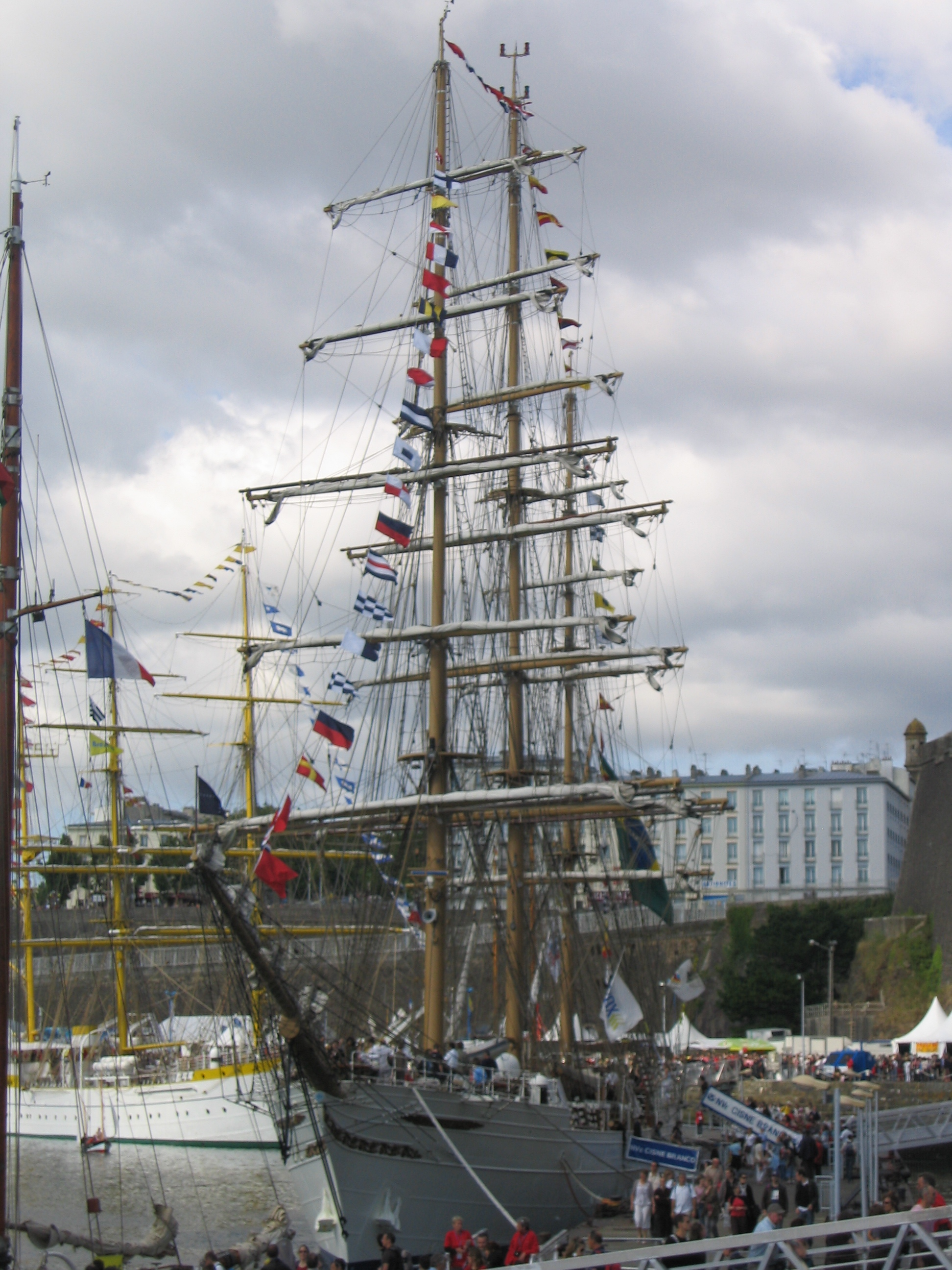
Cisne Branco

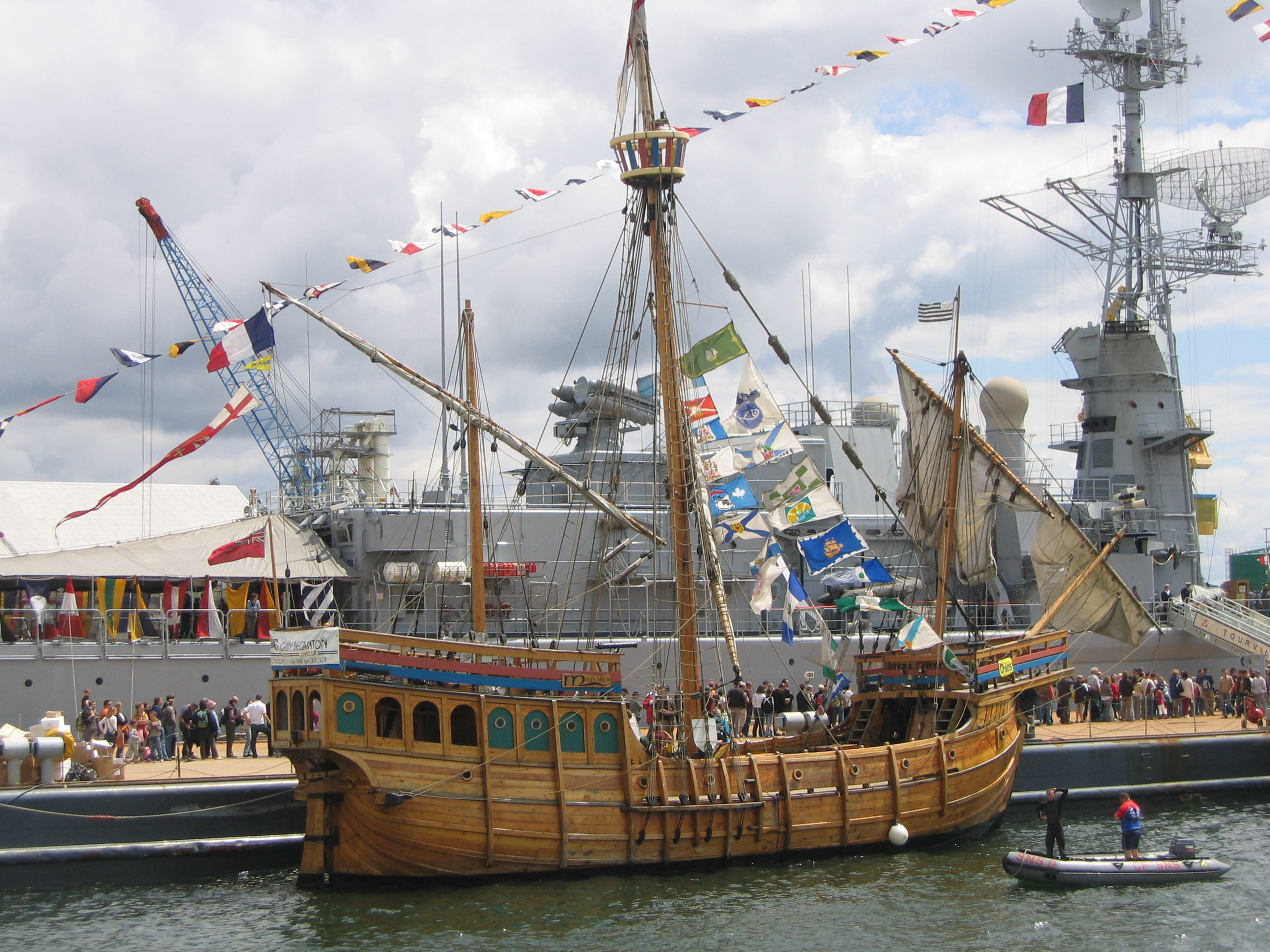
The Matthew, a replica of a 15th century ship.

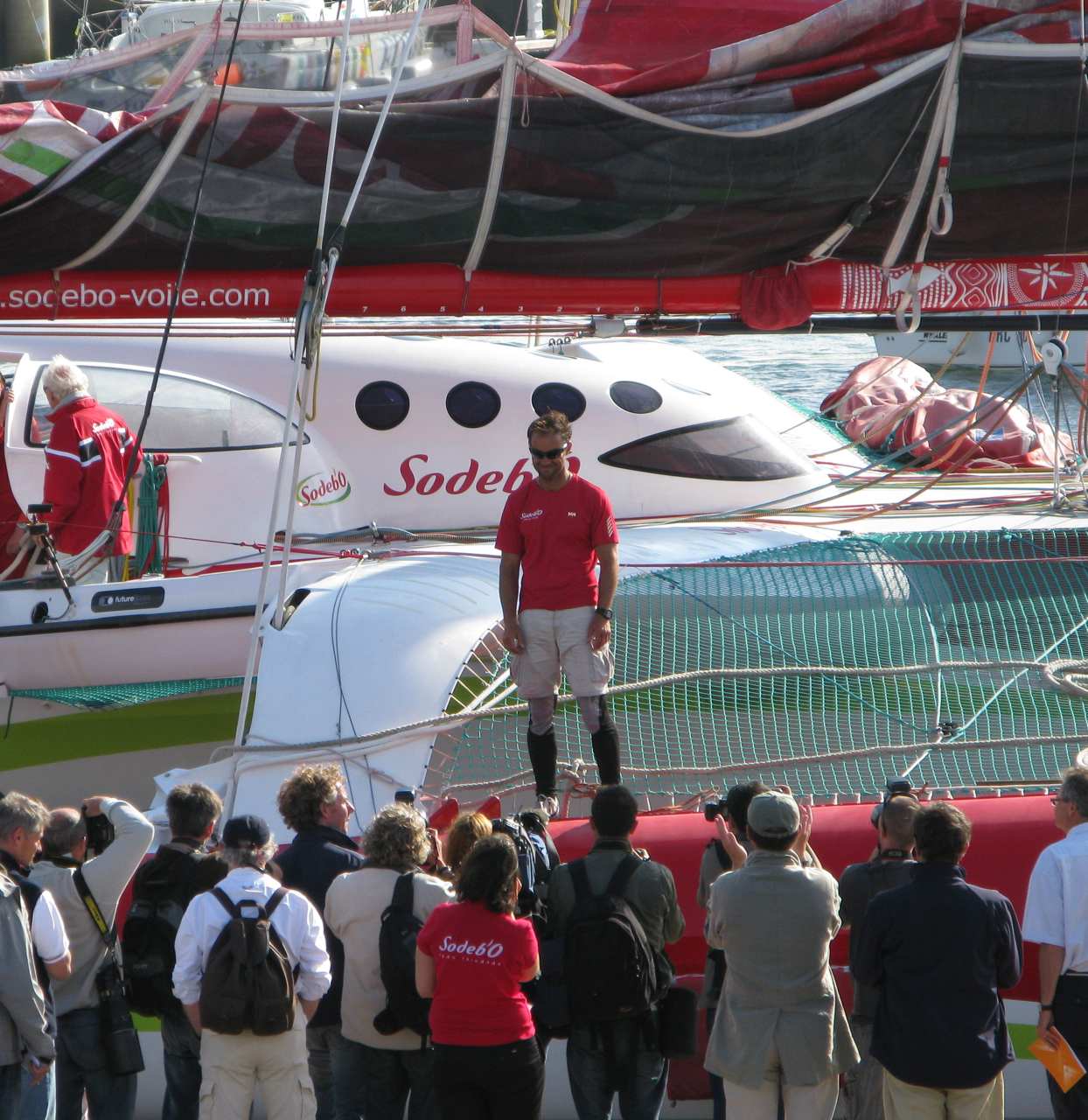
Thomas Coville on Sodeb'O

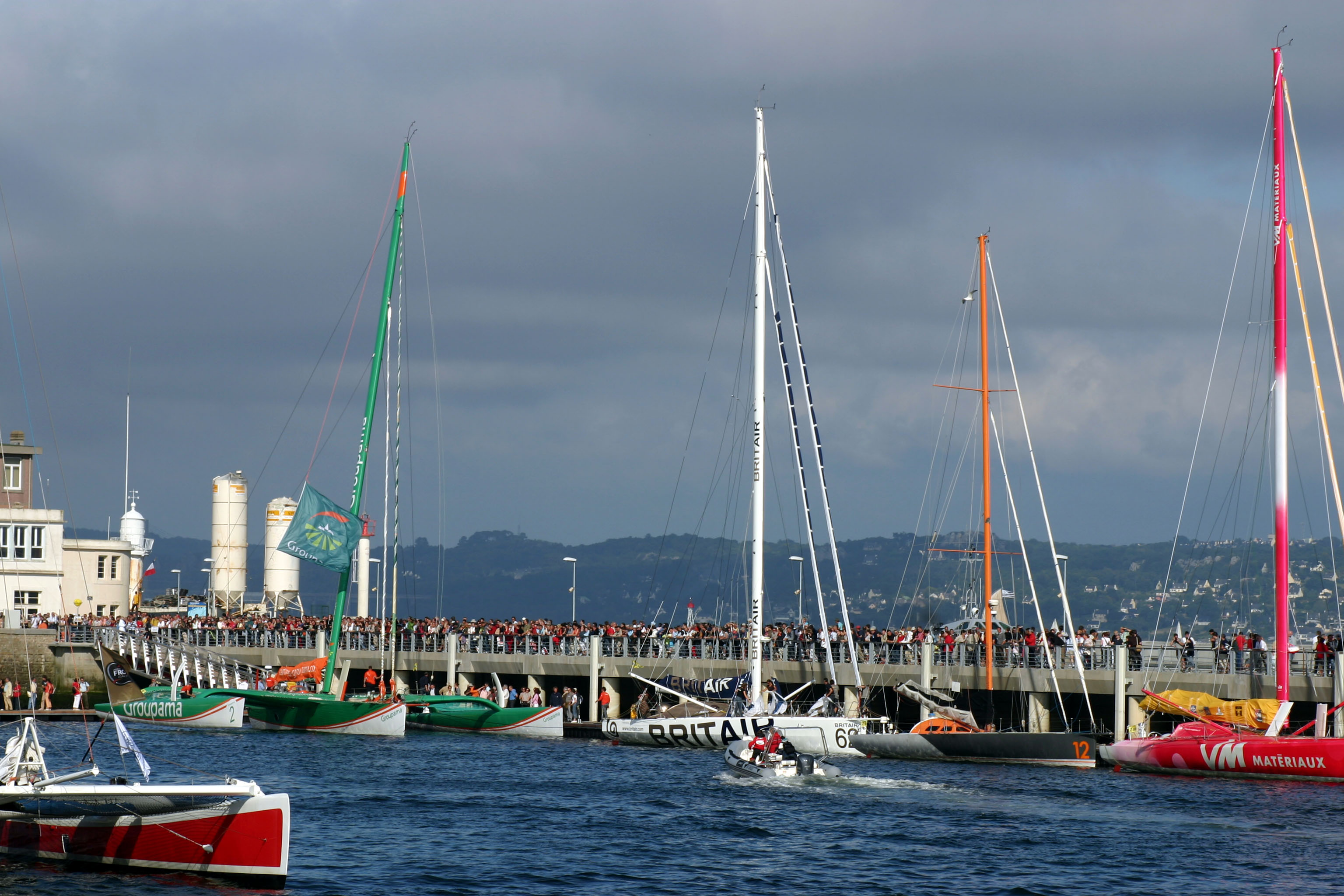
Groupama 2 and 60-foot IMOCA yachts

=== 2012 edition ===
The sixth edition, Les Tonnerres de Brest 2012, took place from July 13 to July 19, 2012. It also marked the 20th anniversary of this event.

=== 2016 edition ===
The seventh edition took place from July 13 to July 19, 2016. It brought together 712,000 visitors, 1,050 boats and 9,000 sailors.

=== 2020 edition ===
The 2020 Brest International Maritime Festival was to take place from July 10 to July 16, 2020. This edition was postponed due to the COVID-19 pandemic. The board of directors of Brest Evénements Nautiques association, decided on November 5, 2020 that the Brest maritime festivals will not take place in 2021, but in July 2022, before postponing them to 2024 in February 2021.

=== 2024 edition ===
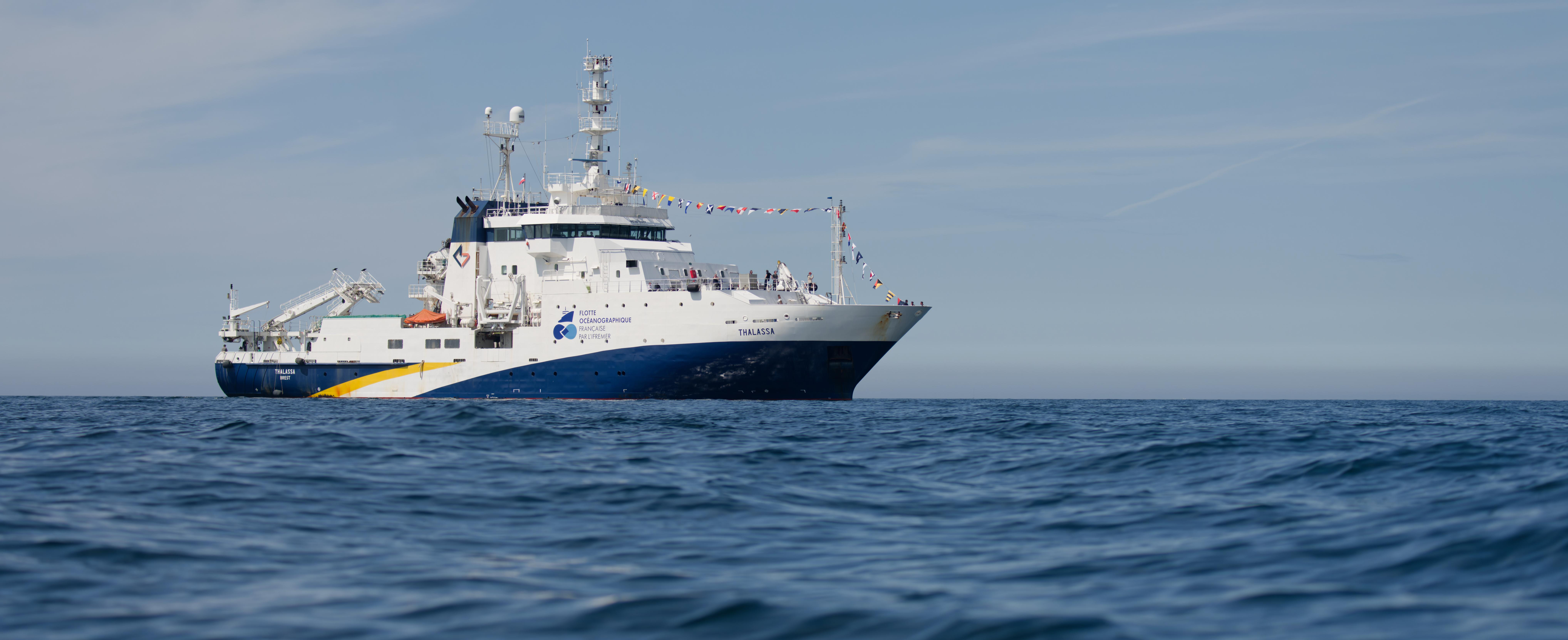
The Thalassa during the Brest International Maritime Festival 2024

The eighth edition, Brest 2024, took place from July 12 to July 17, 2024. It brought together 500,000 visitors and 627 boats from different nations.

== See also ==
- Tall Ships Races,
- SAIL Amsterdam, Netherlands,
