= Ivlia (ship) =

Full-sized reconstruction of an ancient bireme

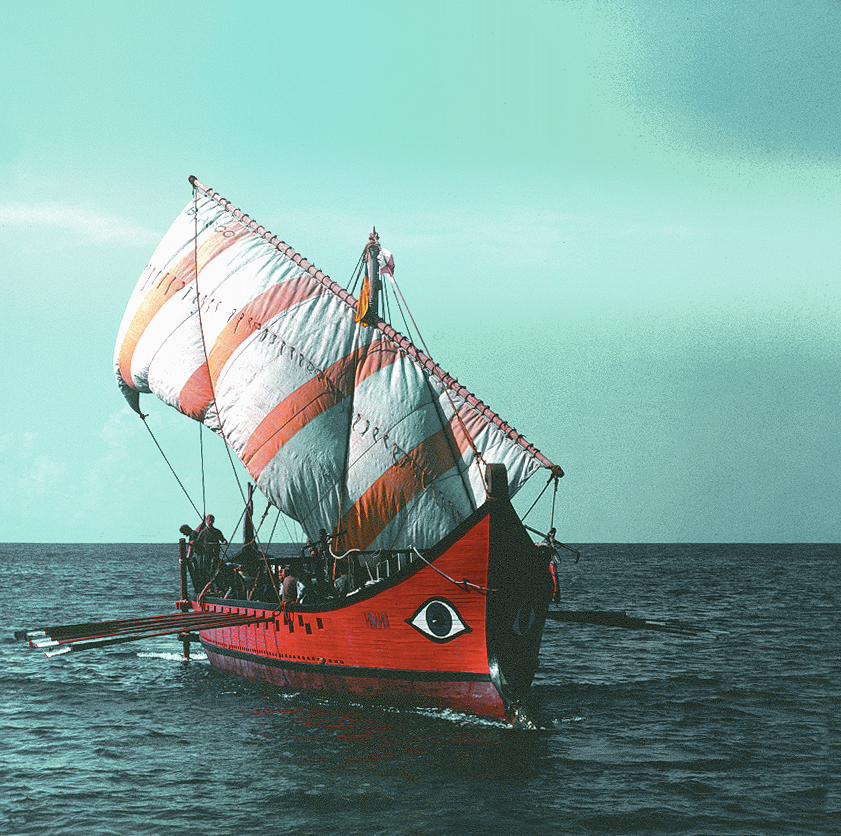
- Ivlia in Bay of Biscay

History

Soviet Union/Ukraine
- Name: Ivlia
- Laid down: September 1988
- Launched: August 1989
- Sponsored by: Black Sea Shipping Company
- Maiden voyage: 1989
- Home port: Odesa 46°28′N 30°44′E

General characteristics
- Type: bireme
- Displacement: 26 tonnes
- Length: 25.4 m (83 ft 4 in)
- Beam: 4.6 m (15 ft 1 in)
- Draught: 0.8 m (2 ft 7 in)
- Propulsion: Square sail, 55 sq.m, or 50 oarsmen
- Speed: Oars 5 knots (9.3 km/h) Sail 8 knots (15 km/h)
- Crew: 50 oarsmen and 5 officers

Ivlia (bireme) is a modern reconstruction of an ancient Greek rowing warship (galley) with oars at two levels, and is an example of experimental archaeology. Between 1989 and 1994, this vessel undertook six international historical and geographical expeditions, tracing the route of the ancient seafarers.

== Ship construction ==
After processing the available scientific data using ancient illustrations on vases and reliefs, as well as written and archaeological sources, members of the Odesa Archeological Museum, under the direction of Prof. Vladimir N. Stanko, Ph.D., proposed the building of a bireme because, in antiquity, it had been the most widely used vessel in the northern Black Sea region.

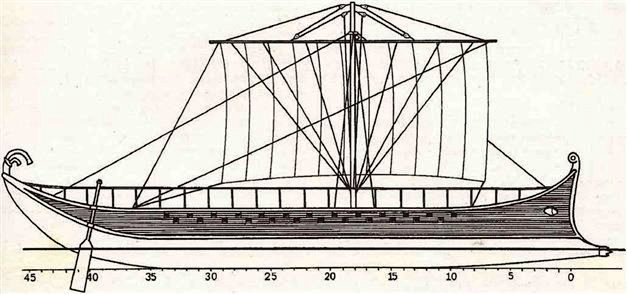

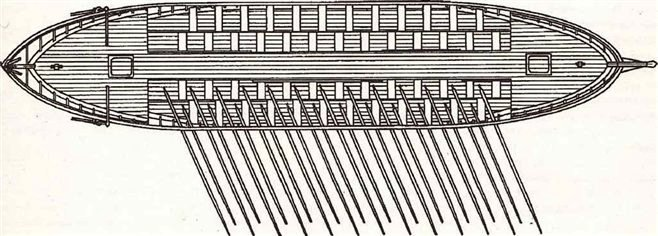

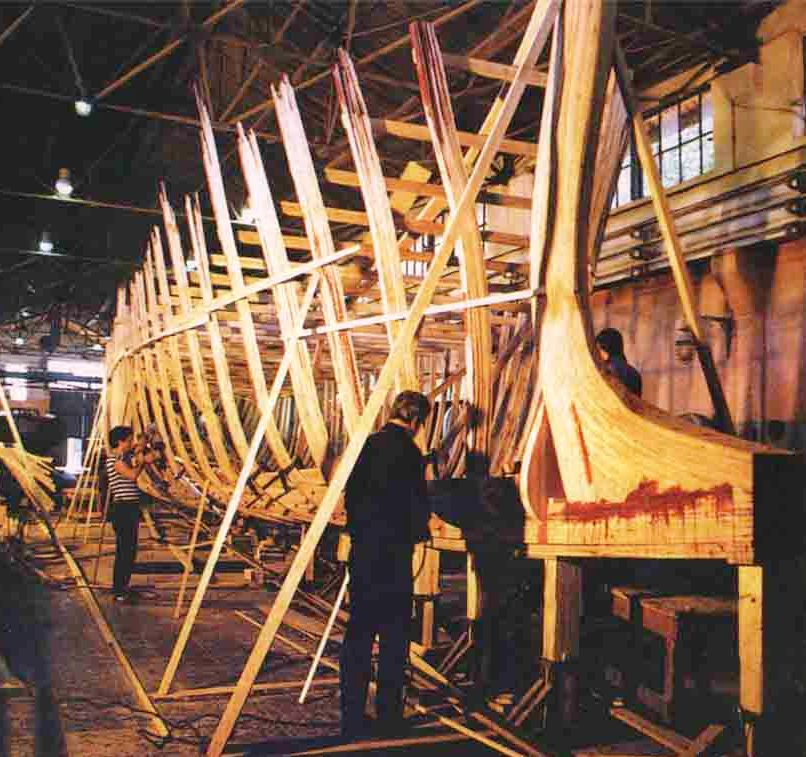
Construction of the ship

The ship was constructed in 1989 at the Sochi Naval Shipyard by a team led by shipwright Damir S. Shkhalakhov. Ivlia was built from Durmast oak and Siberian larch, while the oars were made of beech. The technical design of the project was carried out by specialists of the Nikolayev University of Shipbuilding. The main sponsor of the construction of the ship was the Black Sea Shipping Company.

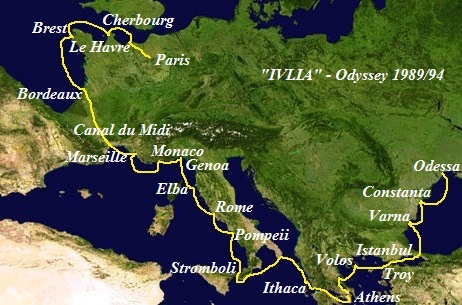
Route of the expeditions 1989-94

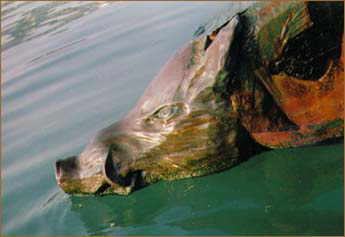
Ivlia’s bronze bow ram in form of wild boar's head

== Expedition route ==
Starting from Odesa in Ukraine in 1989, Ivlia followed the routes of the ancient mariners on the Black Sea and the Mediterranean Sea as well as the Atlantic Ocean, covering more than 3,000 nautical miles in six expedition seasons and visiting over 50 European ports, finally sailing up the river Seine to reach Paris. The Mayor of Paris, Jacques Chirac, was received on board the Ivlia. The ship was visited by official delegations and open to tourists. Ivlia also took part in international maritime festivals: Colombo'92 in Genoa (Italy), Brest’92, Cancal’93, and Vieux Greements’94 (France). Over six seasons the crew members included more than 200 people – citizens of Russia, Ukraine, Moldova, France, Greece and Georgia. In the end the ship was stored in maritime museum in La Rochelle, but was destroyed in fire.

== Scientific aspects ==
The authors of the project, Igor Melnik, Mikhail Agbunov and Pavel Goncharuk, together with the staff of the Odesa Archaeological Museum and the Nikolayev University of Shipbuilding, developed the research program of the expedition primarily to address the following objectives:

- Clarification of written and archaeological sources of data on the design, construction technology, and load capacity of ancient Greek ships.
- Practical research into the seaworthiness of antique biremes. The bireme performed well, even with tailwinds of up to 7 on the Beaufort scale.
- Verification of cabotage routes of Hellenic sailors, as well as the possibility of galleys in antiquity making voyages on the open sea, out of sight of the coast. In the scientific world, there is continuing debate about how far the routes of ancient mariners were from the coastline. Many scholars believe that ancient seagoing ships were weak, and consequently, their pilots kept close to the shores. However, a coast that was unlit and unequipped with navigation marks, as it was in ancient times, posed far more perils for navigation than the open sea. To this must be added the threat of pirate attacks, since many of the coastal peoples engaged in brigandage.
- Clarifying the details of ancient periplus and verifying a range of hypotheses from the project authors to localize the ancient Greek settlement of the North-Western Black Sea region.
- Mastering the ancient art of navigation, control of an antique vessel by sail, and methods of mooring and anchoring galleys.

Ancient galleys had an emotive aspect that seems to attach itself to most of the great ship designs of history. Their hulls were waterproofed by painting them with pitch. The ram was often sheathed in bronze and decorated with multiple dagger designs or shaped like the snout of a gigantic boar.

The practical experience gained on Ivlia's expeditions enabled the project authors to affirm:

- The level of cartographical advancement and navigational knowledge of the ancient Greeks and the seaworthiness of their ships were likely higher than is commonly believed.
- Ancient mariners were likely able to navigate by the stars, make open sea crossings, were capable of sailing away from the coast, were familiar with and used the prevailing winds and currents.
- The famous triremes, which were distinguished by their performance in combat, were less seaworthy than the biremes: they were built for battle and used in large naval campaigns.

If the role of the ship was to manoeuvre so as to ram an opposing ship most effectively, the advantage of a doubled oar crew is more than doubtful. The increase in power would not compensate for the additional weight of structure and men. To judge from the surviving pictures of two-level galleys from the sixth century BC, the new system seems to have been used to reduce the ship's length while keeping the same number of oarsmen.

- Biremes were the most common type of vessel used during the great Greek colonization of the Mediterranean. The geographical discoveries of antiquity were made on these vessels, suited as they were to long ocean voyages. As the most seaworthy ships of the time, it is likely that biremes were used by the Carthaginian explorers Himilco and Hanno for explorations beyond the Pillars of Hercules, as well as Pytheas of Massalia's voyage to the legendary island of Thule.

In addition, the research program conducted on board Ivlia included the participation of the Institute of Biology of the Southern Seas. In accordance with the research program, developed under the leadership of the Acad. Y. P. Zaitsev. During the expedition, density, salinity, transparency and contamination of seawater were regularly measured. Also, regular measurements were made of environmental parameters and the level of pollution of the seawater, assessments of the state of marine flora and fauna, and a variety of medical experiments were conducted. The data obtained during the six years of voyages are summarized in the articles and books subsequently published by the authors of the project.

== Gallery ==
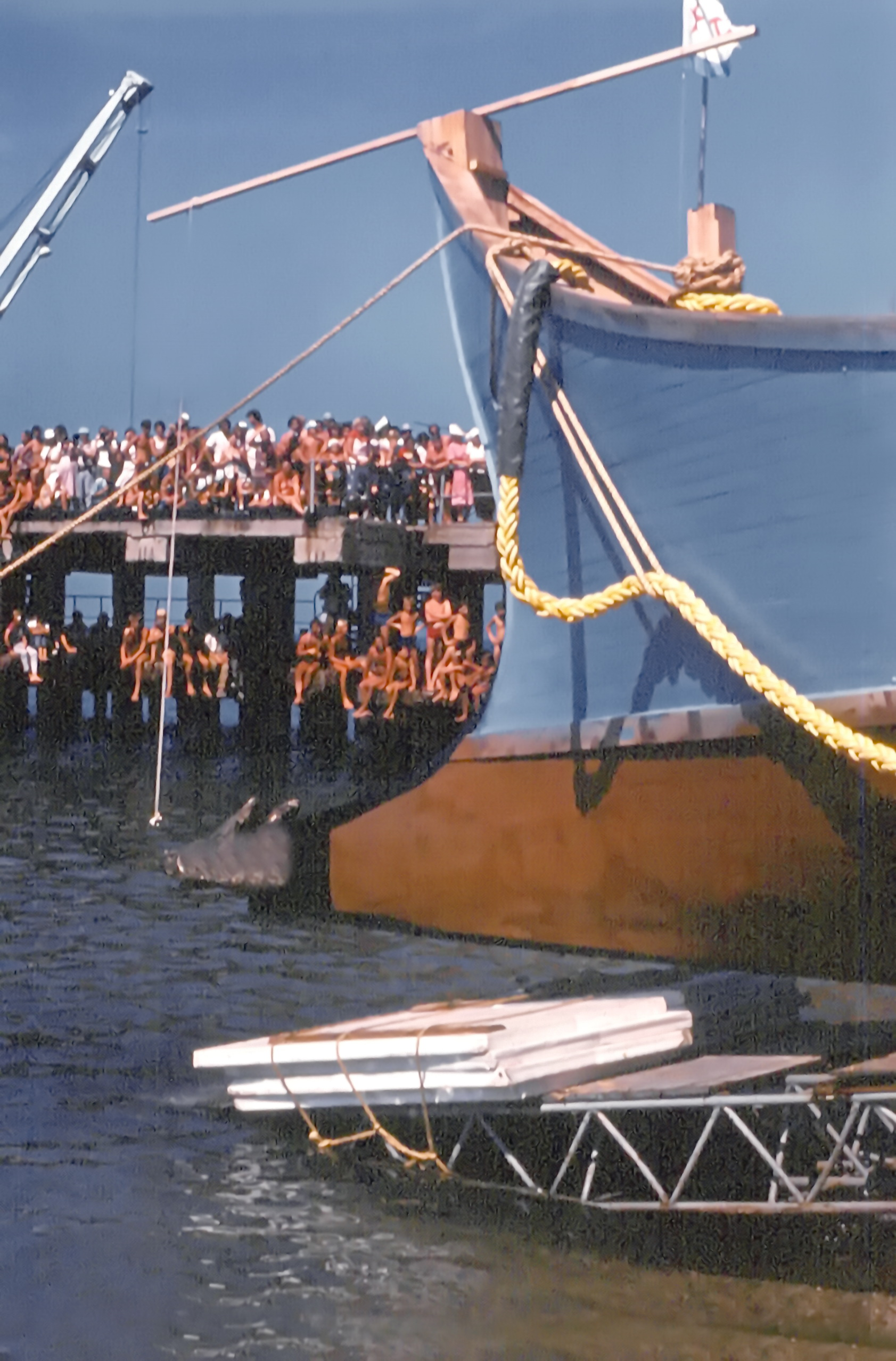
Launching of bireme Ivlia

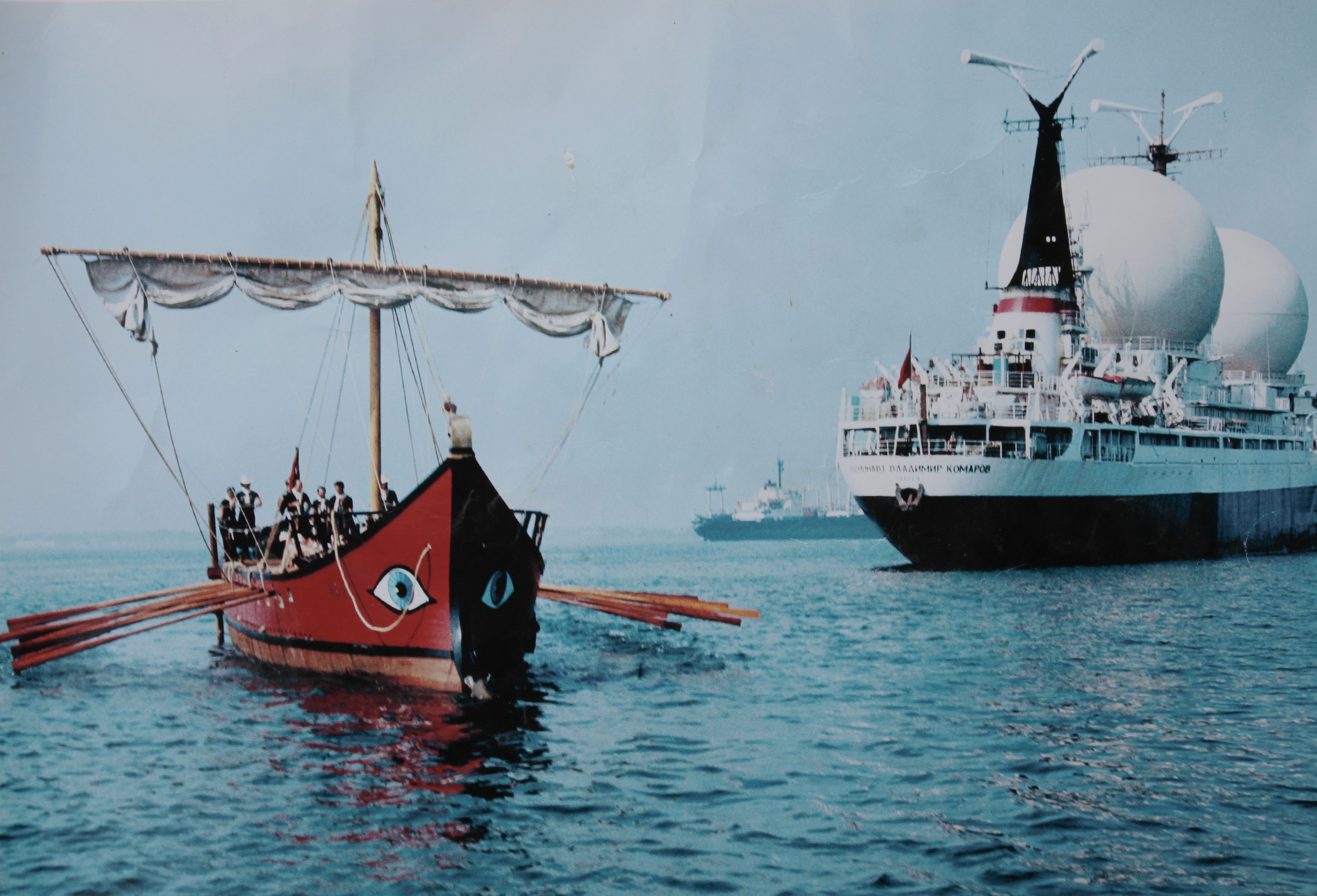
Ivlia and the research vessel - Kosmonavt Vladimir Komarov.

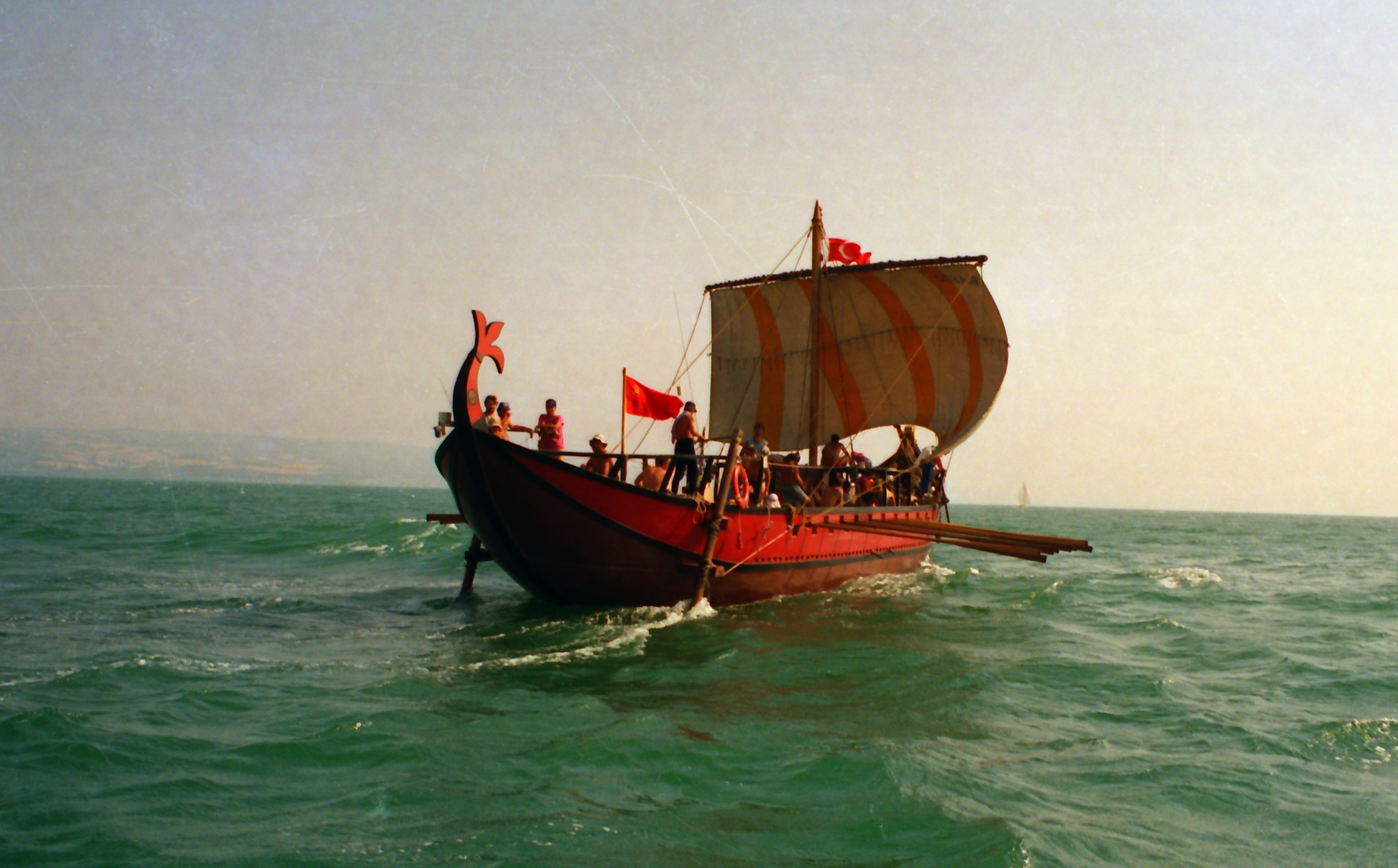
Ivlia in the Strait Dardanelles

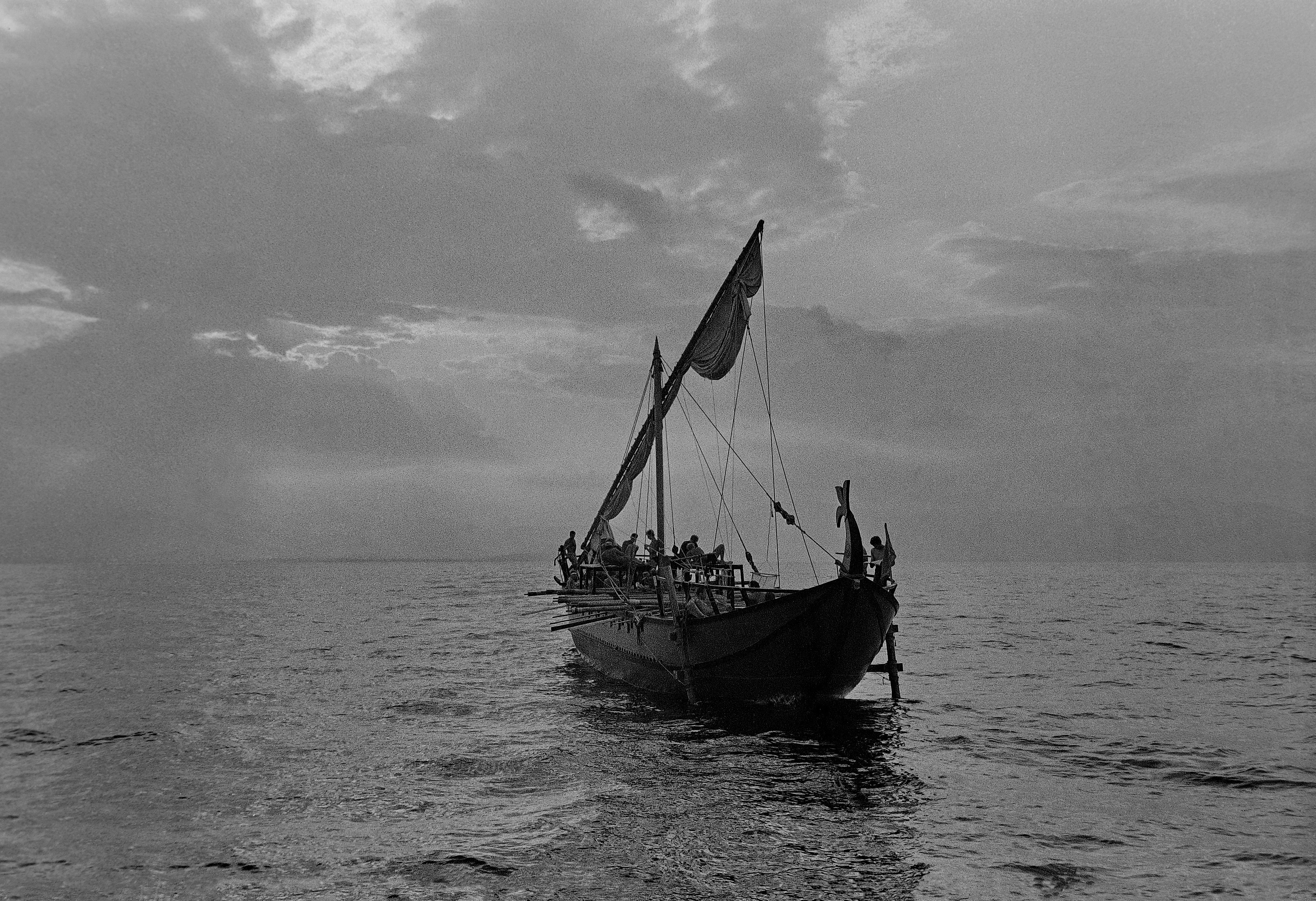
Calm in Gulf of Naples.

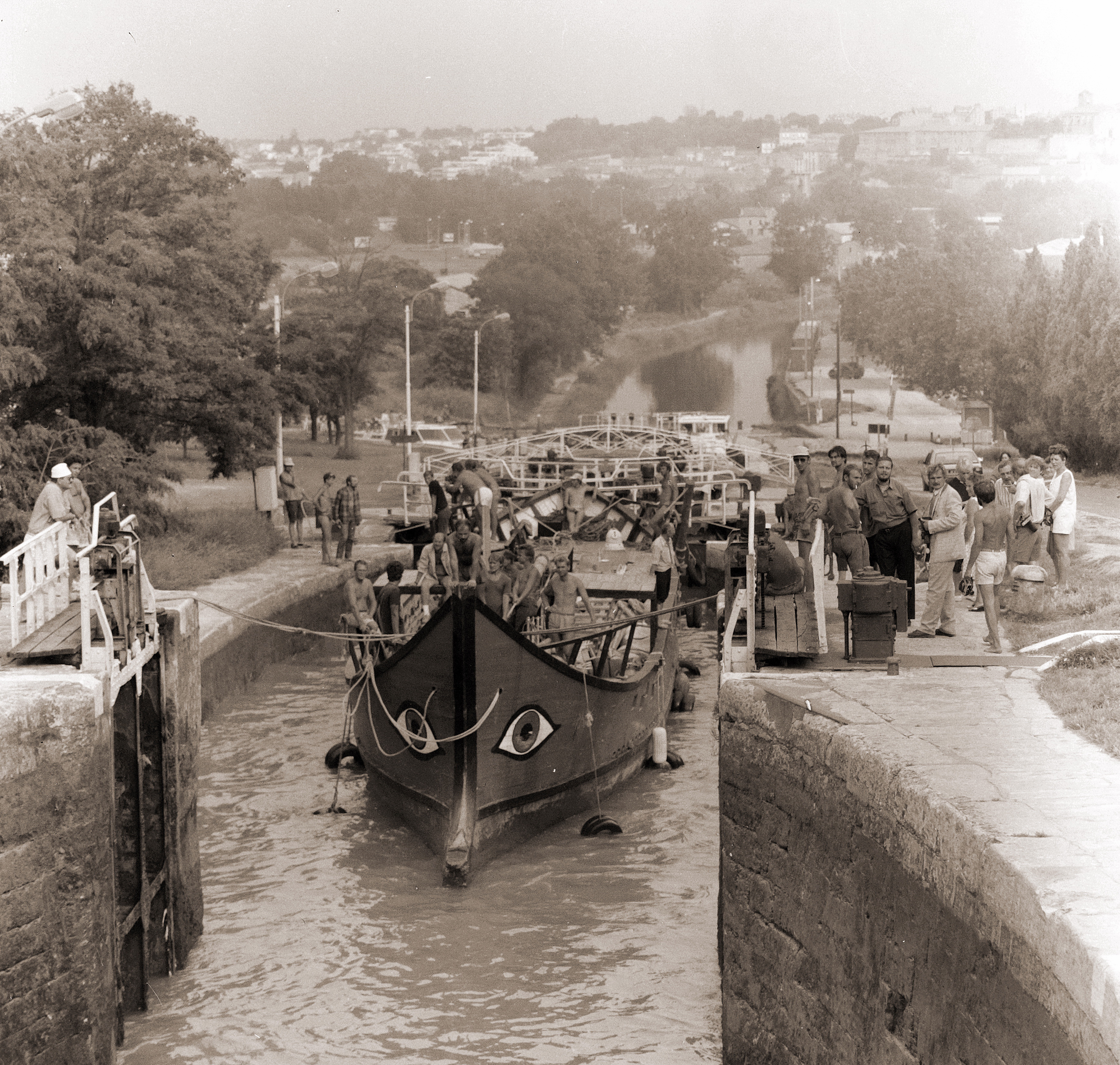
Ivlia at the exit from Fonserannes locks.

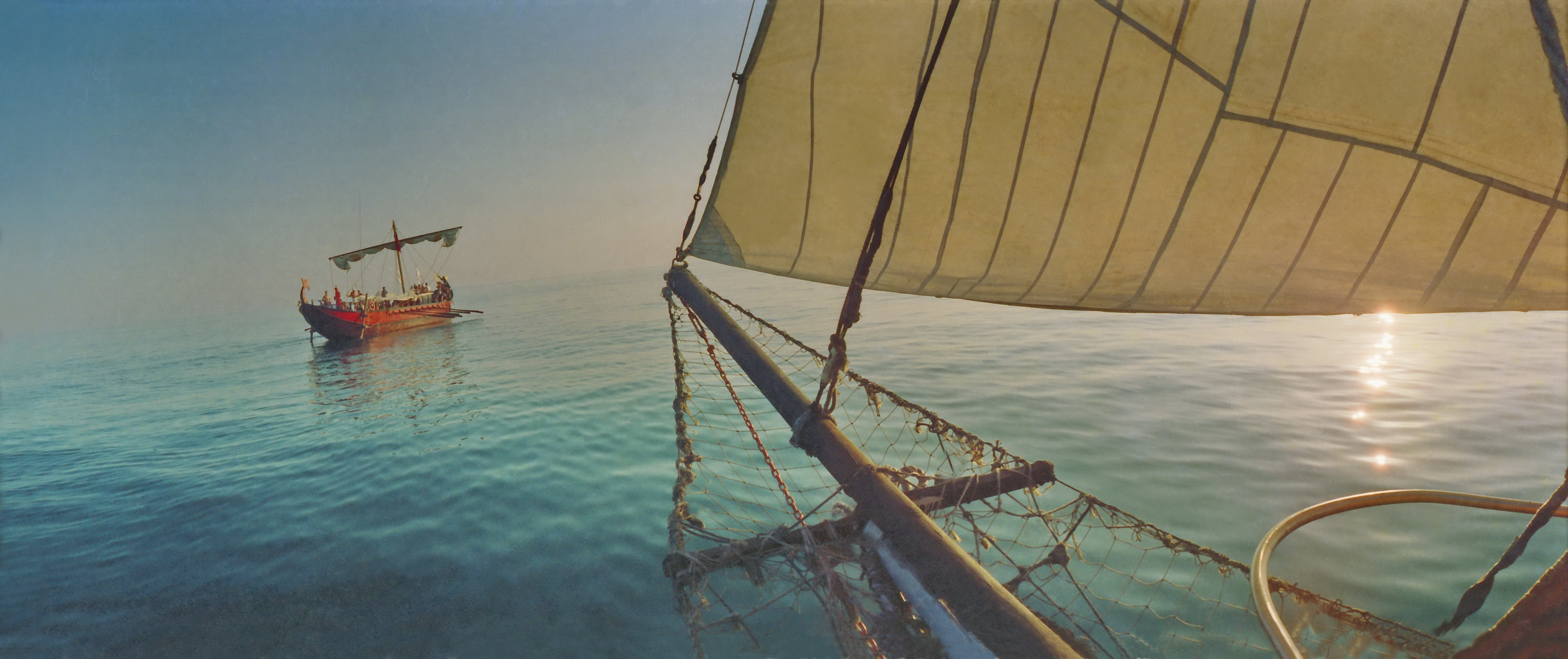
Ivlia and the escort yacht - Yuri Gagarin.

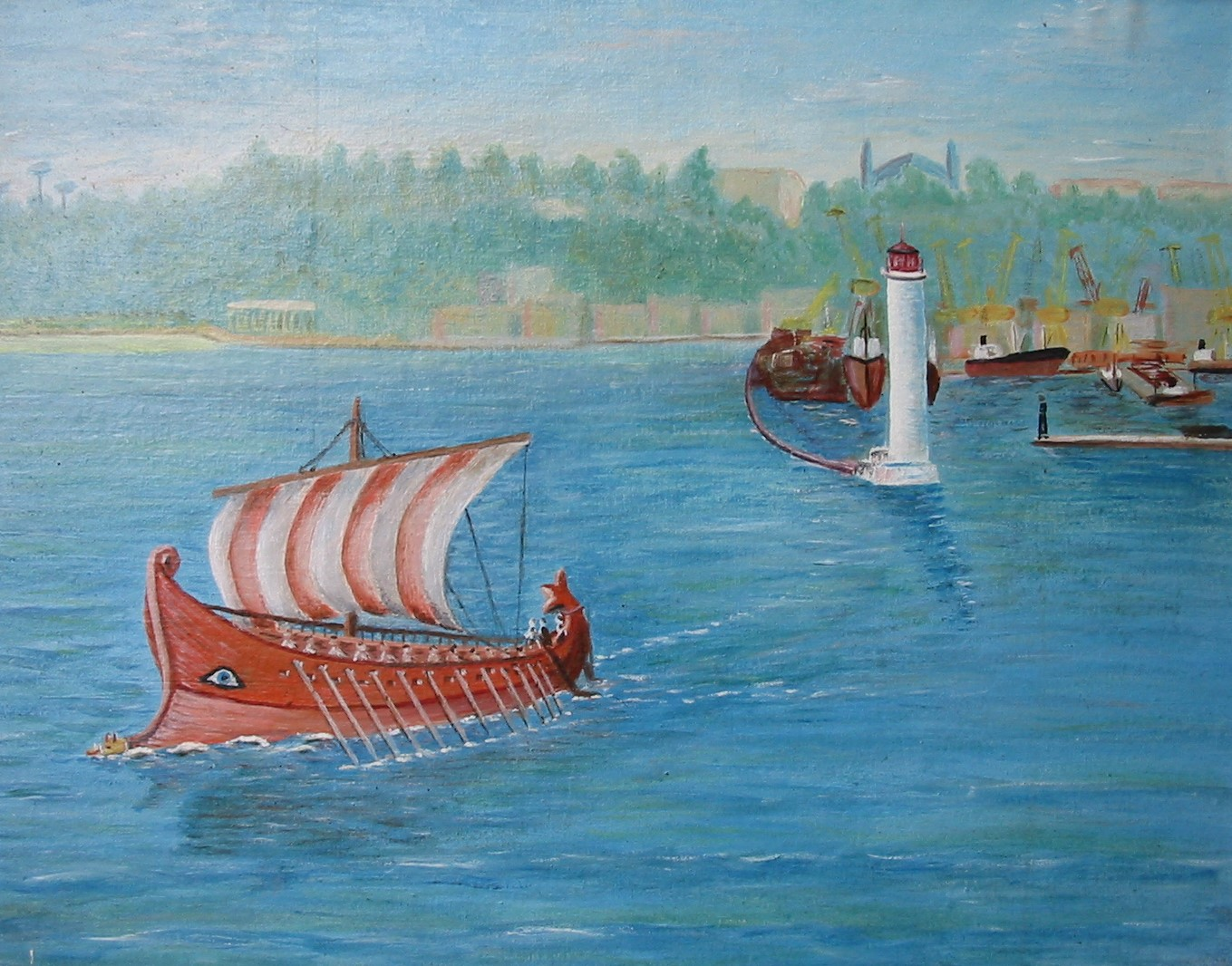
Ivlia leaves port of Odesa.

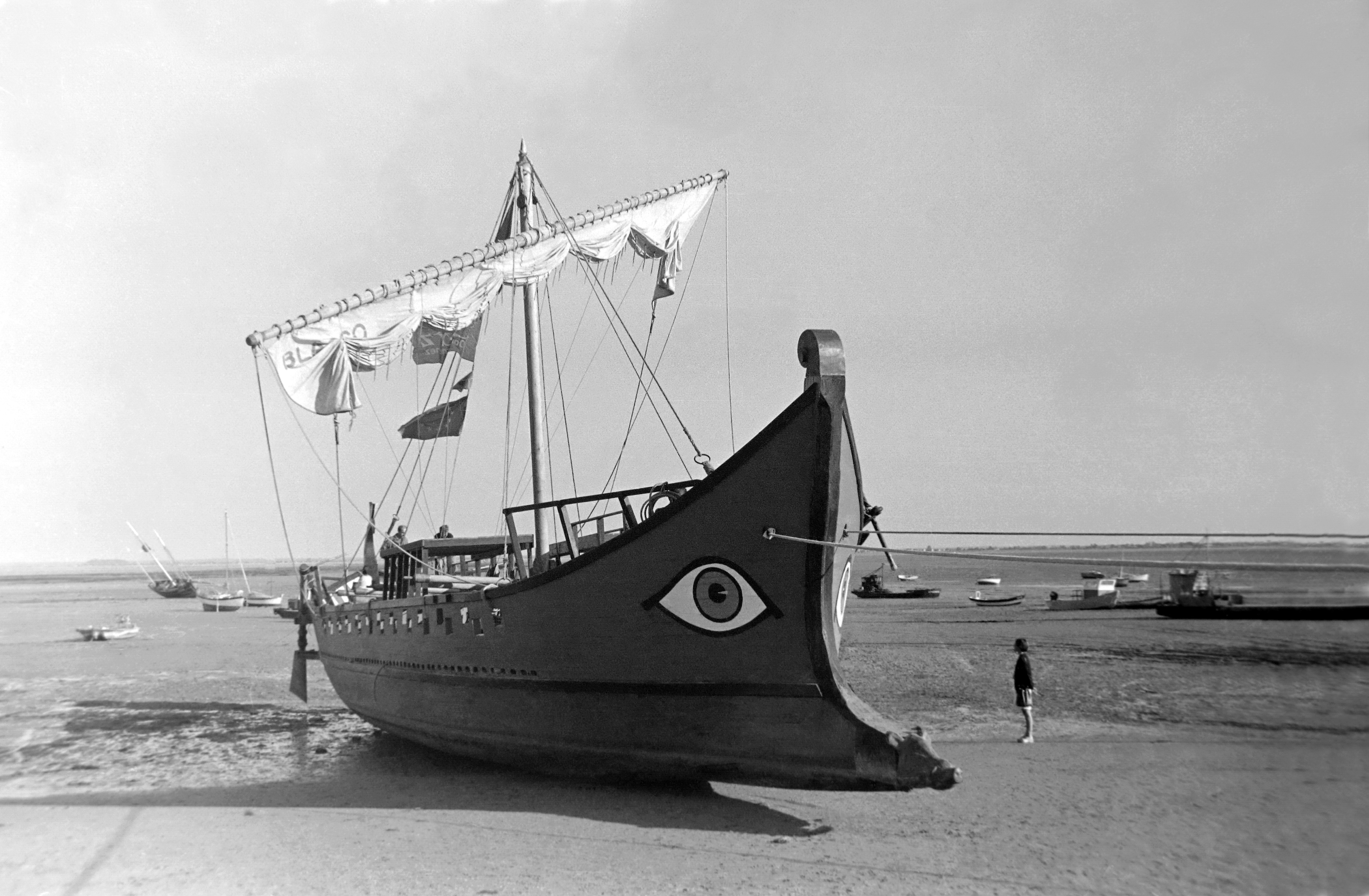
Ivlia in Cancale.

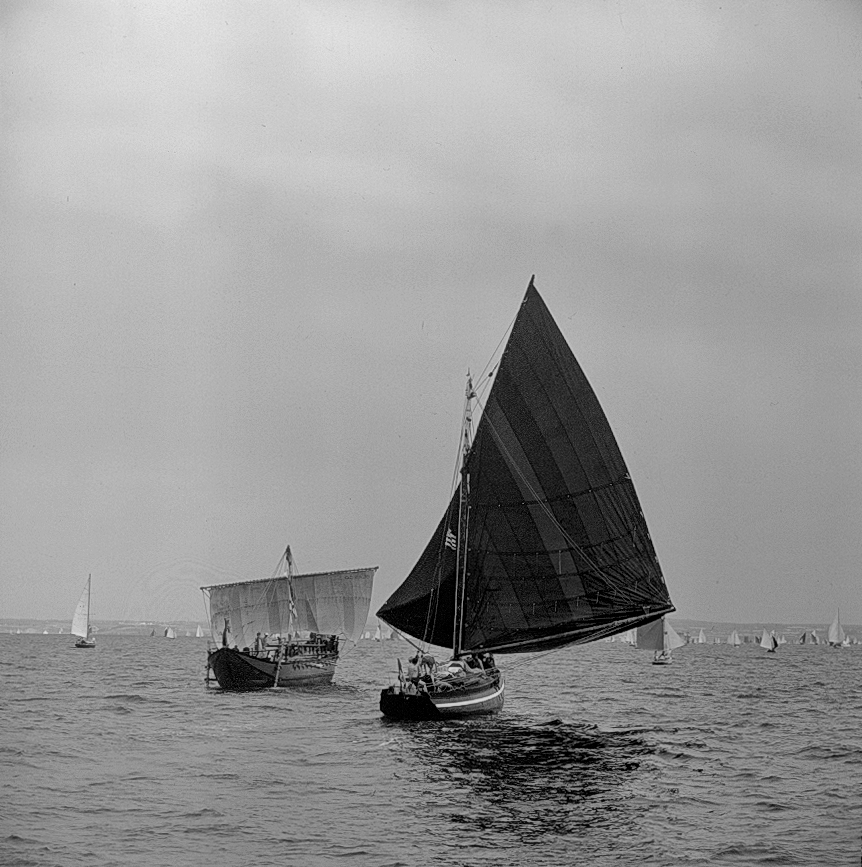
The culmination of the famous maritime festival Brest'92 is the transition of all boats to the port of Douarnenez. Parade of participants.

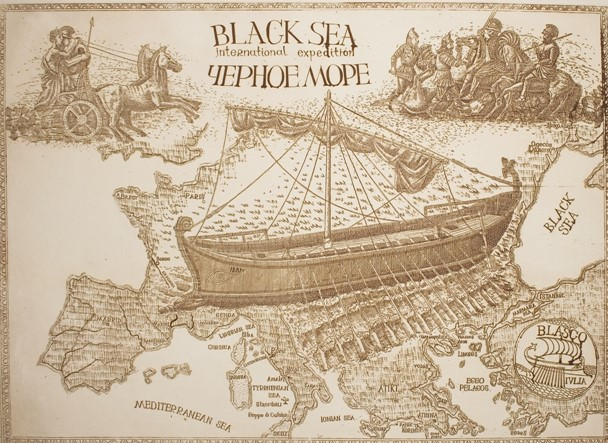
Etching "Black Sea" Expedition, author Vladimir Bakhtov, 1989.

== Literature ==
- Bockius, Ronald (2007). Schifffahrt und Schiffbau in der Antike, p. 52-64. Theiss Verlag. ISBN 978-3-8062-1971-5
- Casson, Lionel (1991). The Ancient Mariners, ch.8. Princeton University Press. ISBN 0-691-06836-4
- Gilles, Daniel (1992). L'Album Souvenir de la Fete Brest'92, p. 7, 111, 236, 257. Le Chasse Maree. Armen. ISBN 2-903708-37-1
- Mark, Samuel (2005). Homeric Seafaring. Texas University Press. ISBN 1-58544-391-3
- Melnik, Igor K. (2010). Historical Maritime Sailing in Models & Reconstruktions, p. 46-49. Kyiv, Phoenix. ISBN 978-966-438-278-3
- Morrison, John. The Athenian Trireme, pp. 28–30. Cambridge University Press. ISBN 0-521-56419-0
- "Il Secolo XIX", (Italy), 23.05.1992. "In porto, dopo 3 anni d'odissea, una triremi russa", Giorgio Carrozi.
- "La Stampa", (Italy), 31.05.1992 (№147). "E'approdata a Sanremo la triremi dell'antica Grecia".
- "Il Tirreno", (Italy), 06.05.1992. " Una mostra per l’Ivlia".
- "Le Monde", (France), 19.07.1992. "Pavel, galerien d'Odessa", Annick Cojean.
- "Revue Thalassa", (France), 07.1992 (№3). "Et vogue la galere" p. 64-65.
- "Presse – Ocean (Ouest)", (France), 09.09.1994. "Ivlia se prepare pour une transatlantique", Severine Le Bourhis, p. 15.
- "Le Télégramme", (France), 02.08.1994. "La galere antique a la conquete de l’Atlantique", Noel Pochet.
- "La Presse de la Manche", (France), 14.08.1993. " Et vogue la galere ukrainienne", Th. Motte, p. 3-4.
- "Le Chasse Maree", (France), 07.1992 (№67). "Ivlia, la galere", p. 16.
- "Le Marin", (France), 21.05.1993. "Sous le vent de la galere", Cristhine Le Portal.
- "Le Parisien", (edition Paris), 16.09.1993. "Une galere antique", Laurent Mauron.
- "Libération", (France), 07.12.1993. "Ivlia ou l'Odyssee suspendue", Patrick Le Roux, p. 28-29.
