= Celox (boat) =

5th-1st century BC Greek warship

The Celox or Celes (Ancient Greek: κέλης, κελήτιον), was a type of swift boat used in ancient Greek naval warfare and various official functions. The boat is said to have been invented by the Rhodians and was notable for its speed and agility. The Celox was primarily used by pirates but also played a significant role as an attendant vessel to larger fleets, for delivering messages, or negotiating with the enemy. It seems that it was used between fifth and first centuries BC.

== Etymology and Terminology ==
The term is derived from the verb κέλλω ("to urge on"), which reflects the boat's primary characteristic of speed. Additionally, the word κέλης meant "race-horse," further emphasizing the vessel's swift nature, highlighting the boat's resemblance to a fast and agile animal.

== Design and Construction ==
The Celox was a small, narrow boat designed for rapid movement. It lacked a deck and typically featured a single bench of oars, making it highly maneuverable. This construction enabled the boat to operate in close-quarters combat and swiftly navigate through waters. The boat was typically rowed by a small crew, with each oarsman likely handling two oars. The boat was often referred to as ὀξύ ("sharp" or "fast") by ancient sources, emphasizing its speed.

While some ancient sources suggest that the Celox may have resembled a bireme or trireme, it is more likely that these references describe the number of oarsmen on each side, rather than the number of rower benches. The Celox was typically manned by fewer than forty oarsmen, and its oar arrangement was distinct from larger ships, which had multiple benches of rowers.

The boat's design made it suitable for both fast pursuit and escape. It was operated entirely by oars, which allowed it to be independent of weather conditions and move with precision in various environments. The Celox was thus highly maneuverable, resembling modern gunboats in its tactical flexibility.

== Usage and Role ==
The Celox was frequently used in piracy, where its speed and maneuverability were invaluable for ambushing or escaping from larger ships. However, it also had important military and official roles. It was often employed as an attendant boat for larger fleets, used to bring news, deliver messages, or negotiate with enemies. Each Greek state likely maintained Celox boats for various official purposes, like the demosiakai akatoi (δημοσίαι ἄκατοι) in Athens.

The Celox was also noted for its resemblance to modern-day gunboats due to its tactical use in rapid deployment and strategic operations.

== Other variants ==
A related vessel, the epaktrokeles (ἐπακτροκέλης), had a somewhat rounder shape and was also used by pirates. It combined the features of a Celox with those of a transport vessel (ἐπακτρὶς), designed for carrying spoils while still maintaining a degree of speed and agility for pursuit or flight.
