= Caccamo (surname) =

Caccamo is an Italian surname. Notable people with the name include:

- Celso Álvarez Cáccamo (born 1958), Spanish author and sociolinguist
- Cristiano Caccamo (born 1989), Italian actor
- Giovanni Caccamo (born 1990), Italian singer-songwriter
- Patrizia Caccamo (born 1984), Italian footballer
