= La Recouvrance (schooner) =

La Recouvrance - Replica Schooner - France - Year: 1990

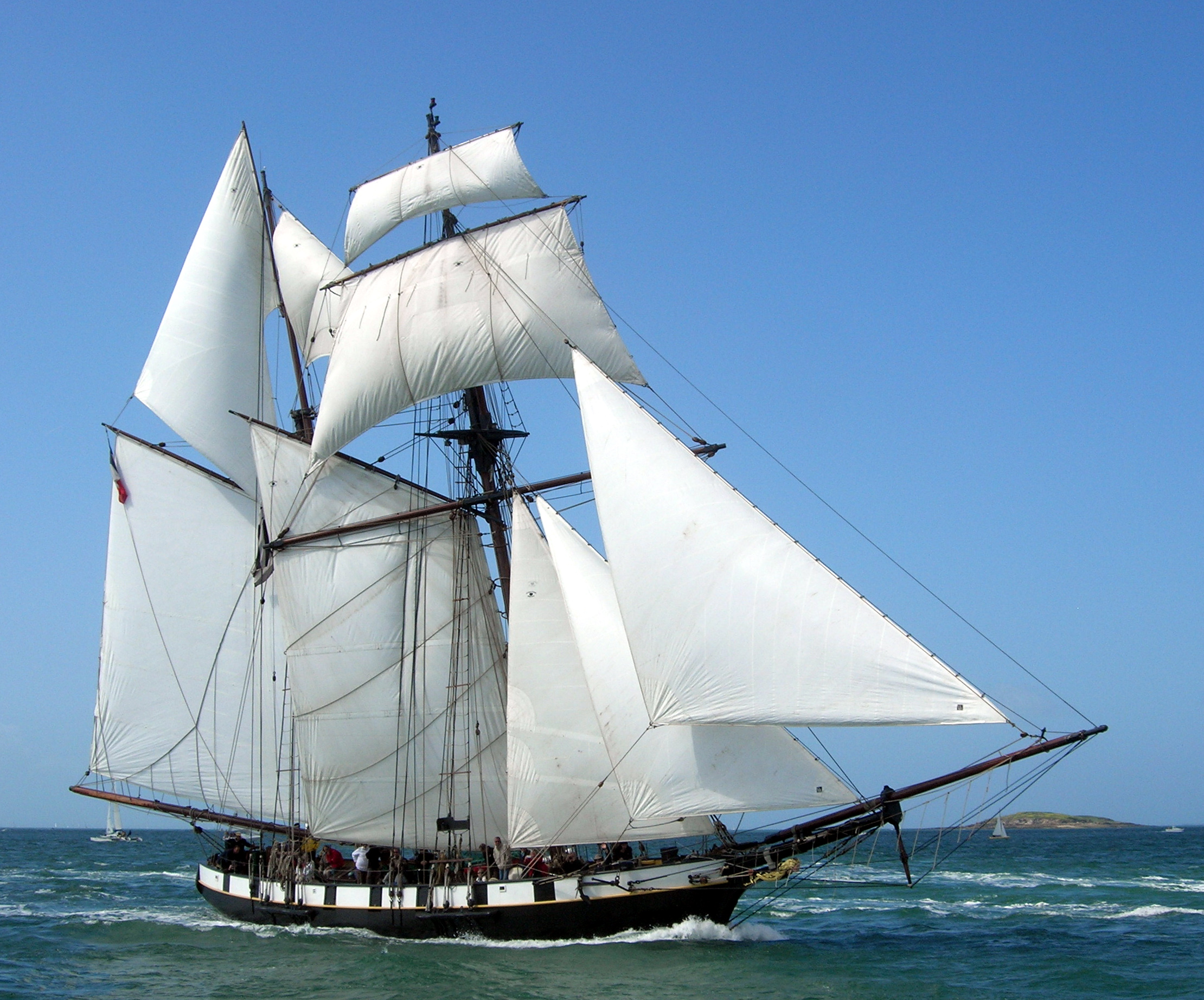
- La Recouvrance at the Semaine du Golfe du Morbihan festival

History

France
- Name: La Recouvrance
- Namesake: Recouvrance
- Owner: Goelette la Recouvrance
- Ordered: 1990
- Builder: Chantier du Guip
- Laid down: 11 July 1991
- Christened: 14 July 1992
- Completed: 1993
- Homeport: Brest, France
- Identification: MMSI number: 227306100; Callsign: FVXQ
- Fate: tourist vessel

General characteristics
- Displacement: 150 tonnes (170 short tons)
- Length: 25 m (82 ft), 42 m (138 ft) overall
- Beam: 6.4 m (21 ft)
- Height: 28 m (92 ft)
- Draft: 3.2 m (10 ft)
- Sail plan: Two-masted square-topsail schooner, 430 m^{2} (4,600 sq ft) total sail area
- Capacity: 30 persons
- Complement: 5: captain, mate, and 3 crew including cook

La Recouvrance is a replica gaff rigged schooner, named in honour of Recouvrance, one of the districts of Brest.

== History ==
The idea for La Recouvrance was originally conceived in 1990.

She was modeled on the plans for Iris, which was designed by the French naval engineer Hubert in 1817. Originally, there had been five vessels built from Iris design, and these ships were employed in the early nineteenth century as courier vessels for the Navy. Eventually, their role was expanded to include surveillance and protection of merchant shipping off the African and West Indian coasts.

The proposal for a replica vessel was taken up by several public and private interests in Brest, which formed Goelette la Recouvrance organisation to oversee the project. Construction on the ship began in 1991, and employed both volunteer and paid labour. The partially completed La Recouvrance was launched at the Brest '92 maritime festival, and her rig was completed a year later.

In 1996, management of the vessel was transferred to SOPAB Brest.

== Career ==
La Recouvrance sails regularly from Brest, offering day sails for up to 25 passengers and overnight sails for up to 12.

She occasionally attends maritime festivals, and has visited many European nations.

== Gallery ==
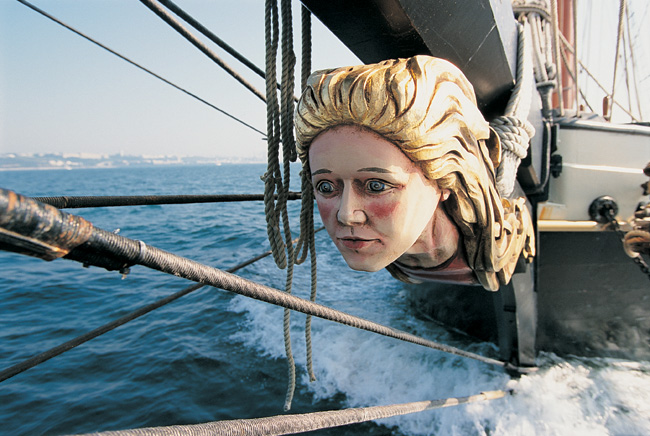
The figurehead of La Recouvrance

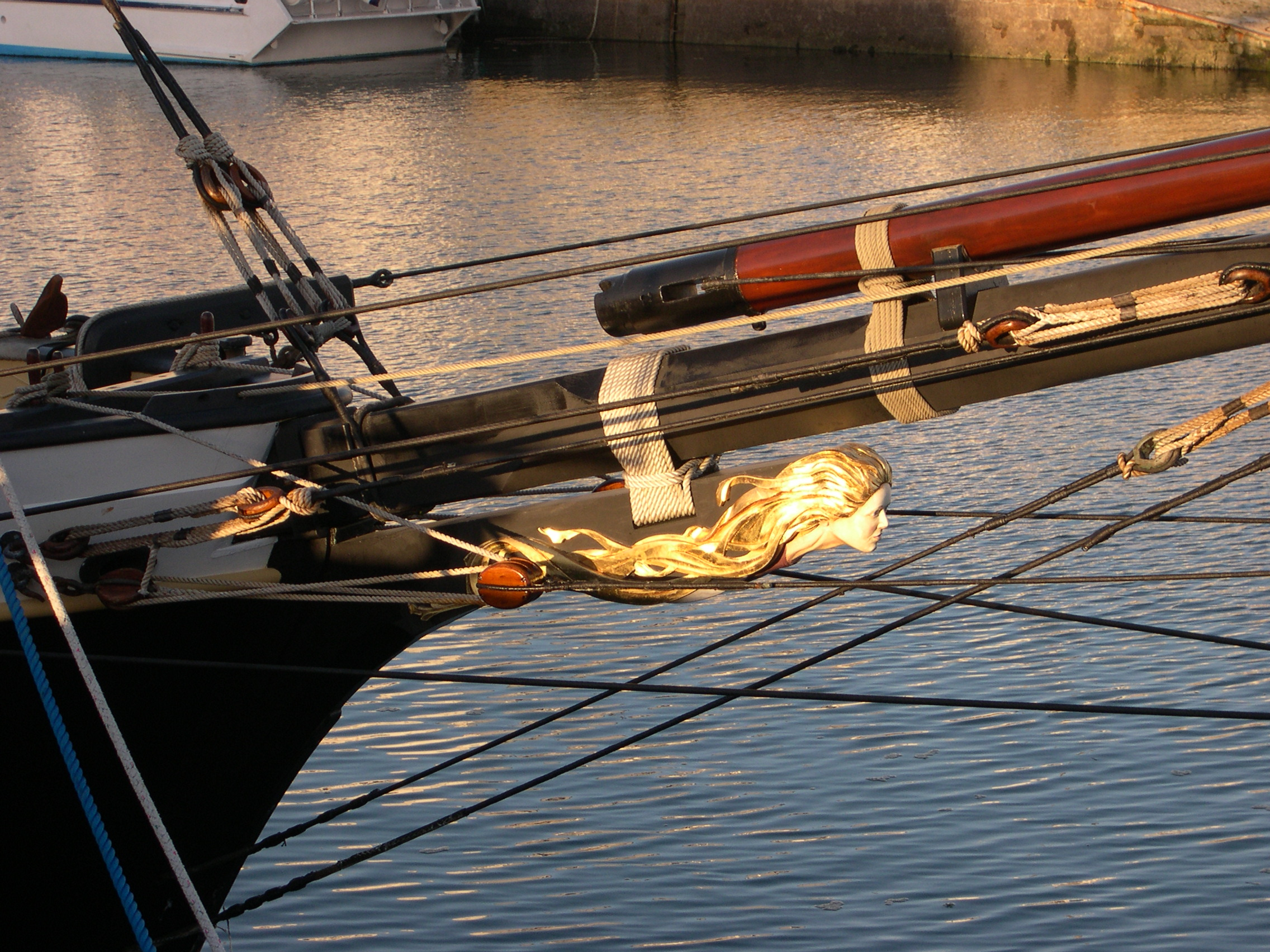
Figurehead and bowsprit

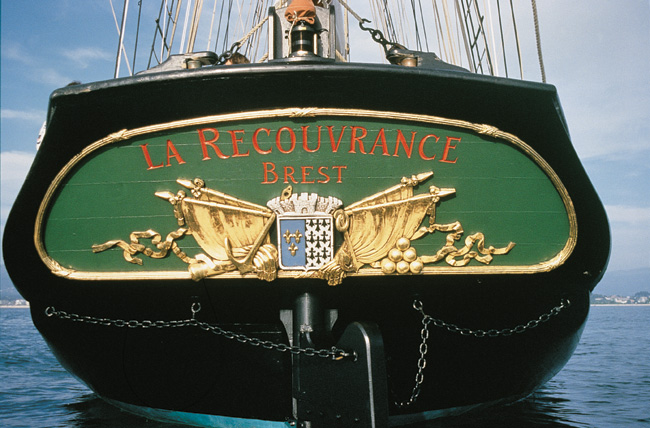
The vessel's decorated stern

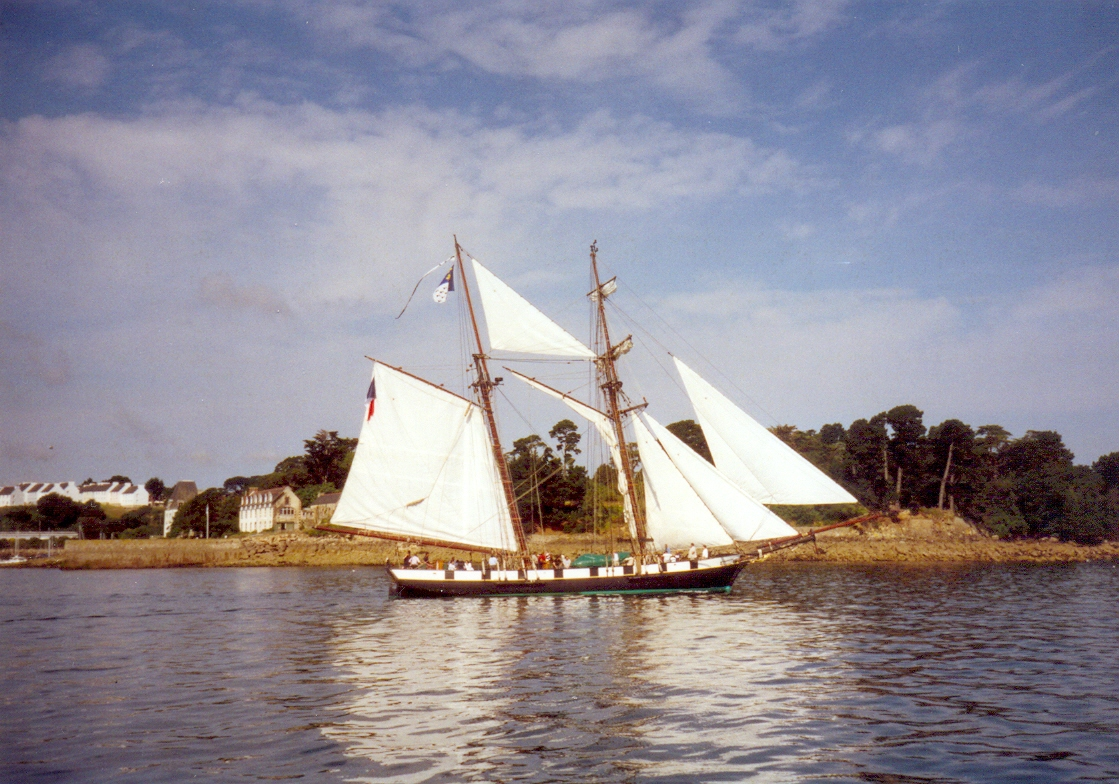
La Recouvrance under partial sail

== See also ==
- Media related to La Recouvrance at Wikimedia Commons
- List of schooners
