= Celso Álvarez Cáccamo =

Galician writer and sociolinguist

- Born: 1958 (age 67–68); Vigo
- Occupations: writer and sociolinguist
- Writing career
- Genres: poetry, linguistics

Celso Álvarez Cáccamo, born in Vigo, Galicia, Spain in 1958, is an author and sociolinguist.

Álvarez Cáccamo earned a doctorate from the University of California, Berkeley with his dissertation, The Institutionalization of Galician: Linguistic Practices, Power, and Ideology in Public Discourse. He also earned a degree in Spanish Language and Literature from the State University of New York at Buffalo. He is currently a professor of linguistics at University of A Coruña.

Álvarez Cáccamo is the author of multiple academic articles in the field of sociolinguistics. He is also a poet and a contributor to the journal Vieiros.

== Selected works ==
=== Poetry ===
- Os distantes (1995, Espiral Maior).
- Escolma de familia. Cen anos de poesía (2000, Xerais). (collective volume)
- Poemas ao pai (2008, Espiral Maior). (collective volume)
- Os passos da procura (2018, Através).

=== Linguistics ===
- "Rethinking conversational code-switching: codes, speech varieties, and contextualization" (1990). Proceedings of the Sixteenth Annual Meeting of the Berkeley Linguistics Society doi:10.3765/bls.v16i0.1716
- "Building alliances in political discourse: language, institutional authority, and resistance" (1996). Folia Linguistica doi:10.1515/flin.1996.30.3-4.245
- "From 'switching code' to 'code switching': towards a reconceptualisation of communicative codes" (1998). in Peter Auer (ed.) Code-Switching in Conversation. Language, interaction and identity
- "Para um modelo do 'code-switching' ea alternância de variedades como fenómenos distintos: dados do discurso galego-português/espanhol na Galiza" (2000). Estudios de sociolingüística (in Galician)
