= Bireme =

Ancient oared warship with two decks of oars

A bireme (/ˈbaɪriːm/, BY-reem) is an ancient oared warship (galley) with two superimposed rows of oars on each side. Biremes were long vessels built for military purposes and could achieve relatively high speed. They were invented well before the 6th century BC and were used by the Phoenicians, Assyrians, and Greeks.

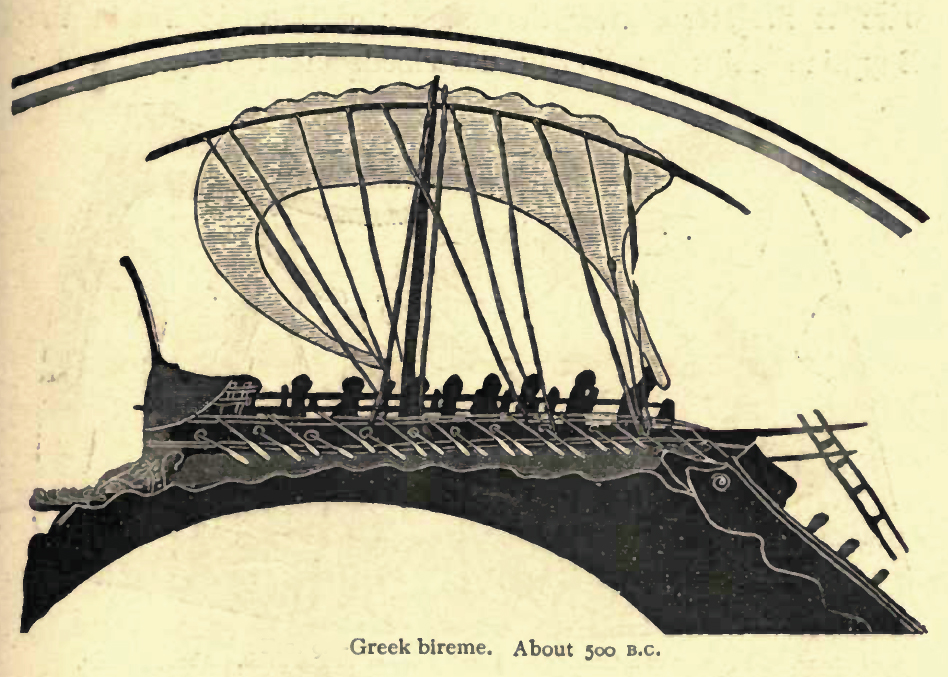
Greek bireme circa 500 BC, image from a Greek vase in the British Museum, which was found at Vulci in Etruria.

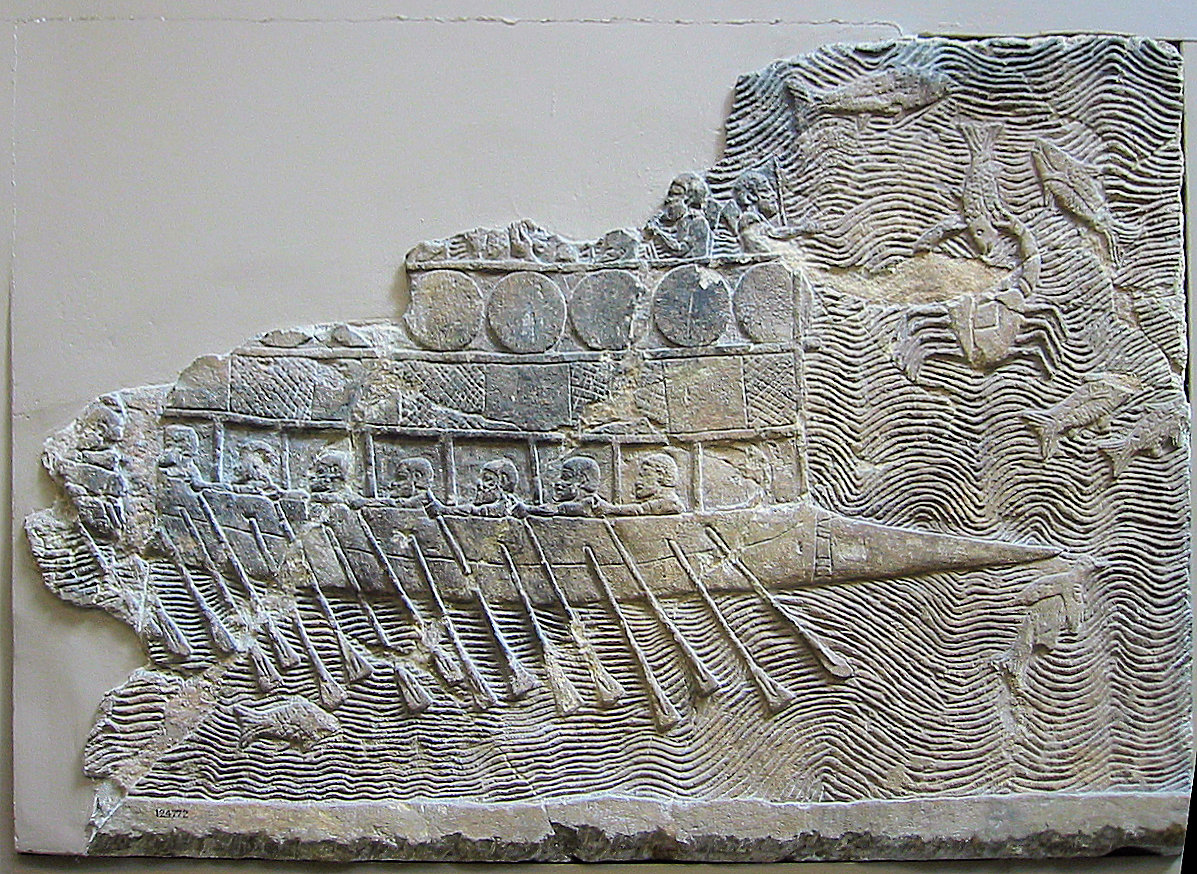
Phoenician warship with two rows of oars, relief from Nineveh, ca. 700 BC

== Description ==
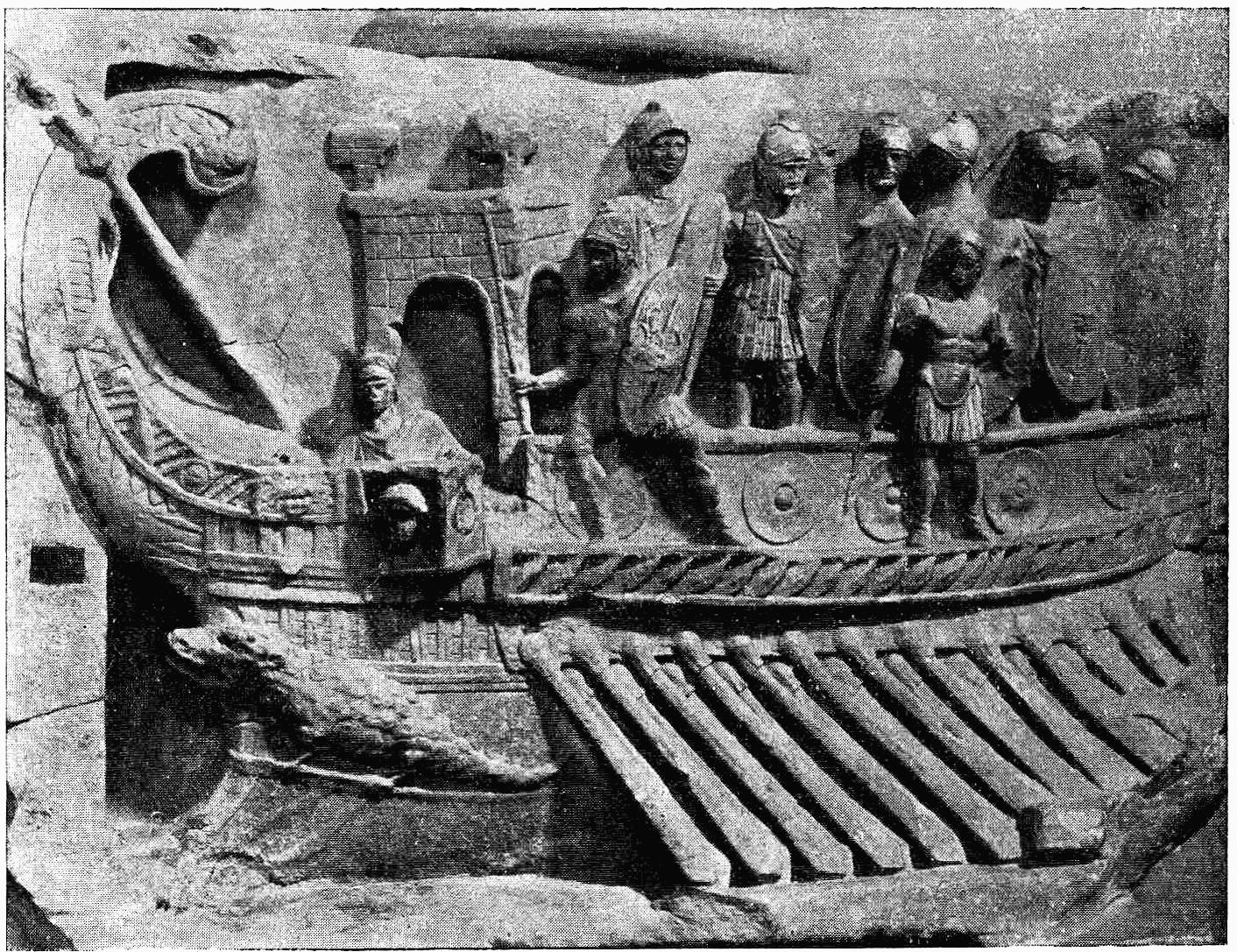
A Roman naval bireme depicted in a relief from the Temple of Fortuna Primigenia in Praeneste (Palastrina), which was built c. 120 BC; exhibited in the Pius-Clementine Museum in the Vatican Museums.

The name bireme comes from "bi-" meaning two and "-reme" meaning oar.

It was typically about 80 feet (24 m) long with a maximum beam width of around 10 feet (3 m). It was modified from the penteconter, a ship that had only one set of oars on each side, the bireme having two sets of oars on each side. The bireme was twice the triaconter's length and height, and thus employed 120 rowers. Biremes were galleys, galleasses, dromons, and small pleasure crafts called pamphyles.

The next development, the trireme, keeping the length of the bireme, added a tier to the height, the rowers being thus increased to 180. It also had a large square sail.

== Uses ==
These ships were frequently used by the Romans, as during the second of Caesar's invasions of Britain. The bireme eventually evolved into the trireme. A unit commandant (who was given a tent on the open deck) directed a group of marines. The bireme was also recorded in ancient history on the 8th and early 7th-century BC Assyrian reliefs, where they were used to carry out an amphibious attack on the coast of Elam and the lagoons of the Persian Gulf during the reign of Sennacherib.

Medieval galleys are also described as "bireme" or "trireme" depending on the number of their banks of oars. The terminology can lead to confusion, since the terms are also used for rowed warships of the Greco-Roman period built on entirely different design principles.

== Dimensions and development ==
In 1275, Charles of Anjou, king of Sicily, issued an order for the construction of several galleys that provide the earliest evidence for the dimensions of the bireme galleys. Because of increased weight and breadth, which brought increased friction through the water, a trireme galley was not dramatically faster than a bireme. But the change to trireme produced more significant developments than a gain in tactical speed over short distances. Early bireme galleys escorted merchant ships but were rarely used to carry goods. A few Genoese freight contracts of the mid-13th century record charters for bireme galleys.

== See also ==
- Ivlia (ship)
