= Celes Ernesto Cárcamo =

Argentine psychiatrist (1903–1990)

Celes Ernesto Cárcamo (1903–1990) was an Argentine psychiatrist, interested in psychoanalysis. He was a founder of the Psychoanalytic Association Argentina and became its second president.

Cárcamo received the Konex Platinum and a Diploma of Merit for his work in psychoanalysis.

== Works ==
- The anguish in organic heart disease - 1946, also published in: "Pathology psychosomatic", Buenos Aires, Argentina Psychoanalytic Association, 1948, ISBN 950-9493-27-9
- The Concept of Neurosis - 1961 conference, in: Writings / Celes Ernesto Carcamo. Buenos Aires: Kargieman Lombardi, 1992, p. 389-408, ISBN 950-9493-27-9
- Suicide - 1978, in: Writings / Celes Ernesto Carcamo. Buenos Aires: Kargieman Lombardi, 1992. p. 409-422, ISBN 950-9493-27-9
- The Drama of "Guri" - 1988, in: Writings / Celes Ernesto Carcamo. Buenos Aires: Kargieman Lombardi, 1992.p. 463-477, ISBN 950-9493-27-9, also published in: Journal of Psychoanalysis, *Psychoanalytic Association Argentina, vol 46, n. 1, 1989.
- The Ego and the Mechanisms of Defense Anna Freud (translation) - 1991 - Editorial Paidos, ISBN 978-950-12-4067-2
- Publication Post Mortem - Kargieman Editions, 1992.
- The drama of Guri - Journal of Psychoanalysis, 1989.
