= Cantons of the Finistère department =

The following is a list of the 27 cantons of the Finistère department, in France, following the French canton reorganisation which came into effect in March 2015:

- Brest-1
- Brest-2
- Brest-3
- Brest-4
- Brest-5
- Briec
- Carhaix-Plouguer
- Concarneau
- Crozon
- Douarnenez
- Fouesnant
- Guipavas
- Landerneau
- Landivisiau
- Lesneven
- Moëlan-sur-Mer
- Morlaix
- Plabennec
- Plonéour-Lanvern
- Plouigneau
- Pont-de-Buis-lès-Quimerch
- Pont-l'Abbé
- Quimper-1
- Quimper-2
- Quimperlé
- Saint-Pol-de-Léon
- Saint-Renan
