= Church of St Louis, Brest =

Catholic church in Brittany, France

- Église Saint-Louis de Brest
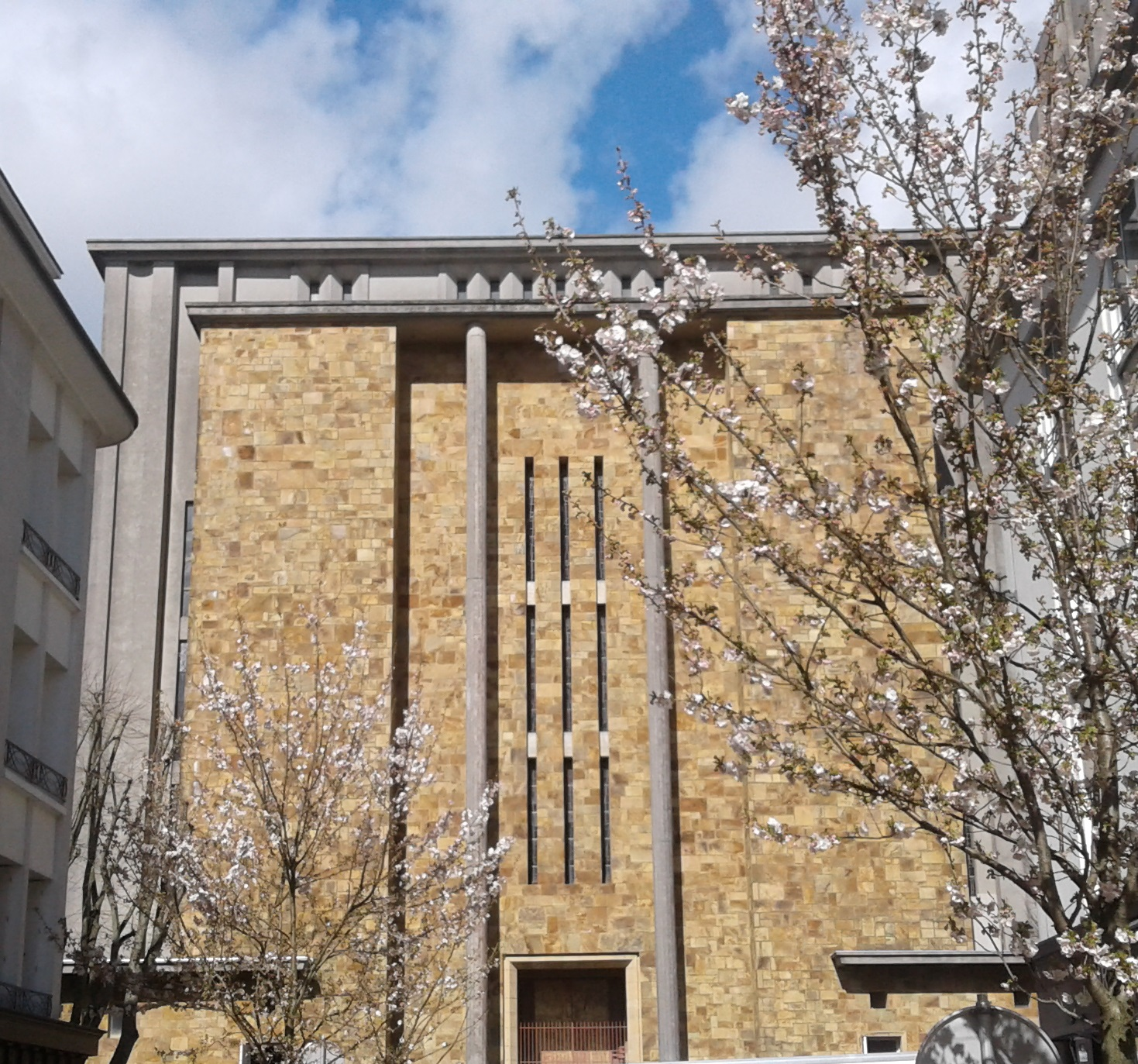
- Church of St Louis, Brest - front elevation
- Interactive map of the Church of St Louis, Brest area

General information
- Type: Parish church
- Architectural style: Modern architecture
- Location: Brest, region of Bretagne, France
- Coordinates: 48°23′20″N 4°29′26″W
- Year built: 1953 - 1958

Design and construction
- Architects: Michel, Lacaille, Lechat, Perrin-Houdon, and Weisbein

The Church of St Louis (Breton: Iliz Sant Loeiz) is a modernist structure built during the reconstruction of Brest after World War II, on the ruins of the former church of the same name, which was constructed between 1686 and 1785. The church is dedicated to Saint Louis, King of France. Designed by architects Michel, Lacaille, Lechat, Perrin-Houdon, and Weisbein, it is the largest French church rebuilt after the war and was listed as a historical monument in 2018.

== The original church ==
The former church was built starting in 1686 and consecrated in 1702, though it was not completed until 1785. Siméon Garangeau, Amédée-François Frézier, and Pierre-Joachim Besnard were each successively in charge of the project. The final building was very different from the initial plans. This structure replaced the old church of the Seven Saints (French: Église des Sept-Saints), which corresponded to the original parish of Brest and was decommissioned for worship before being destroyed by a fire in 1841.

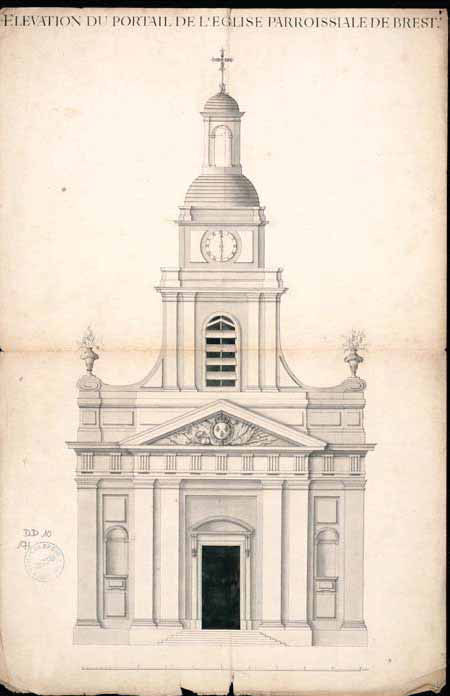
Facade design approx. 1686-1702

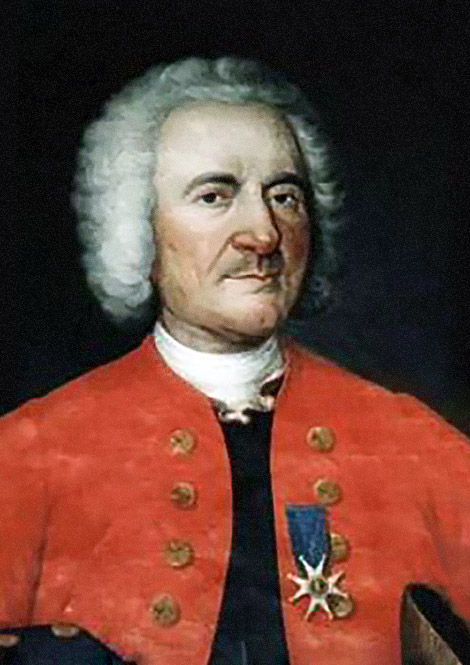
Amédée-François Frézier, one of the architects responsible for the church and designer of the canopy

Garangeau had designed the plans in 1688, but construction was halted by a lawsuit from the Jesuits, who considered themselves the owners of the church. When work resumed in 1742, Garangeau's plans were implemented, but Frézier was able to design the canopy over the high altar to his own taste. He placed it, as he desired, in the center of the choir, using four magnificent monolithic columns of cipollino marble with concentric veins, resembling a sliced onion, which came from the ruins of Leptis Magna. Louis XIV had received a shipment from Libya in 1689, during his reign's peak, but four of these columns were "forgotten" and not used at Versailles, allowing Frézier to acquire them. Completed in 1758, the canopy of the church, a religious architectural work from Frézier’s mature period — he was 76 years old in 1758 — was highly praised by contemporaries for both its structure and its aesthetic. The painting The Martyrdom of the Maccabees, from the high altar of the old church of the Seven Saints, was also located there. Heavily damaged by bombings during World War II and by reprisals from occupying forces in the summer of 1944, the church was ultimately demolished during the post-war reconstruction.

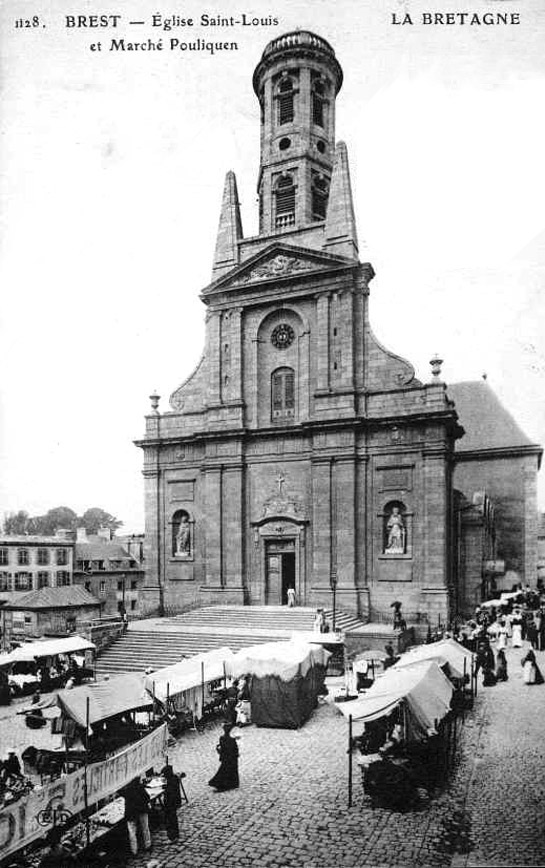
Church of St Louis before 1944

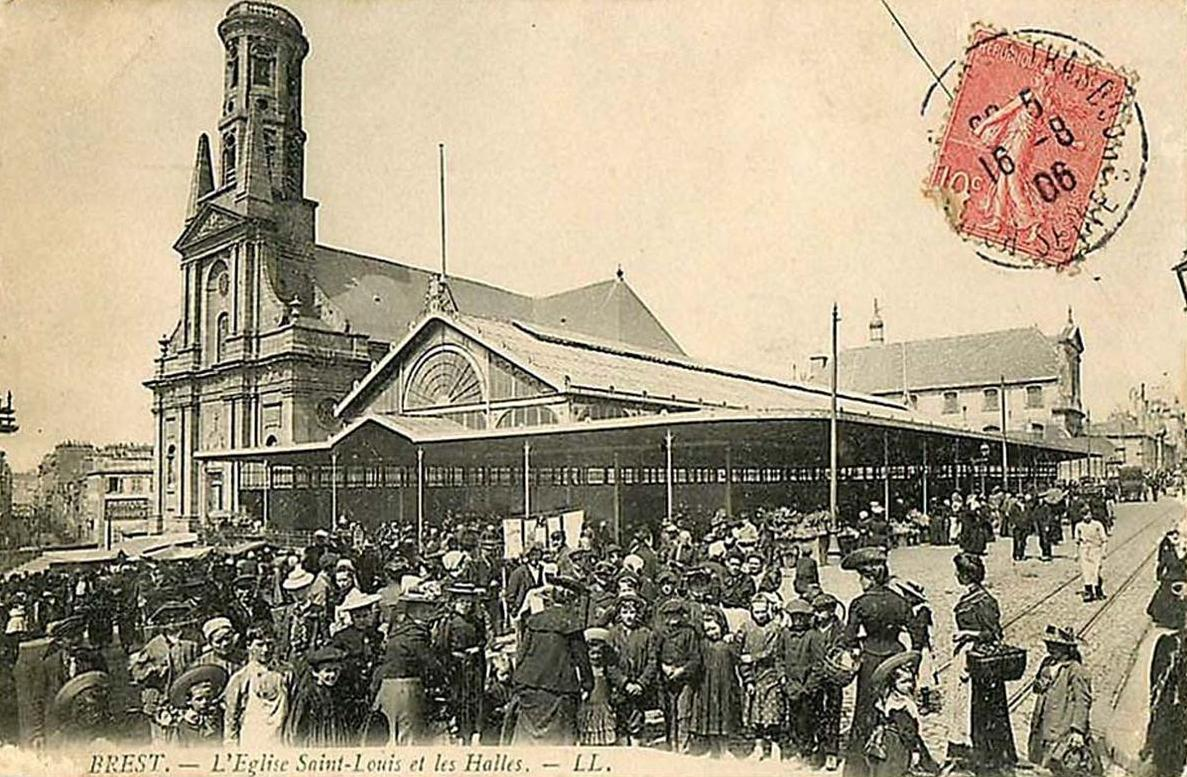
View of the old church of St Louis, the market halls of the same name, Place Étienne Dolet, and Rue Keravel

== The 20th-century church ==
The new church was built between 1953 and 1958 following a competition, by the group of architects Yves Michel, Jean Lacaille, Jacques Lechat, Yves Perrin-Houdon, and Hervé Weisbein. It stands 10 meters above the previous church, some of the ruins of which remain visible in the basement of the current building. The church of St Louis is the largest French church rebuilt after the war. André Quélen, who would later become the bishop of Moulins, served as its parish priest in the 1960s.

Characterized by its vertical architecture, the church draws inspiration from modern churches in German-speaking Switzerland, particularly the church of Saint Anthony (Antoniuskirche) and All Saints' church (Allerheiligenkirche), both located in Basel. The impressive structure measures 95 meters in length, 27 meters in width, and 24.5 meters in height under the vault. It is flanked by a striking reinforced concrete bell tower — its size reduced from the original designs — topped with a copper lantern on one side and its baptistery on the other. A window above the nave illuminates the high altar. The Logonna stone cladding contrasts with the concrete walls, and the almost windowless west wall corresponds to the east stained-glass wall, symbolizing the struggle between Good and Evil; the west wall is also blind due to weathering. The red doors symbolize the blood of the Brestois who died during the war, while their shape evokes that of submarine hatches, serving as a reminder of Brest's maritime history. The two slender columns at the entrance were not covered in green cipollino marble due to budget constraints.

Although the building remains controversial and somewhat unfinished with its truncated bell tower and missing cladding, the new church of St Louis is one of the few reconstructed buildings in Brest that exemplifies architectural ambition and innovation. The modern art present inside the church is particularly well-executed, featuring the high altar and the crucifix above the sanctuary, created by Philippe Kaeppelin, as well as the altar in the chapel of the Eucharist (also by the same sculptor). The tapestry by Jean Olin, hung above the altar for the chapel of the Eucharist, and the stained glass windows are significant highlights of the overall design. On the northeast side of the nave, the windows by Maurice Rocher depict four Breton saints (Pol de Léon, Corentin, Winwaloe, and Ivo) along with seven other saints and prophets. The windows in the choir, southwest side of the nave, and the chapel of the Eucharist were designed by Paul Bony, Jacques Bony, and Léon Zack, respectively.

== Chalice ==
The chalice has a very particular history linked to the most dramatic moments in Brest's recent past. It was crafted from the gold and silver of the jewelry worn by the victims of the 1944 Sadi-Carnot shelter disaster. After the tragedy, the gold and silver from the victims' jewelry were collected. The families expressed their wish for a chalice to be made from the solid silver, adorned with the precious stones recovered from the shelter.

The chalice was stolen on January 15, 2008, but was recovered a few days later thanks to the vigilance of an antique dealer.

== Stations of the Cross ==
The Stations of the Cross were delivered in April 2017. They were created by Marion Le Bec, who explains that Mel Gibson's film The Passion of the Christ inspired her. This set of Stations of the Cross is notable for having an additional station: Station 15, themed around Mercy.

== See also ==
- Saint-Sauveur Church in Brest
