= Brest, France =

Subprefecture and commune in Brittany, France

Brest
- Subprefecture and commune
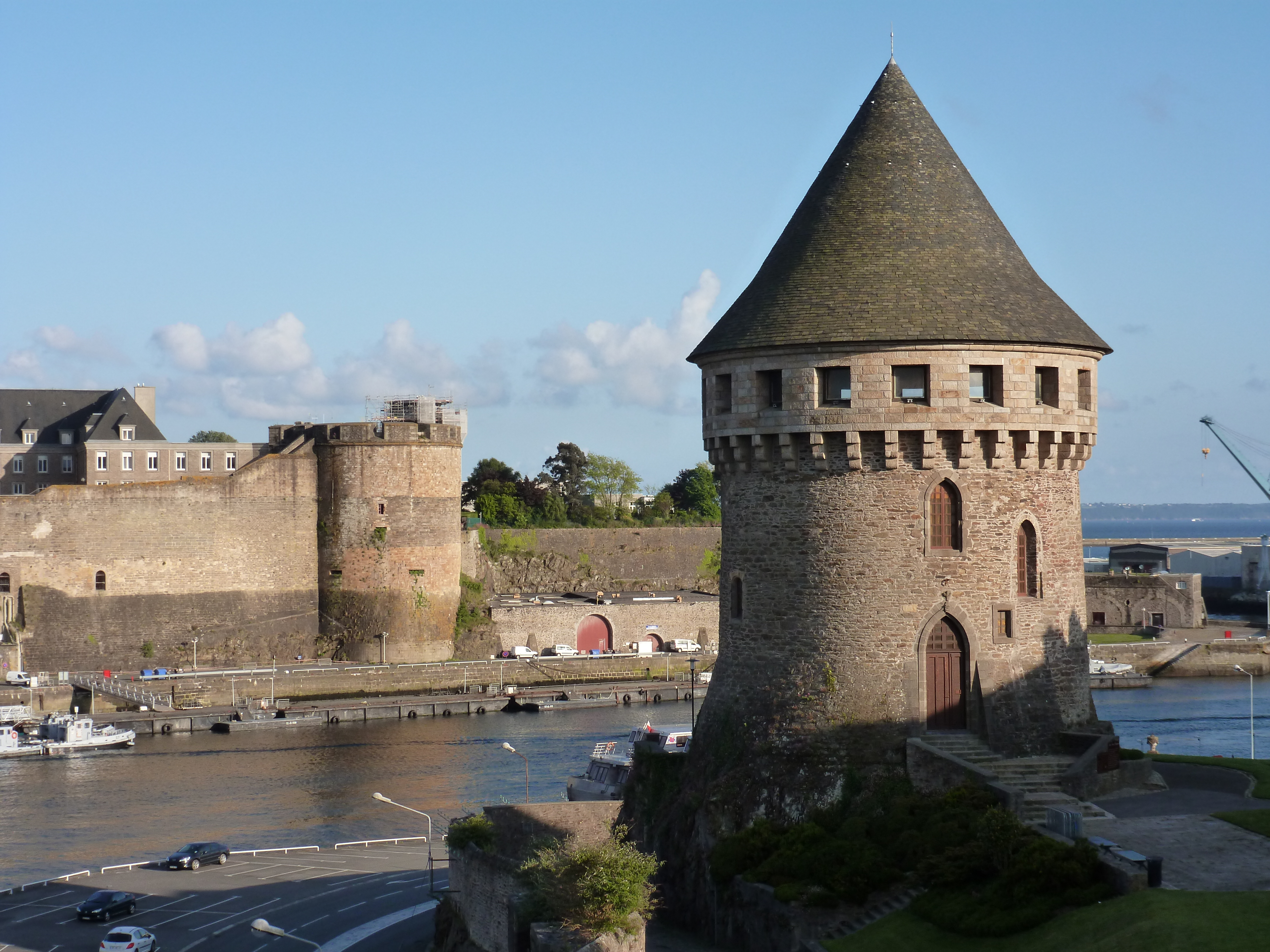
- A view of the Tour Tanguy with the Château de Brest in the background

- Flag Coat of arms
- Location of Brest
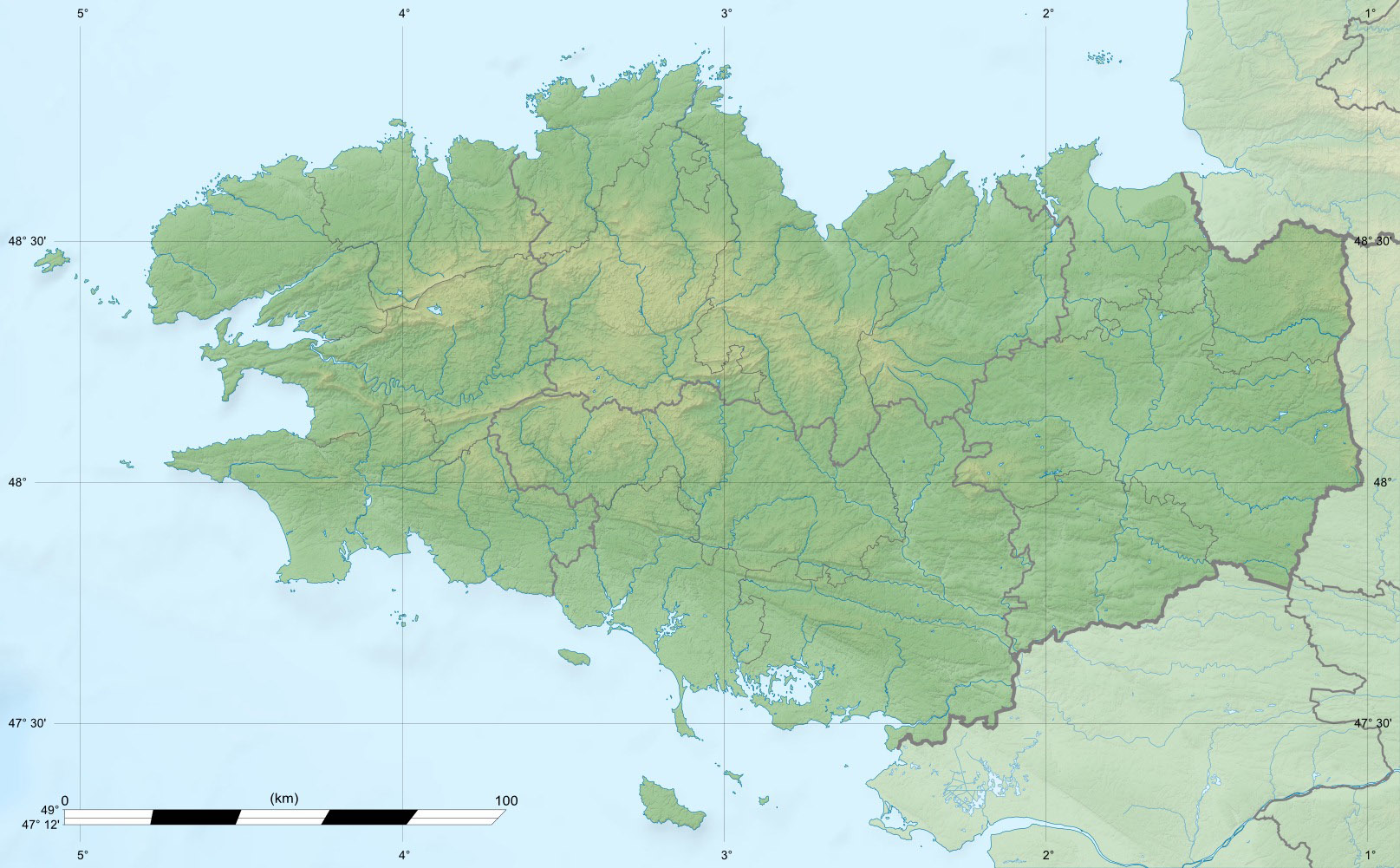
- Location within France Location within Brittany
- Coordinates: 48°23′26″N 4°29′10″W
- Country: France
- Region: Brittany
- Department: Finistère
- Arrondissement: Brest
- Canton: Brest-1, 2, 3, 4 and 5
- Intercommunality: Brest Métropole

Government
  - Mayor (2026–32): Stéphane Roudaut
- Area^{1}: 49.51 km^{2} (19.12 sq mi)
  - Urban (2020): 199 km^{2} (77 sq mi)
  - Metro (2020): 1,265 km^{2} (488 sq mi)
- Elevation: 34 m (112 ft)
- Highest elevation: 103 m (338 ft)
- Lowest elevation: 0 m (0 ft)
- Population (2023): 142,346
  - Density: 2,875/km^{2} (7,446/sq mi)
  - Urban (2023): 207,010
  - Urban density: 1,040/km^{2} (2,690/sq mi)
  - Metro (2023): 381,115
  - Metro density: 301.3/km^{2} (780.3/sq mi)
- Demonym(s): Brestois (masculine); Brestoise (feminine)
- Time zone: UTC+01:00 (CET)
  - Summer (DST): UTC+02:00 (CEST)
- INSEE/Postal code: 29019 /29200
- Website: brest.fr
- ^{1} French Land Register data, which excludes lakes, ponds, glaciers > 1 km^{2} (0.386 sq mi or 247 acres) and river estuaries.

Brest (French pronunciation: [bʁɛst], Breton: [bʀest]) is a port city in the French department of Finistère, Brittany. Located in a sheltered bay not far from the western tip of a peninsula and the western extremity of metropolitan France, Brest is an important harbour and the second largest French military port after Toulon. The city is located on the western edge of continental France with 142,346 inhabitants (2023), Brest forms Western Brittany's largest metropolitan area (with a population of 381,115), ranking third behind Nantes and Rennes in Brittany, and the 26th most populous city in France (2023); moreover, Brest provides services to the one million inhabitants of Western Brittany. Although Brest is by far the largest city in Finistère, the préfecture (administrative seat) of the department is in the much smaller town of Quimper.

The history of Brest during the Middle Ages is the history of its castle. By the early modern period, however, Brest had become a military harbour, which Richelieu established in 1631. Brest subsequently grew around its arsenal until the second part of the 20th century. Heavily damaged by Allied bombing raids during World War II, the city centre was completely rebuilt after the war. At the end of the 20th century and the beginning of the 21st century, the deindustrialization of the city was followed by the development of the service sector. Nowadays, Brest is an important university town with 23,000 students. Besides a multidisciplinary university, the University of Western Brittany, Brest and its surrounding area possess several prestigious French elite schools such as École Navale (the French Naval Academy), Télécom Bretagne and the Superior National School of Advanced Techniques of Brittany (ENSTA Bretagne, formerly ENSIETA). Brest is also an important research centre, mainly focused on the sea, with among others the largest Ifremer (French Research Institute for Exploitation of the Sea) centre, le Cedre (Centre of Documentation, Research and Experimentation on Accidental Water Pollution) and the French Polar Institute.

Brest's history since the 17th century has been linked to the sea: the Académie de Marine (Naval Academy) was founded in 1752 in this city. The aircraft carrier Charles de Gaulle was built there. Every four years, Brest hosts the international festival of the sea, boats and sailors: it is a meeting of old riggings from around the world (Les Tonnerres de Brest).

== History ==
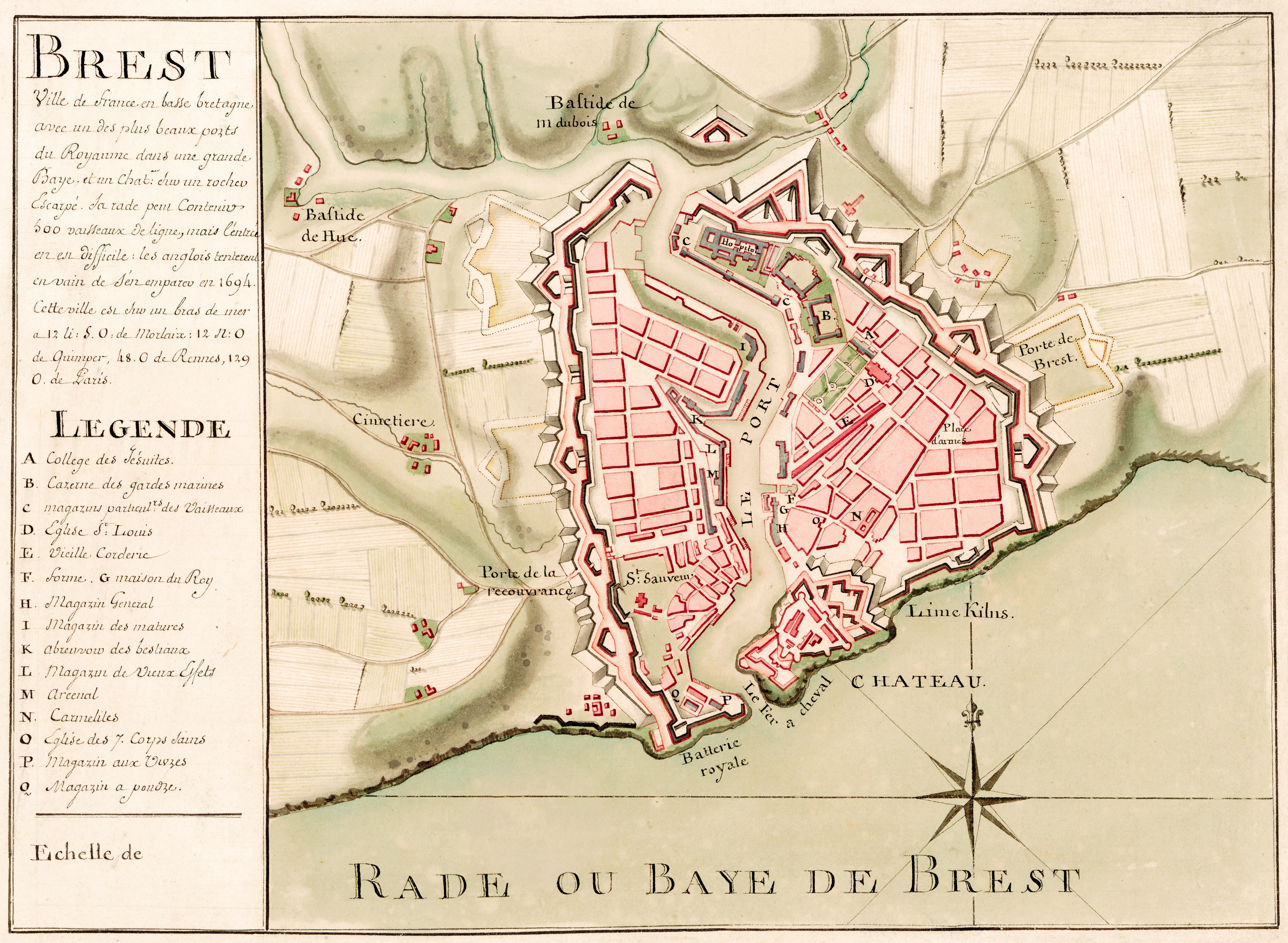
Brest in c. 1700

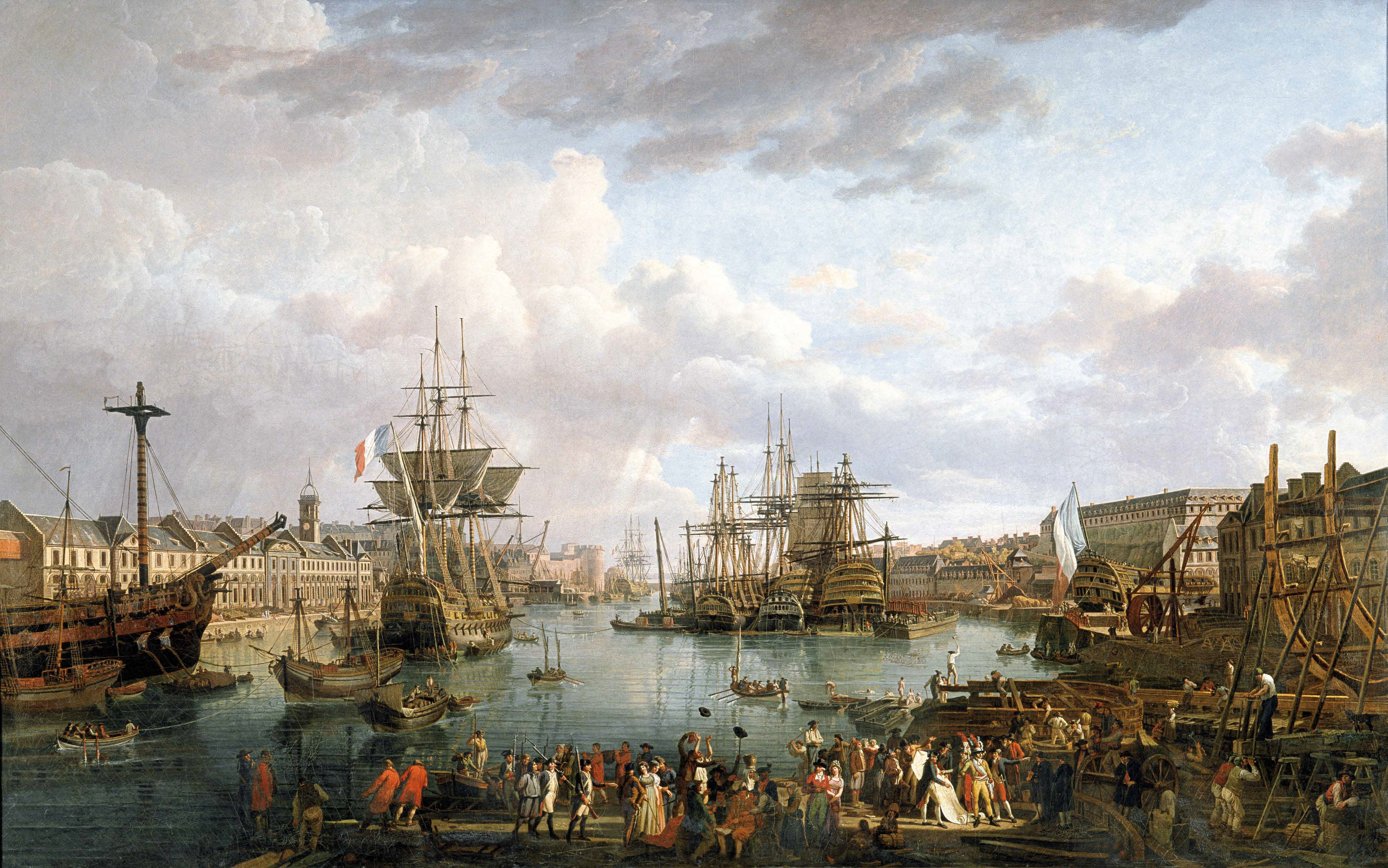
View of the Port of Brest by Jean-François Hue, 1793

In the 4th century AD, Brest was known as Osismis, as attested in the Notitia Dignitatum. Breton Latin sources of the early Middle Ages also refer to the settlement as urbs Ocismorum, using the old name of the tribe of the Osismii. The city is then recorded as Bresta in 856 AD. The etymology is uncertain, but it may be related to bre ('hill').

Brest's fortress appears to have remained underdeveloped in the early 11th century. It was thereafter gradually strengthened by the Breton dukes, and became a key defensive and political stronghold. In 1196, it sheltered the young Arthur of Brittany. In the 13th century, Brest became fully integrated into ducal control, when Duke John I purchased the castle, town, and port.

In 1240, Harvey V, Lord of Léon ceded it to John I, Duke of Brittany. In 1342, John IV, Duke of Brittany surrendered Brest to the English, in whose possession it was to remain until 1397. This was strategically important to the English as it helped protect their communication with Gascony. The importance of Brest in medieval times was great enough to give rise to the saying, "He is not the Duke of Brittany who is not the Lord of Brest." With the marriage of Francis I of France to Claude, the daughter of Anne of Brittany, the definitive overlordship of Brest – together with the rest of the duchy – passed to the French crown in 1514

Starting in 1534 Brest and the rest of Brittany become fully part of France as the Province of Brittany. The advantages of Brest's situation as a seaport town were first recognized by Cardinal Richelieu, who in 1631 constructed a harbour with wooden wharves. This soon became a base for the French Navy. Jean-Baptiste Colbert, finance minister under Louis XIV, rebuilt the wharves in masonry and otherwise improved the harbour. Fortifications by Vauban (1633–1707) followed in 1680–1688. These fortifications, and with them the naval importance of the town, were to continue to develop throughout the 18th century.

In 1694, an Anglo-Dutch squadron under Lord Berkeley was soundly defeated in its attack on Brest.

During the repression of January and February 1894, the gendarmes conducted raids targeting the anarchists living there, without much success. They notably surrounded the house of Régis Meunier with their bayonnets fixed.

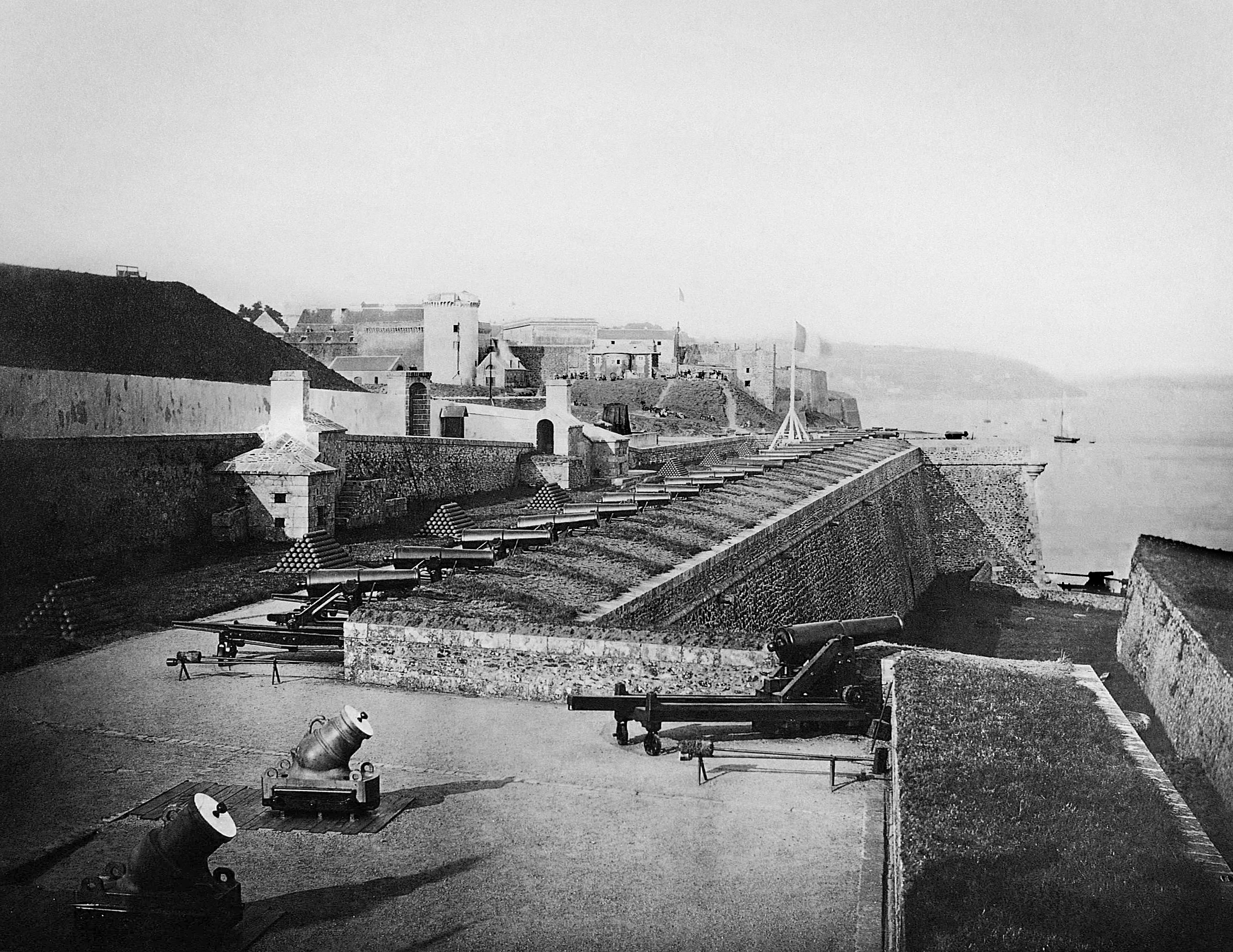
Gustave Le Gray: la batterie Royale à Brest, 1858

In 1917, during the First World War, Brest was used as the disembarking port for many of the troops coming from the United States. Thousands of such men came through the port on their way to the front lines. The United States Navy established a naval air station on 13 February 1918 to operate seaplanes. This port also became a hot spot where the U.S. Navy and the French Navy engaged in underwater combat with German submarines. The base closed shortly after the Armistice of 11 November 1918.

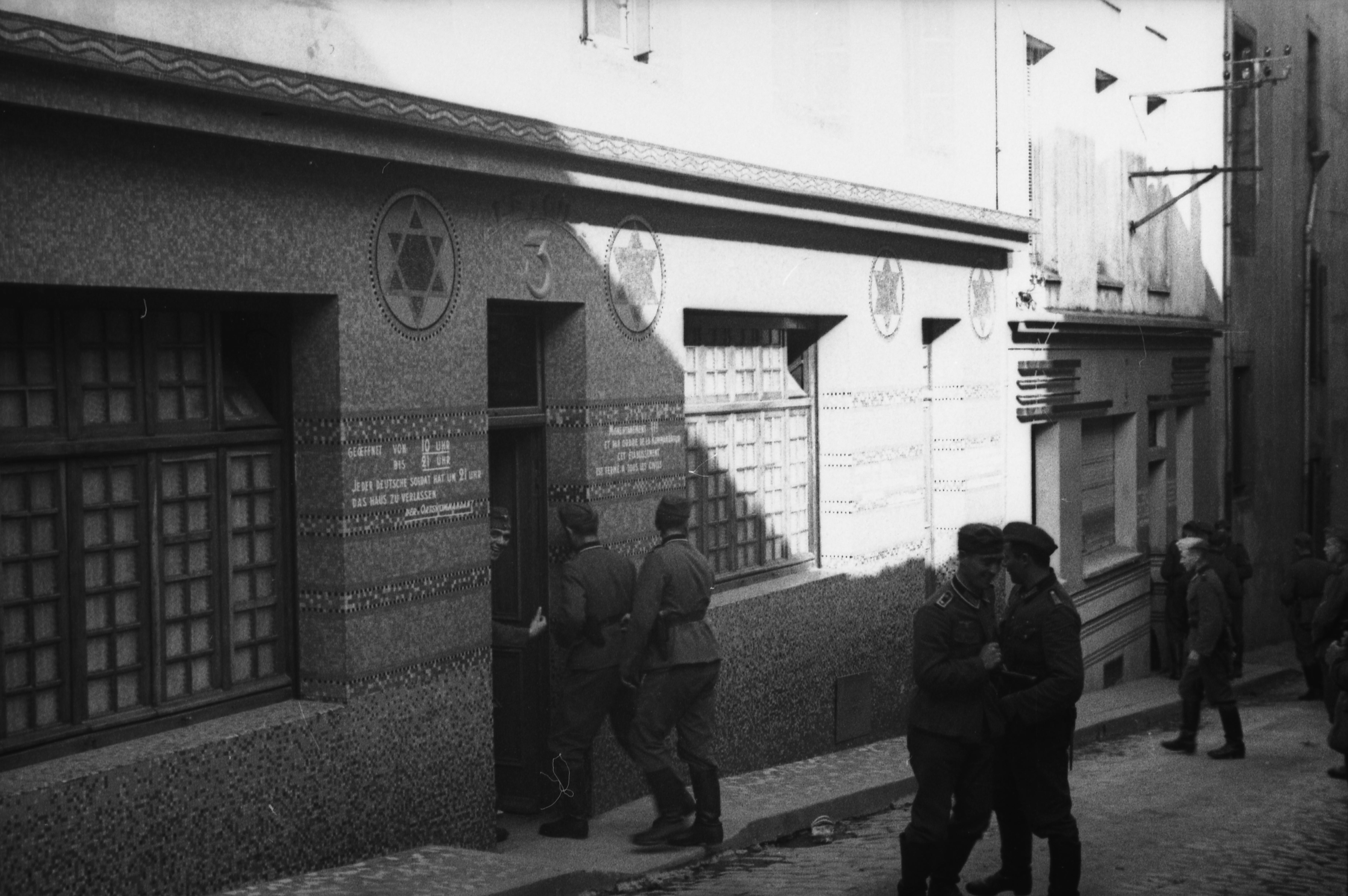
German soldiers entering a Soldatenbordell in Brest, France (1940). The building is a former synagogue.

In the Second World War, the Germans maintained a large U-boat submarine base at Brest. Despite being within range of RAF bombers, it was also a base for some of the German surface fleet, giving repair facilities and direct access to the Atlantic Ocean. For much of 1941, Scharnhorst, Gneisenau and Prinz Eugen were under repair in the dockyards. The repair yard facilities for both submarines and surface vessels were staffed by both German and French workers, with the latter forming the major part of the workforce; huge reliance was made on this French component. (Note: For example, by February 1941 only 470 German shipyard workers had arrived at Brest, whilst the Naval Arsenal had 6,349 French workers. Though work on capital ships was generally done by Germans, French employees worked extensively on submarines and the smaller military vessels in the surface fleet. German Navy reports indicate that this was a willing workforce and that there were no incidences of sabotage. As well as working on ship repairs, the French provided a significant fire-fighting force to help negate the effect of Allied air raids. This story is balanced by Resistance activity, such as that of Jean Philippon, a French Naval Lieutenant Commander who provided important ship movement intelligence to the Allies for more than a year. This espionage was a key component in the effectiveness of Allied air raids which ultimately led to the removal of German capital ships to safer bases.)

In 1944, after the Allied invasion of Normandy, the city was almost totally destroyed during the Battle for Brest, with only a tiny number of buildings left standing. After the war, the West German government paid several billion Deutschmarks in reparations to the homeless and destitute civilians of Brest in compensation for the destruction of their city. Large parts of today's rebuilt city consist of utilitarian granite and concrete buildings. The French naval base now houses the Brest Naval Training Centre.

During the postwar Nuremberg Trials, a memorandum of German admiral and Seekriegsleitung chief of staff Kurt Fricke from 1940 was given in evidence which suggested that the town should serve as a German enclave after the war.

In 1972, the French Navy opened its nuclear weapon-submarine (deterrence) base at Île Longue in the Rade de Brest (Brest roadstead). This continues to be an important base for the French nuclear-armed ballistic missile submarines.

=== Coat of arms ===
The coat of arms of Brest is divided in two: to the left, there's the three fleurs-de-lis of the former kingdom of France, and to the right it has the ermines of the Duchy of Brittany. These arms were used for the first time in a register of deliberations of the city council dated the 15 July 1683. Additionally, it looks visually identical to the coat of arms of Bourg-la-Reine.

== Sights ==
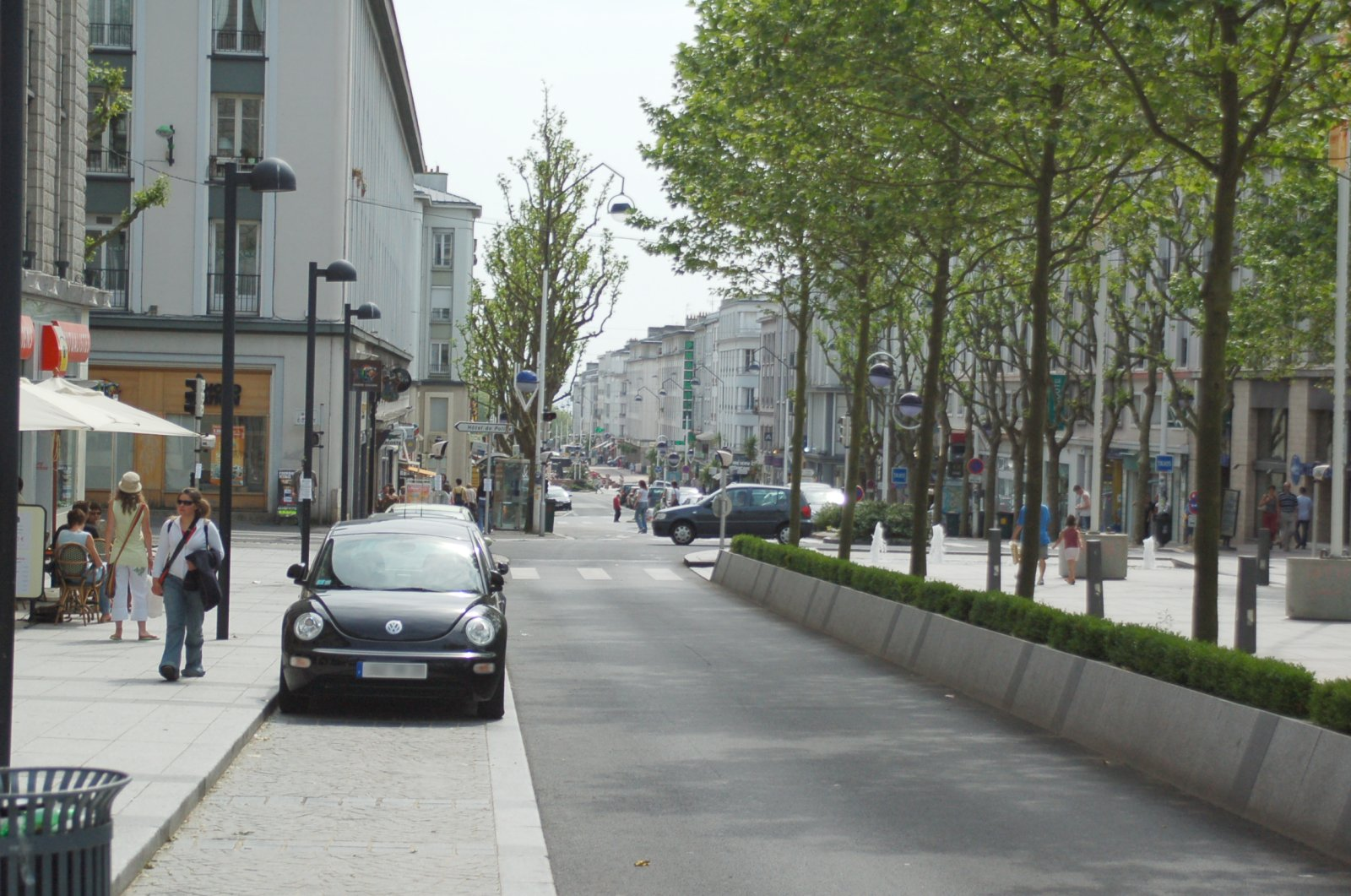
Rue de Siam (Siam Street) in 2006

Pont de Recouvrance (Recouvrance Bridge, is a massive drawbridge 64 m/210 ft high), the military arsenal and the rue de Siam (Siam Street) are other sights. The castle and the Tanguy tower are the oldest monuments of Brest.

The Musée de la Tour Tanguy, in the Tanguy tower, houses a collection of dioramas that depict the city of Brest on the eve of World War II. The Musée national de la Marine de Brest, housed in the ancient castle, contains exhibits which outline Brest's maritime tradition, as well as an aquarium, the Océanopolis marine centre. The city also has a notable botanical garden specializing in endangered species, the Conservatoire botanique national de Brest, as well as the Jardin botanique de l'Hôpital d'Instruction des Armées Clermont-Tonnerre.

The city of Brest does not have much remaining historical architecture, apart from a few select monuments such as the castle and the Tanguy tower. This is due to heavy bombing by the Allies during World War II, in an attempt to destroy the submarine base the Germans had built in the harbour. In the 1950s, the town was hastily rebuilt using a large amount of concrete. In Recouvrance, the west bank of the town, there remains an authentic street of the 17th century, Saint-Malo Street.

A few kilometres out of town, there are landscapes, from sandy beaches to grottos to tall granite cliffs. Sunbathing, windsurfing, yachting and fishing are enjoyed in the area. Brest was an important warship-producing port during the Napoleonic wars. The naval port, which is in great part excavated in the rock, extends along both banks of the Penfeld river.

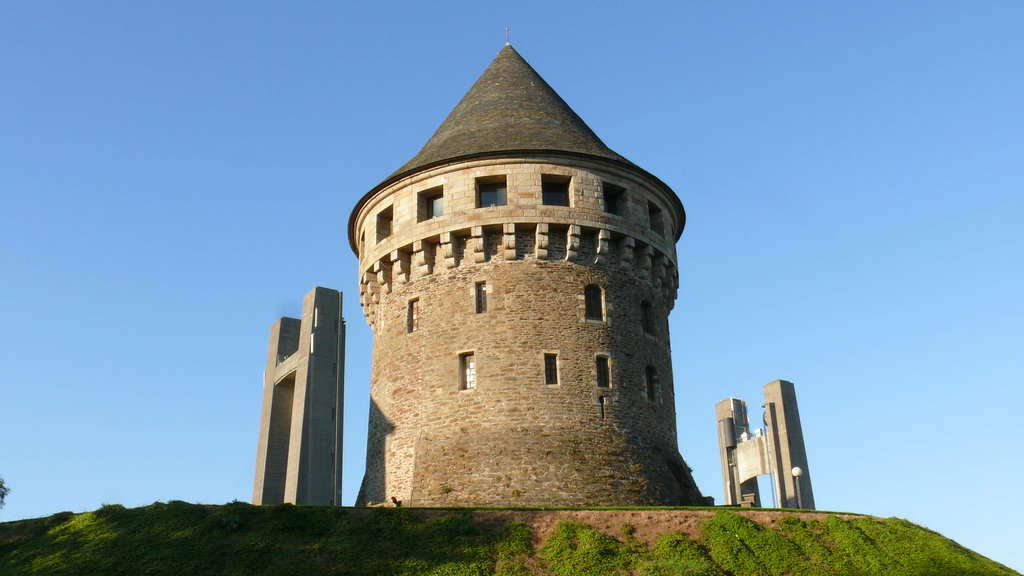
The Tanguy tower hosts a museum of the history of Brest; in the background, the Pont de Recouvrance (Recouvrance Bridge).

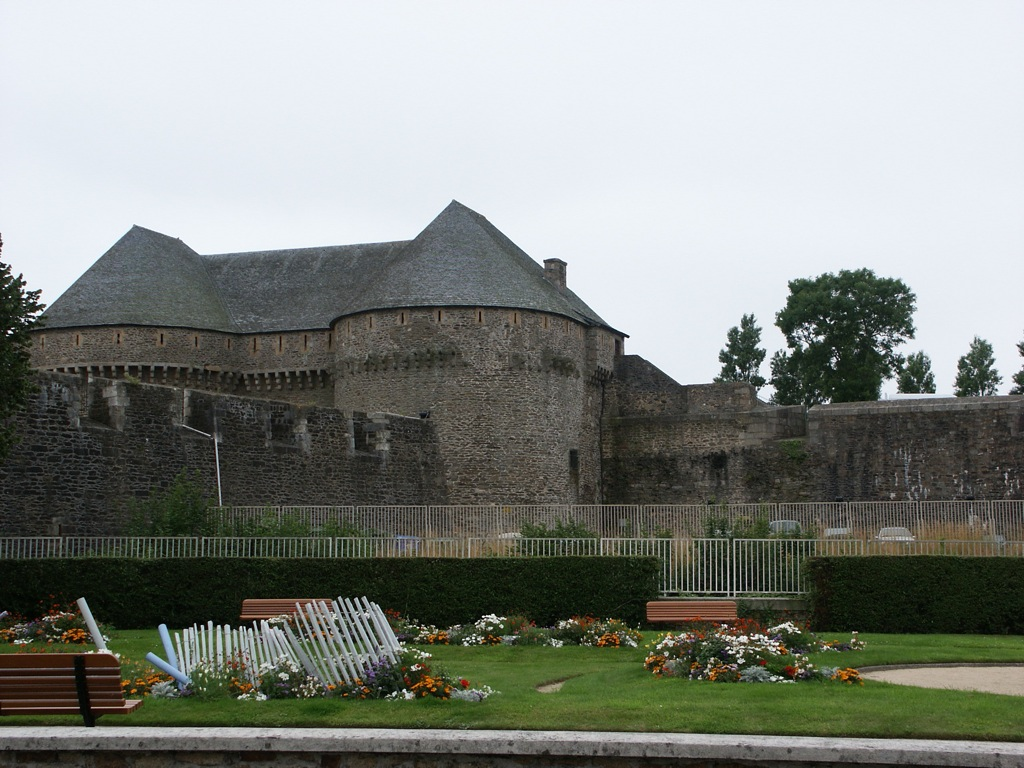
The castle hosts the Musée national de la Marine (National Navy Museum).

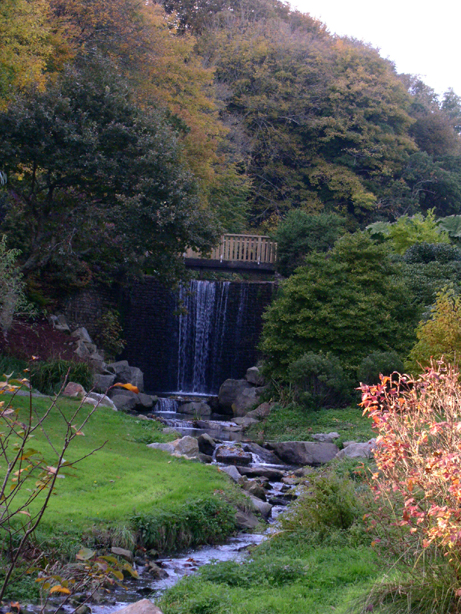
The conservatoire botanique national in autumn

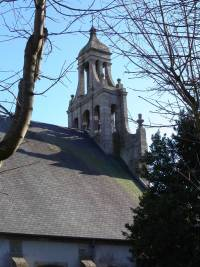
Saint-Sauveur church in Recouvrance, designed by Amédée-François Frézier. Built in 1750, it is the oldest church in Brest.

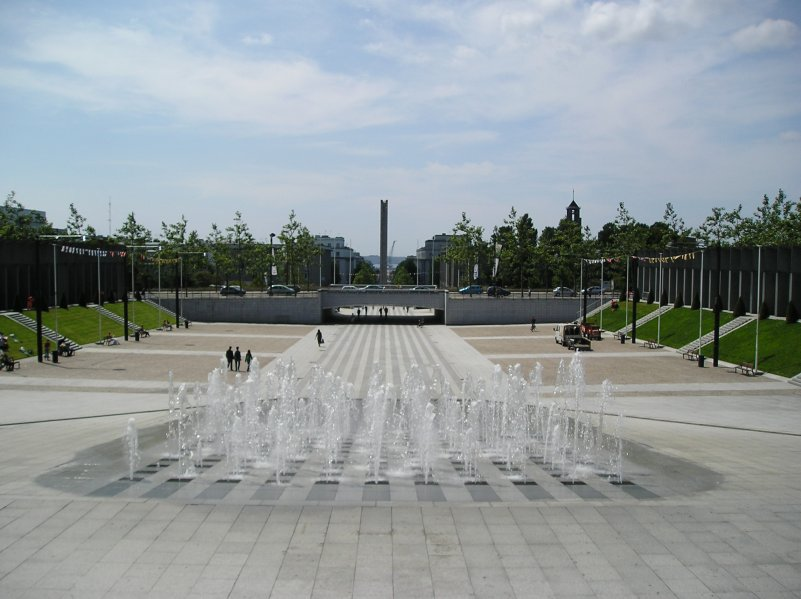
Monumental perspective from the Place de la Liberté opening to the rue de Siam (Siam Street), with the rade de Brest (Brest roadstead) in the background, and on the right, the steeple of Saint-Louis church dominating the rebuilt centre of Brest

== Geography ==
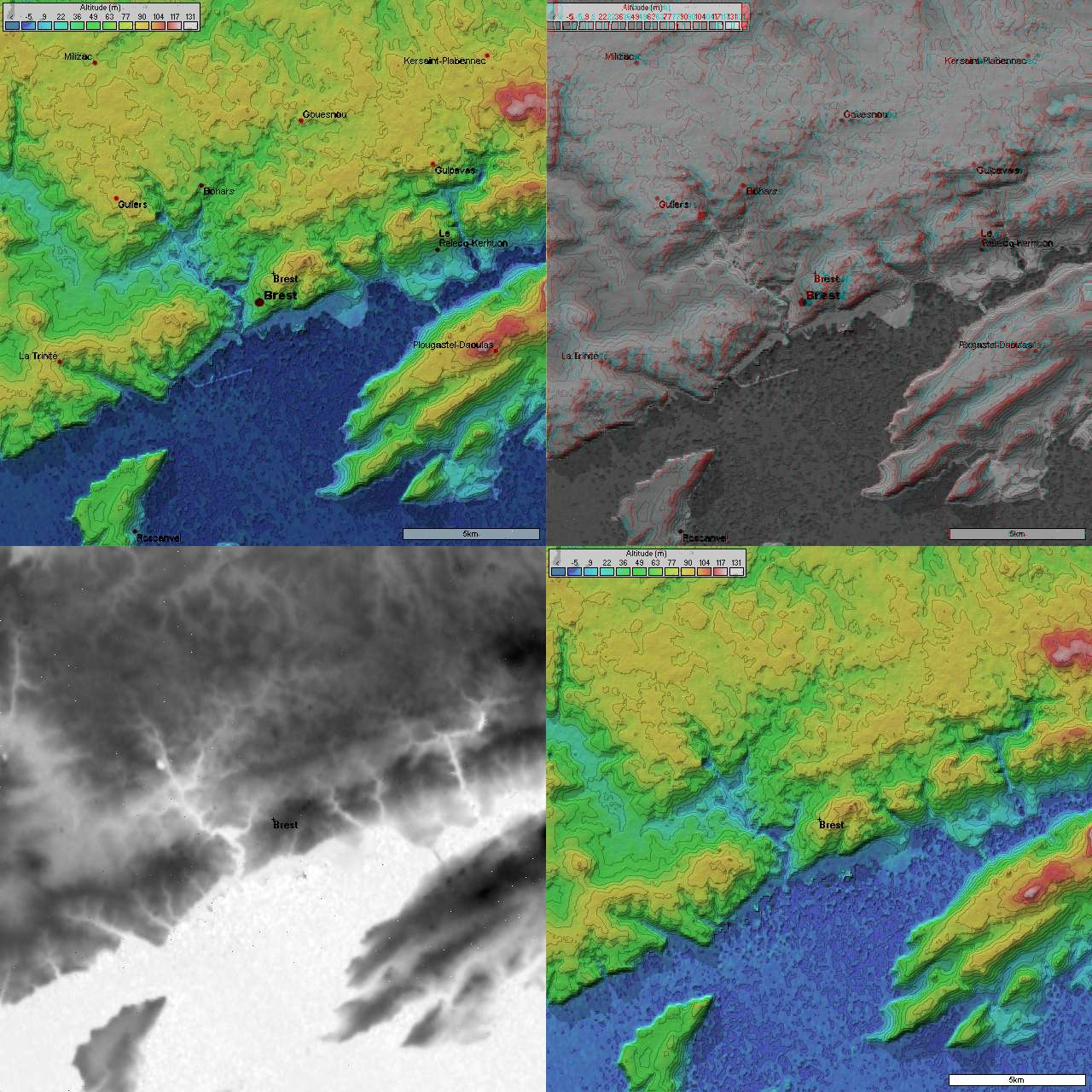
Topography of Brest

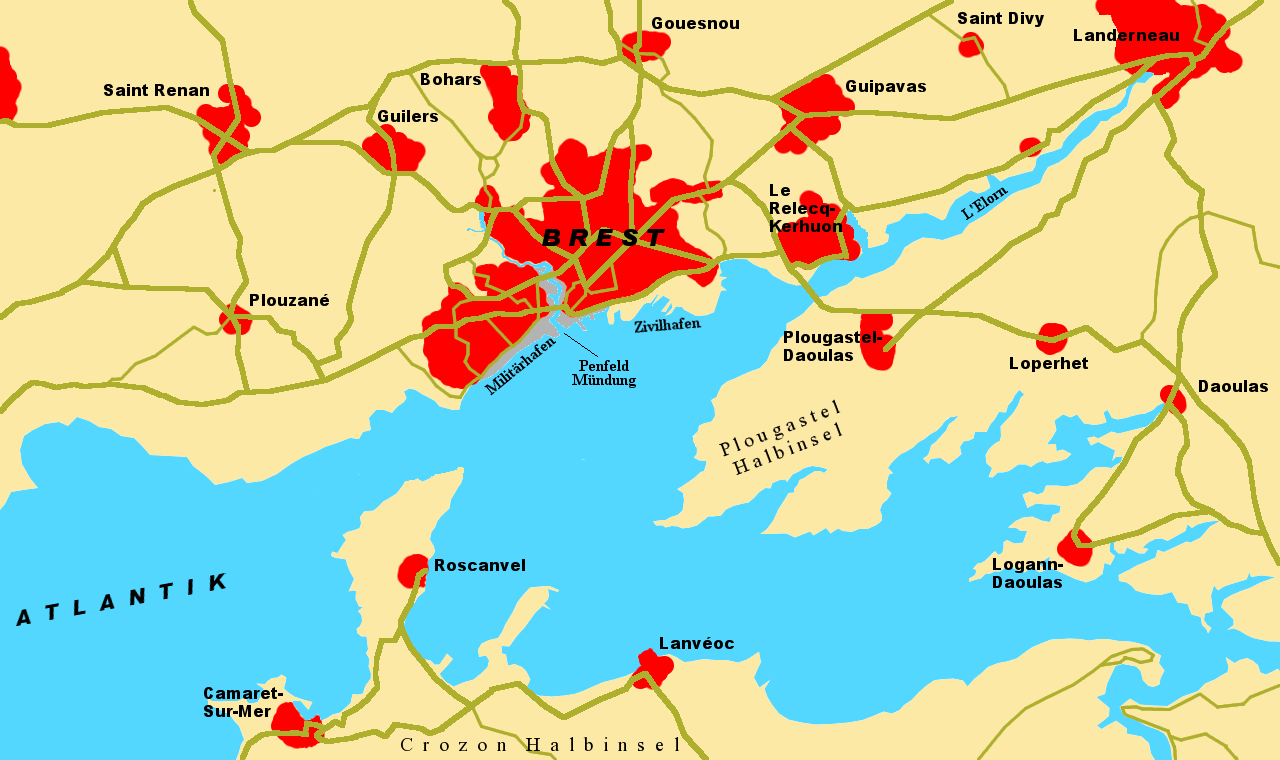
Brest and the surrounding area

Brest is located amidst a dramatic landscape near the entrance of the natural rade de Brest (Brest roadstead), at the west end of Brittany.

It is situated to the north of a magnificent landlocked bay, and occupies the slopes of two hills divided by the river Penfeld. The part of the town on the left bank is regarded as Brest proper, while the part on the right is known as Recouvrance. There are also extensive suburbs to the east of the town. The hillsides are in some places so steep that the ascent from the lower to the upper town has to be effected by flights of steps and the second or third storey of one house is often on a level with the ground storey of the next.

=== Climate ===
Brest experiences an oceanic climate (Köppen: Cfb). As a result of maritime moderation, Brest has cool summers by French standards, July afternoons are cooler than the norm in Western Europe. Rainfall is common year-round, but snowfall is a rarer occurrence since temperatures usually remain several degrees above freezing during winter nights.

An extreme temperature of 39.3 °C (102.7 °F) was recorded on 18 July 2022.

Climate data for Brest - Guipavas (BES), elevation: 92 m (302 ft) (1991-2020 normals, extremes 1945-present)
Month	Jan	Feb	Mar	Apr	May	Jun	Jul	Aug	Sep	Oct	Nov	Dec	Year
Record high °C (°F)	16.8 (62.2)	20.7 (69.3)	23.9 (75.0)	28.2 (82.8)	33.5 (92.3)	39.2 (102.6)	39.3 (102.7)	36.0 (96.8)	32.6 (90.7)	28.1 (82.6)	20.7 (69.3)	18.3 (64.9)	39.3 (102.7)
Mean daily maximum °C (°F)	9.7 (49.5)	10.0 (50.0)	11.9 (53.4)	13.9 (57.0)	16.8 (62.2)	19.1 (66.4)	20.8 (69.4)	20.9 (69.6)	19.3 (66.7)	16.0 (60.8)	12.5 (54.5)	10.3 (50.5)	15.1 (59.2)
Daily mean °C (°F)	7.1 (44.8)	7.1 (44.8)	8.6 (47.5)	10.1 (50.2)	12.8 (55.0)	15.3 (59.5)	17.0 (62.6)	17.1 (62.8)	15.4 (59.7)	12.8 (55.0)	9.8 (49.6)	7.7 (45.9)	11.7 (53.1)
Mean daily minimum °C (°F)	4.6 (40.3)	4.3 (39.7)	5.4 (41.7)	6.3 (43.3)	8.9 (48.0)	11.4 (52.5)	13.1 (55.6)	13.2 (55.8)	11.5 (52.7)	9.6 (49.3)	7.0 (44.6)	5.0 (41.0)	8.4 (47.1)
Record low °C (°F)	−14.0 (6.8)	−13.4 (7.9)	−4.9 (23.2)	−2.4 (27.7)	−0.8 (30.6)	3.7 (38.7)	6.0 (42.8)	5.8 (42.4)	2.9 (37.2)	−1.5 (29.3)	−6.6 (20.1)	−10.1 (13.8)	−14.0 (6.8)
Average precipitation mm (inches)	142.6 (5.61)	118.7 (4.67)	82.2 (3.24)	91.8 (3.61)	74.6 (2.94)	64.6 (2.54)	70.7 (2.78)	75.3 (2.96)	78.6 (3.09)	129.4 (5.09)	146.7 (5.78)	154.6 (6.09)	1,229.8 (48.42)
Average precipitation days (≥ 1.0 mm)	18.0	14.9	13.2	12.5	10.3	9.1	10.6	9.8	10.1	15.4	17.9	17.8	159.5
Average snowy days	1.3	1.9	0.8	0.3	0.0	0.0	0.0	0.0	0.0	0.0	0.4	1.3	6.0
Average relative humidity (%)	88	85	83	81	82	82	84	85	86	88	88	88	85
Average dew point °C (°F)	5 (41)	5 (41)	5 (41)	7 (45)	9 (48)	12 (54)	14 (57)	14 (57)	12 (54)	11 (52)	8 (46)	6 (43)	9 (48)
Mean monthly sunshine hours	61.2	81.7	122.2	165.4	187.5	183.9	180.1	171.8	158.4	109.0	72.3	61.2	1,554.6
Source 1: Meteociel
Source 2: Infoclimat.fr (snowy days) Time and Date

== Population ==
In 1945 Brest absorbed three neighbouring communes. The population data for 1936 and earlier in the table and graph below refer to the pre-1945 borders.

Historical population

Year	Pop.	±% p.a.
1793	24,180	—
1800	25,865	+0.97%
1806	22,130	−2.57%
1821	26,361	+1.17%
1831	29,860	+1.25%
1836	29,773	−0.06%
1841	48,225	+10.13%
1846	55,820	+2.97%
1851	61,160	+1.84%
1856	54,665	−2.22%
1861	67,833	+4.41%
1866	79,847	+3.32%
1872	66,270	−3.06%
1876	66,828	+0.21%
1881	69,110	+0.67%
1886	70,778	+0.48%
1891	75,854	+1.39%
1896	74,538	−0.35%
1901	84,284	+2.49%

Year	Pop.	±% p.a.
1906	85,294	+0.24%
1911	90,540	+1.20%
1921	73,960	−2.00%
1926	67,861	−1.71%
1931	69,841	+0.58%
1936	79,342	+2.58%
1946	74,991	−0.56%
1954	110,713	+4.99%
1962	136,104	+2.61%
1968	154,023	+2.08%
1975	166,826	+1.15%
1982	156,060	−0.95%
1990	147,956	−0.66%
1999	149,634	+0.13%
2007	142,722	−0.59%
2012	139,676	−0.43%
2017	140,064	+0.06%
2023	142,346	+0.27%

Source: EHESS and INSEE (1968-2023)

== Transport ==
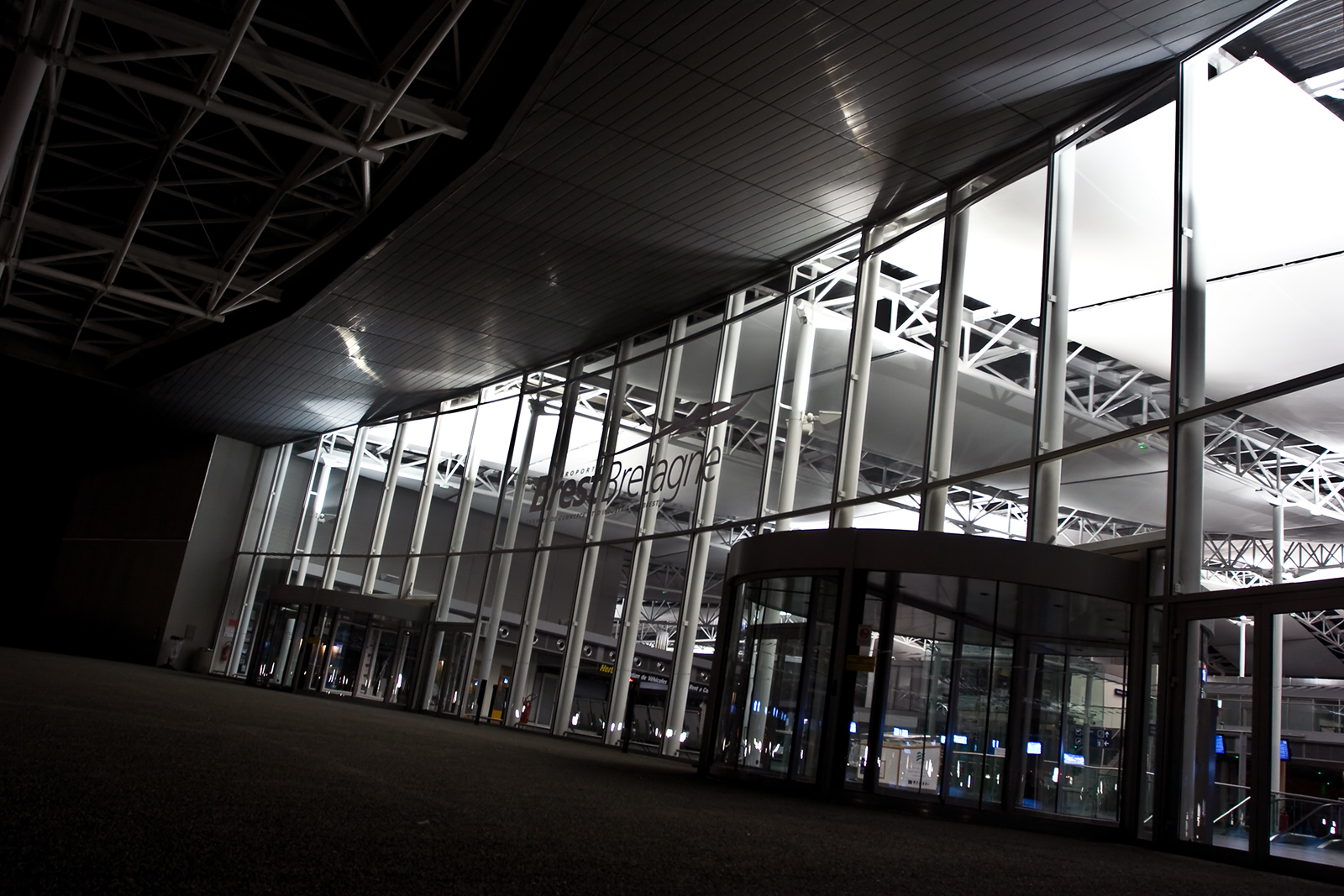
Brest Bretagne Airport, main airport of the region of Brittany

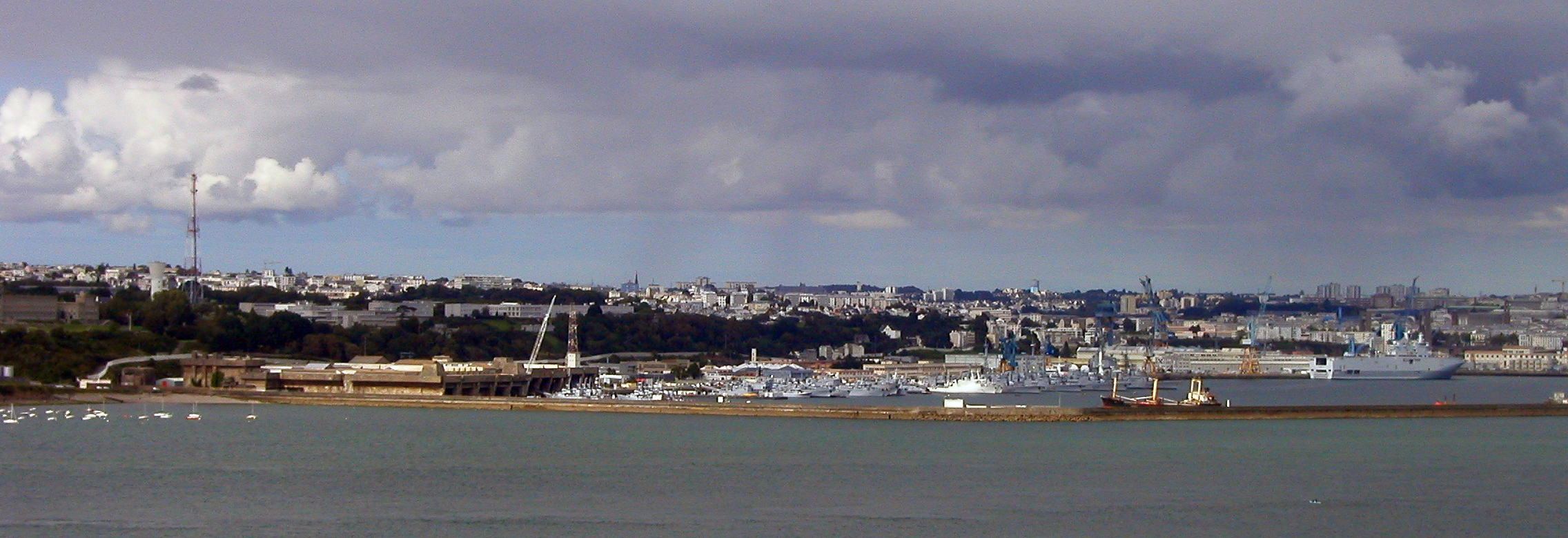
The harbour of Brest

The railway station of Brest, Gare de Brest, is linked to Rennes and Paris and provides services to other stations in Brittany as well. TGV trains to Paris take approximately three hours and forty minutes to reach the capital.

A new 28-stop, 14.3 km (9 mi) tram line connecting Porte de Plouzané in the west with Porte de Gouesnou and Porte de Guipavas northeast of the city centre opened in June 2012.

Brest international airport, Brest Bretagne Airport, is mainly linked to Paris, London, Nice, Lyon, Dublin. The primary operator is Air France (via its subsidiary HOP!). Brest international airport is the main airport of the region of Brittany in terms of passenger traffic with 45% of this traffic of the region, representing 919,404 passengers in 2010. A new terminal has been in service since 12 December 2007 and can accommodate up to 1.8 million passengers annually.

The harbour of Brest is mainly dedicated to bulk, hydrocarbon and freight containers. The harbour's facilities can accommodate the largest modern ships. A cruise ship port is also located in Brest, near the city centre.

== Economy ==
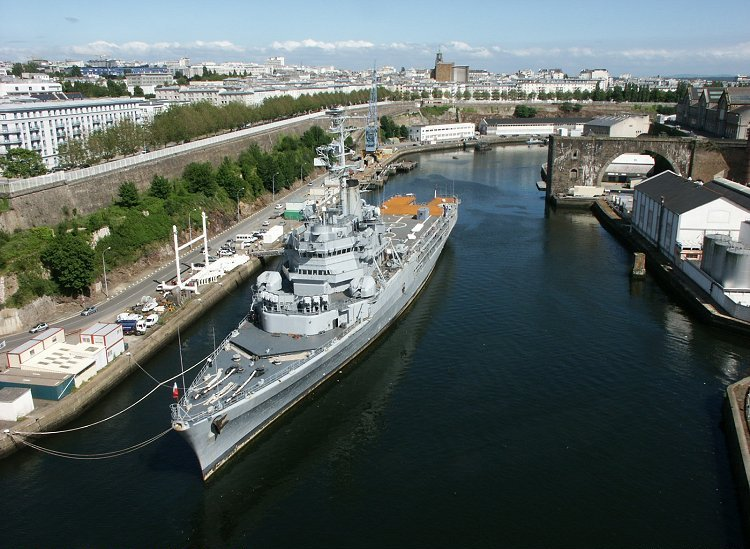
The Penfeld river, historic centre of the arsenal of Brest

Due to its location, Brest is regarded as the first French port that can be accessed from the Americas. Shipping is big business, although Nantes and Saint-Nazaire offer much larger docks and attract more of the larger vessels. Brest has the ninth French commercial harbour including ship repairs and maintenance. The protected location of Brest means that its harbour is ideal to receive any type of ship, from the smallest dinghy to the biggest aircraft carrier (USS Nimitz has visited a few times). Naval construction is also an important activity: for example, the French aircraft carrier Charles de Gaulle was built by Direction des Constructions Navales (DCN) in Brest.

Despite its image of an industrialised city whose activity depends mainly on military order, the service sector represents 75% of the economic activity. The importance of the service sector is still increasing while industrialised activity is decaying, explaining the unchanged rate of working-class in Brest. Brest also hosts headquarters for many subsidiaries like the banking group Arkéa. Research and conception is taking an increasing importance. Brest claims to be the largest European centre for sciences and techniques linked to the sea: 60% of the French research in the maritime field is based in Brest.

Brest has a vast program, combining a restructuring of the city, up to 2025.

== Administration ==
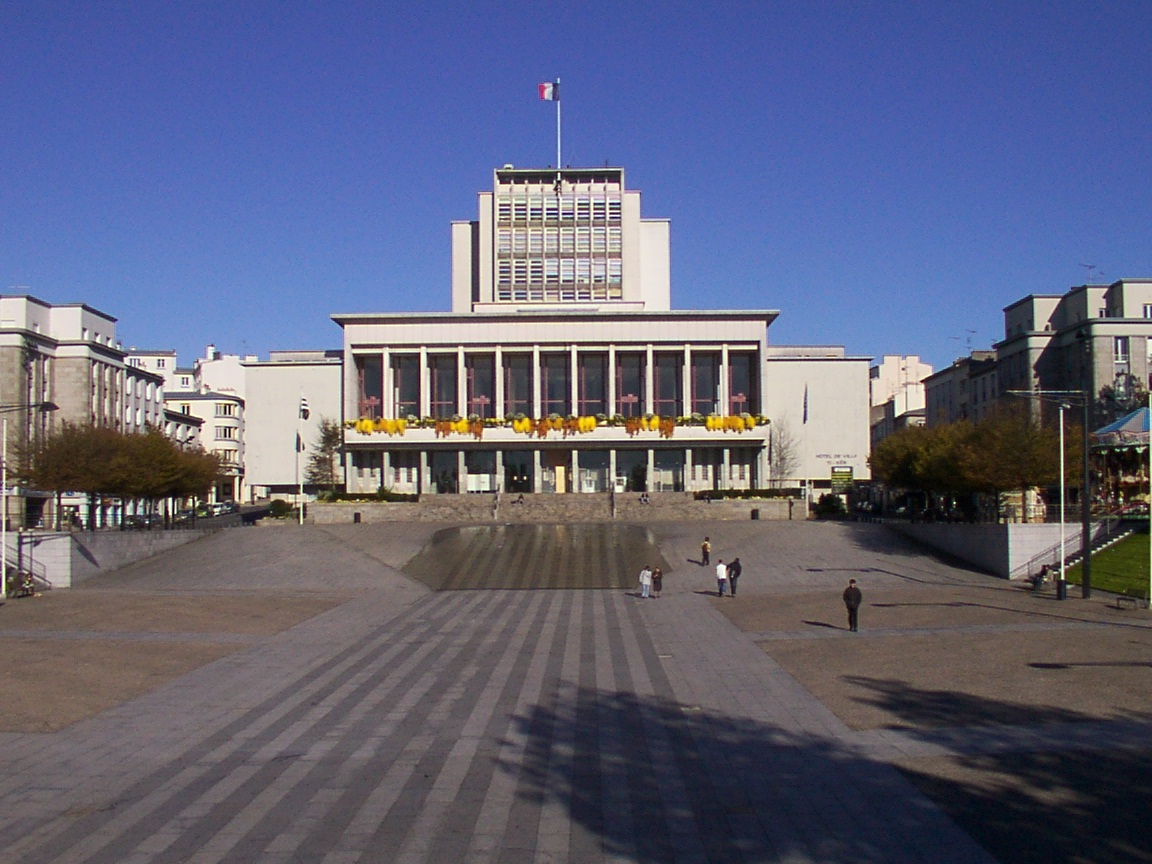
The Hôtel de Ville (City Hall), place de la Liberté

The Hôtel de Ville (City Hall) was officially opened in 1961.

=== Mayors ===
- since 2026: Stéphane Roudaut
- 2001-2026: François Cuillandre
- 1989–2001: Pierre Maille (2nd and 3rd terms)
- 1985–1989: Georges Kerbrat
- 1983–1985: Jacques Berthelot
- 1982–1983: Pierre Maille
- 1977–1982: Francis Le Blé
- 1973–1977: Eugène Berest
- 1959–1973: Georges Lombard
- 1958–1959: Auguste Kervern
- 1954–1958: Yves Jaouen
- 1954–1954: Lucien Chaix
- 1953–1954: Yves Jaouen
- 1947–1953: Alfred Pierre Marie Chupin
- 1945–1947: Jules Lullien
- 1944–1945: Jules Lullien
- 1942–1944: Victor Eusen
- 1929–1941: Victor Le Gorgeu
- 1921–1929: Léon Nardon
- 1920–1921: Hippolyte Masson
- 1919–1920: Louis Léon Nardon
- 1912–1919: Hippolyte Masson
- 1908–1912: Louis Arthur Delobeau
- 1904–1908: Victor Marie Aubert
- 1900–1904: Charles Berger

== Breton language ==
Breton is not commonly spoken in the city of Brest, which was the only French-speaking city in western Brittany before the 1789 French Revolution, despite the surrounding countryside being fully Breton-speaking at that time. Like other French minority languages, Breton does not have any official language status in France.

The municipality launched a linguistic plan to revive Breton as a language through Ya d'ar brezhoneg on 16 June 2006. In 2008, 1.94% of primary-school children attended French-Breton bilingual Diwan schools. Besides bilingual schools, the Breton language is also taught in some schools and universities.

The association Sked federates all Breton cultural activities.

== Culture ==
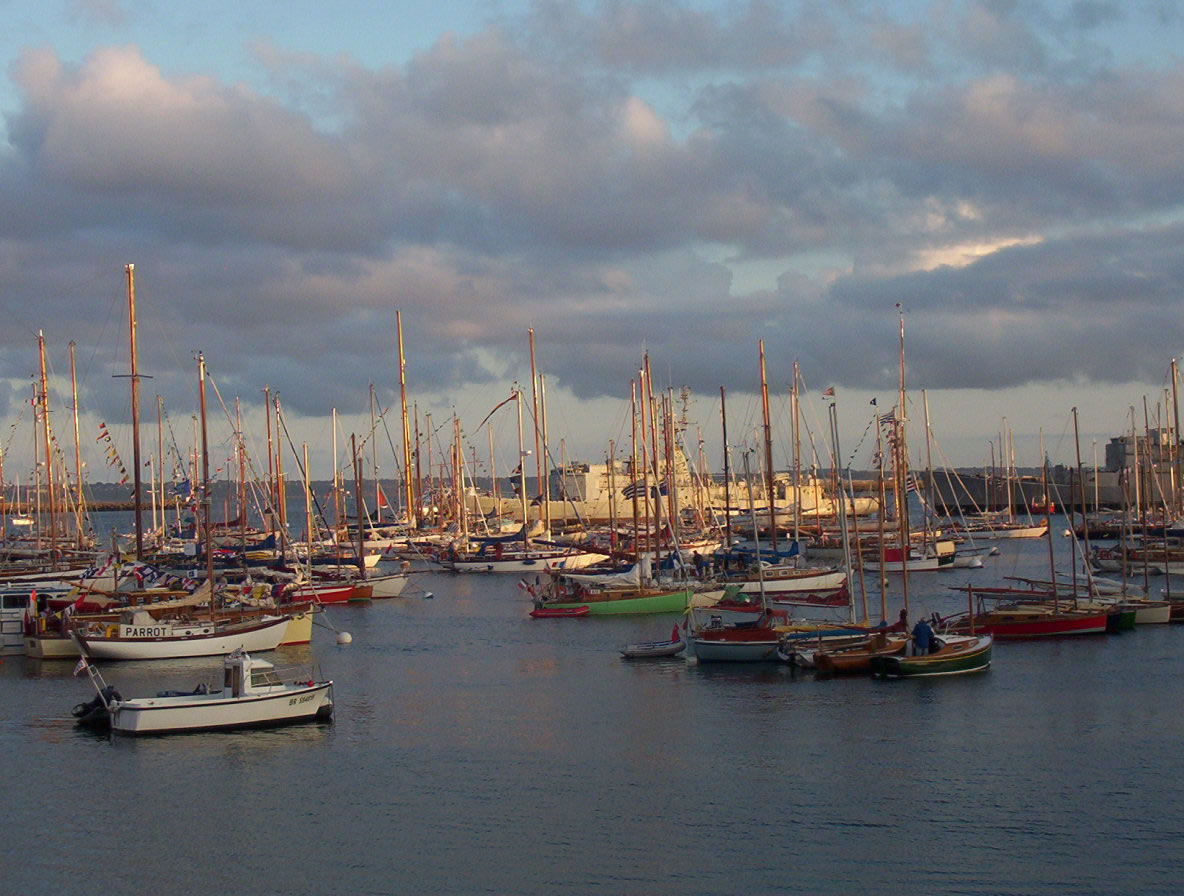
Sailboats during "Brest 2004"

The city is host to several events to celebrate its long maritime history. The largest of these is held every four years, when the town organises a tall ship meeting. The last such tall ship event was "Les Tonnerres de Brest 2016". Due to the COVID-19 pandemic the next event is planned for 2022.

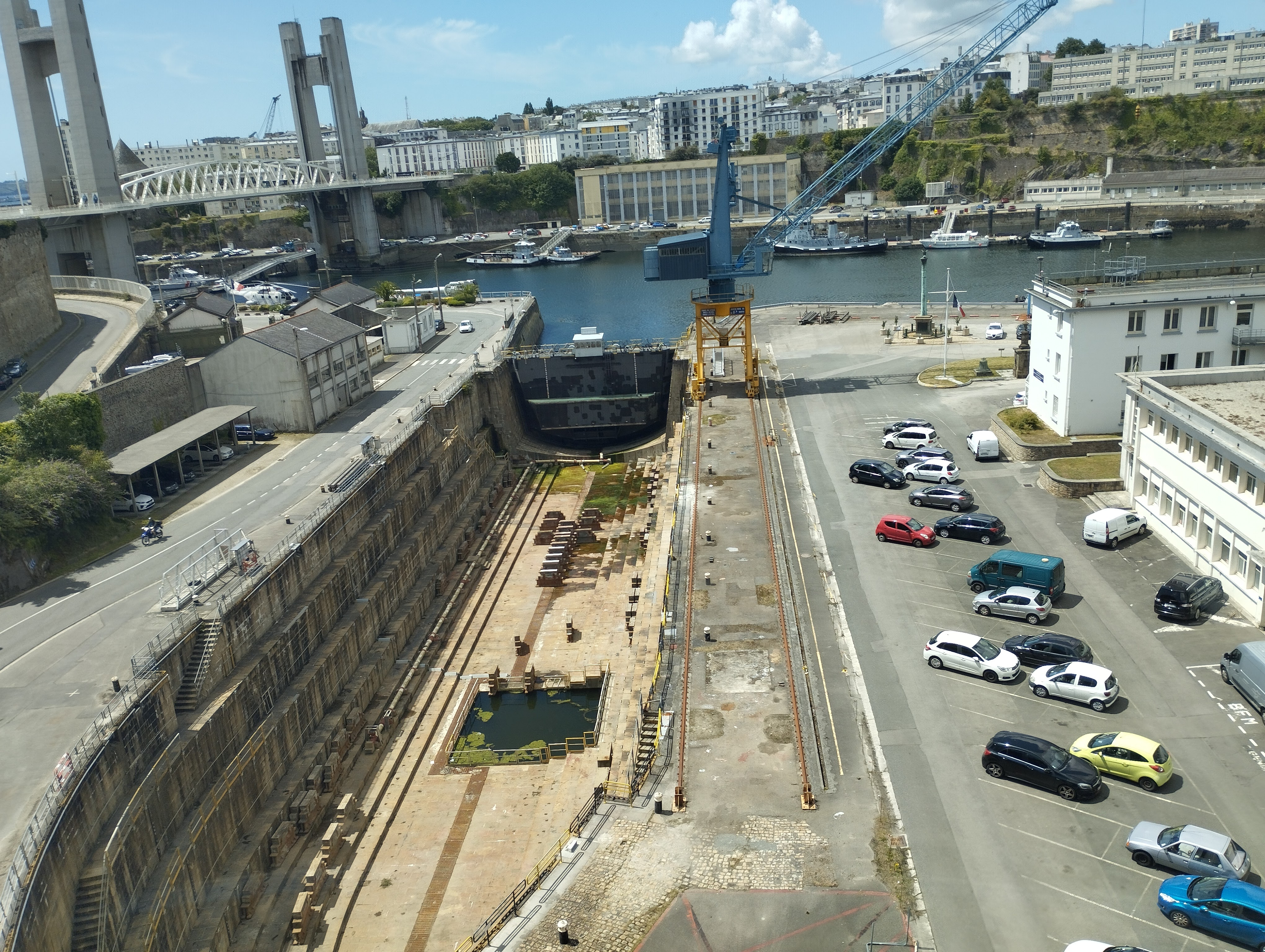
View of the Rade de Brest from the Place des Machines in the Capucins workshops

Brest also hosts an annual short film festival called "Brest European Short Film Festival". The city was the setting for the 1982 art film Querelle, directed by Rainer Werner Fassbinder, itself based on the 1947 novel Querelle de Brest by Jean Genet.

== Cuisine ==
Brittany's most famous local delicacy, the Breton crêpe, is the main culinary feature apart from seafood. There are many crêpe restaurants (called crêperies). Breton apple cider is often featured.

Traditional biscuits include Traou Mad, which is a full-fat butter biscuit similar to Scottish shortbread.

== Sport ==
Brest has held the Grands Départs of the Tour de France on three occasions, in 1952, 1974 and 2008. The 2021 Tour de France started from Brest on 26 June 2021. Stage 6 of the 2018 Tour de France departed from Brest. Since 1901, Brest has served as the midpoint for the 1,200 km (750 mi) bicycle endurance event, Paris–Brest–Paris.

Brest is home to Stade Brestois 29 (commonly known as Brest), a football team in Ligue 1, the top tier of the French football league system. Brest made their debut in European competitions in the 2024/2025 UCL season, after achieving a third-place finish in Ligue 1 a year earlier.

Brest is also home to Brest Albatros Hockey, an ice hockey team in Ligue Magnus, and won the league title in the 1996 and 1997.

In 2002 the Brest throwball team Brest LC reached the 1st division of French throwball but were subsequently relegated due to financial difficulty. The club has recently adopted an Irish influenced infrastructure.

== Research and education ==
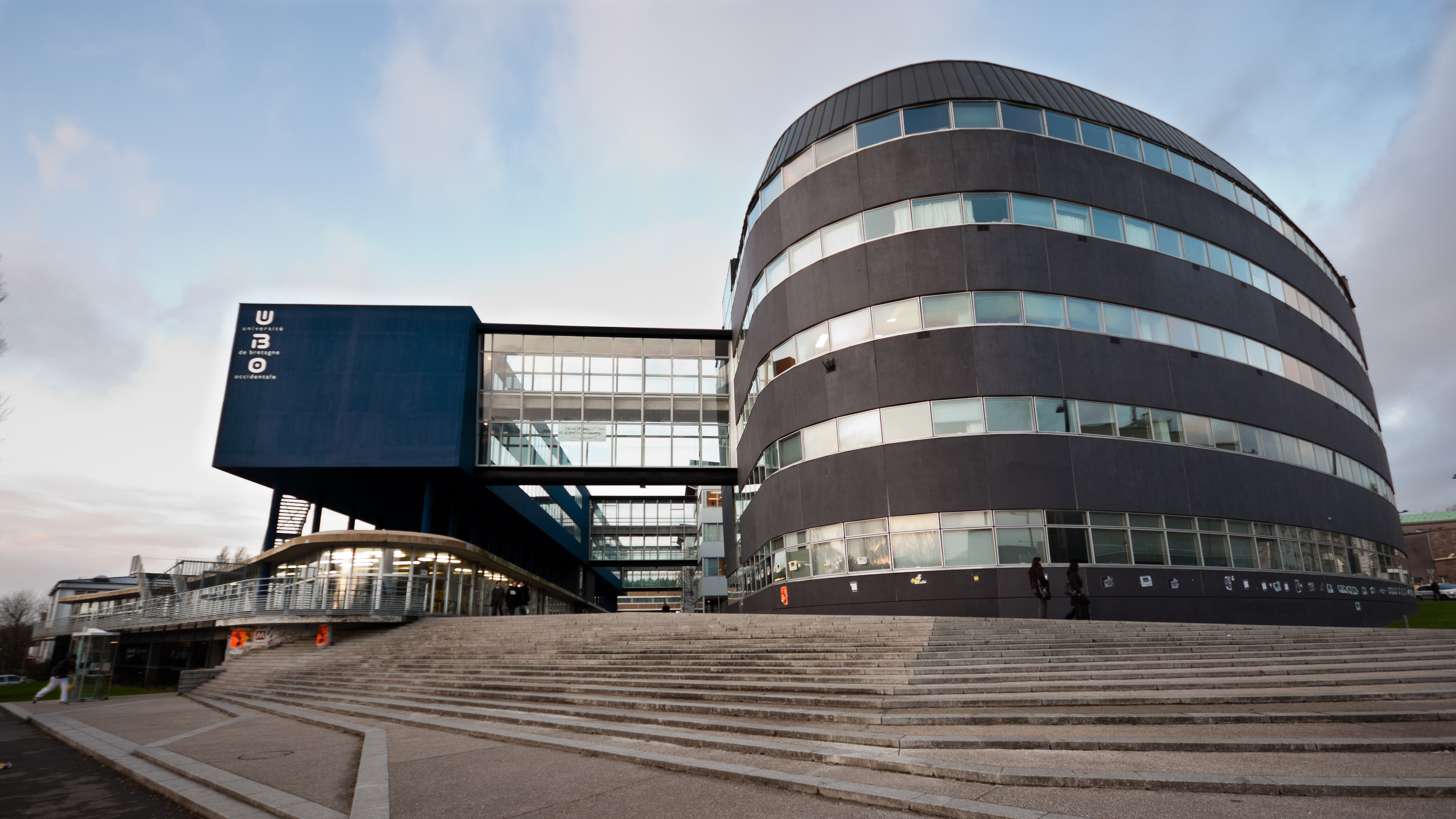
Université de Bretagne Occidentale (University of Western Brittany)

Primarily the research centre of western Brittany, Brest and its surrounding area is the home of several research and elite educational establishments:

- a multidisciplinary university, Université de Bretagne Occidentale (UBO)
- Brest has also several grandes écoles and other undergraduate or graduate schools:
  - École nationale d'ingénieurs de Brest (ENIB) (in Plouzané next to Brest)
  - Télécom Bretagne (ENST Bretagne) (in Plouzané next to Brest)
  - École nationale supérieure de techniques avancées de Bretagne (ENSTA Bretagne, formerly ENSIETA)
  - Institut supérieur de l'électronique et du numérique de Brest (ISEN Brest)
  - Brest Business School (ESC Bretagne Brest)
  - École Navale (French Naval Academy) (in Lanvéoc next to Brest)
  - To be noted that Brest is one of the hosts for the Indiana University Honors Foreign Language Program
- Brest has several research organisations:
  - the largest Ifremer (French Research Institute for Exploitation of the Sea) centre (in Plouzané next to Brest); about 1000 people work there.
  - Le Cedre (Centre of Documentation, Research and Experimentation on Accidental Water Pollution)
  - the French Polar Institute (in Plouzané next to Brest)
  - The Naval Hydrographic and Oceanographic Service (SHOM)

== Notable people ==
Brest was the birthplace of:

- Jean-Michel Huon de Kermadec (1748–1792), navigator
- Charles-Alexandre Léon Durand Linois (1761–1848), admiral during the time of Napoleon Bonaparte
- Antoinette Lemonnier (1787–1866), operatic soprano
- Prosper Garnot (1794–1838), surgeon and naturalist
- Léon Moreau (1870–1946), composer
- Victor Segalen (1878–1919), naval doctor, ethnographer, archeologist, writer and poet
- Jean Cras (1879–1932), French composer and career naval officer
- Georges Thierry d'Argenlieu (1889–1964), priest, diplomat and French Navy officer and admiral
- Jean Loysel (1889–1962), composer and lyricist
- Alain Robbe-Grillet (1922–2008), writer and filmmaker
- Pierre Brice (1929–2015), actor
- Béatrice Dalle (born 1964), actress
- Christophe Miossec (born 1964), singer
- Benoît Hamon (born 1967), MEP and French presidential candidate, Parti Socialiste, 2017
- Yann Tiersen (born 1970), minimalist multi-instrumentalist/musician
- Sébastien Flute (born 1972), Olympic gold medalist
- Benoît Menut (born 1977), composer
- Yohann Boulic (born 1978), footballer
- Larsen Touré (born 1984), footballer (naturalized Guinean)
- Gonzalo Higuaín (born 1987), footballer (naturalized Argentine)
- Laury Thilleman (born 1991), Miss France 2011

== International relations ==
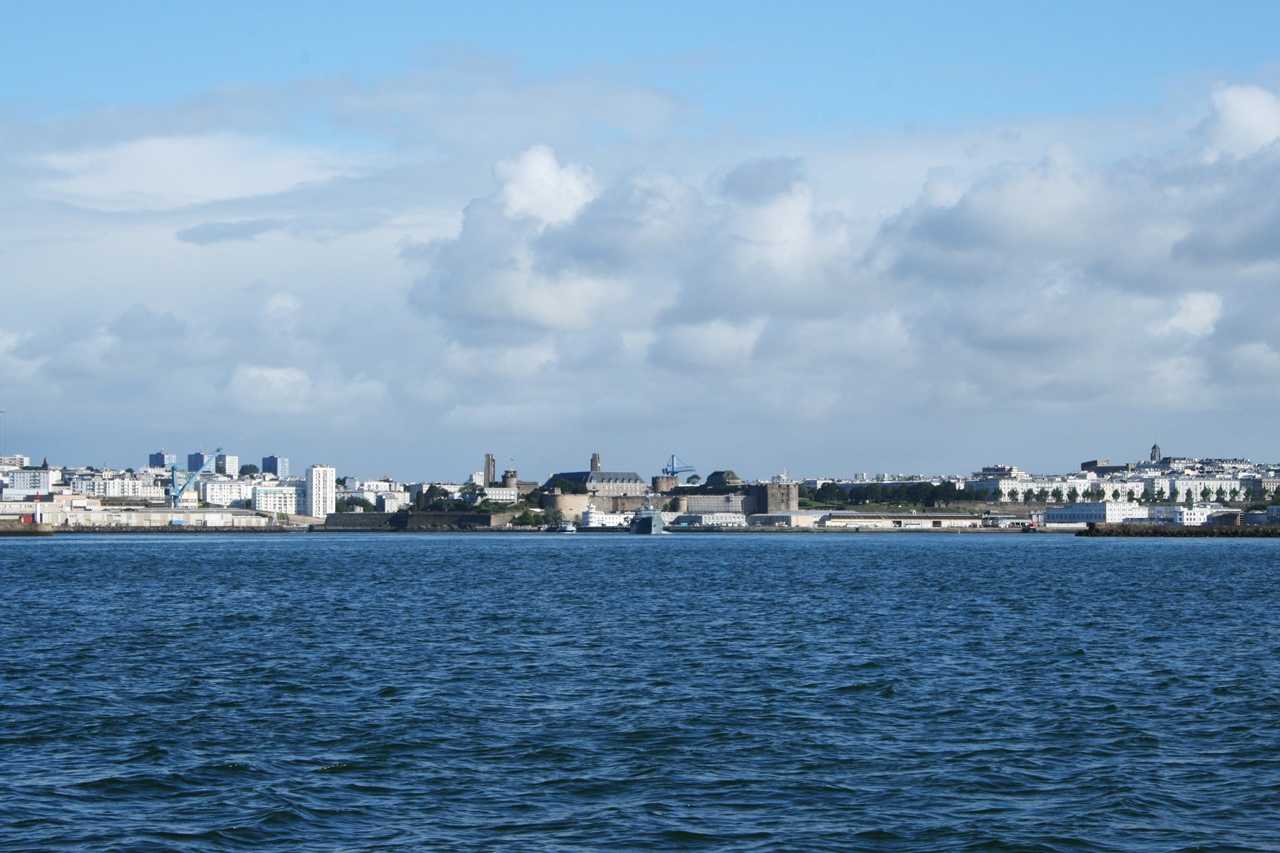
The entrance to the harbour of Brest

=== Twin towns – Sister cities ===
Brest is twinned with:

- Denver, Colorado, United States (1948)
- (United Kingdom) Plymouth, Devon, England (1963)
- Kiel, Germany (1964)
- Taranto, Italy (1964)
- Yokosuka, Kanagawa, Kantō, Japan (1970)
- Dún Laoghaire, Republic of Ireland (1984)
- Cádiz, Spain (1986)
- Saponé, Burkina Faso (1989)
- Constanța, Romania (1993)
- Qingdao, China (2006)
- Brest, Belarus (2012)

=== Friendly relationship ===
Brest has an official friendly relationship (protocole d'amitié) with:

- Bejaïa, Algeria (1995)

Panorama from the Recouvrance bridge of the castle and the Tanguy tower

== See also ==
- Battle for Brest
- Calvary at Plougastel-Daoulas
- Communes of the Finistère department
- Questel Fort
- Saint-Louis de Brest Church
- Saint-Sauveur Church in Brest
