= Alfred Chupin =

French politician (1916–2021)

Member of the French National Assembly
- In office 1 June 1951 – 1 December 1955
- Constituency: Finistère

Mayor of Brest
- In office 26 October 1947 – 5 September 1953
- Preceded by: Jules Lullien
- Succeeded by: Yves Jaouen

Personal details
- Born: 13 August 1916 Brest, France
- Died: 26 July 2021 (aged 104) Formentera, Spain
- Party: RPF; USDR; RGR

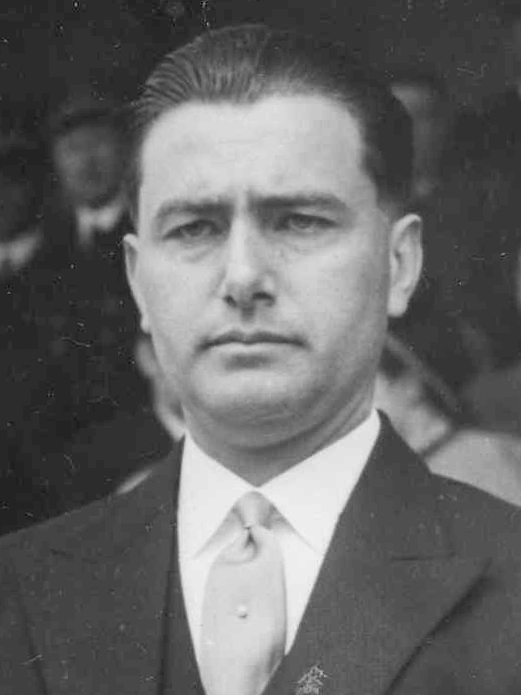
Alfred Chupin, mayor of Brest.

Alfred Pierre Marie Chupin (13 August 1916 – 26 July 2021) was a French politician.

== Biography ==
The son of a trader in Brest, Chupin trained as an engineer and became a pilot in the French Air Force. He owned a plumbing and heating business prior to entering politics, inspired by Charles de Gaulle.

Chupin was elected Mayor of Brest in 1947, following the great success by other Rally of the French People (RPF) politicians. He was re-elected in 1950, although his second term was marred by the death of Édouard Mazé, an opponent who was killed during a demonstration harshly repressed by the police on 17 April 1950. In 1951, he was elected to the National Assembly for Finistère, still a member of the RPF. During his mandate, he moved to the centre-left and joined the Democratic and Socialist Union of the Resistance (USDF) following the dissolution of the RPF in 1953. That year, he failed to be re-elected as Mayor of Brest, losing to Popular Republican Movement candidate Yves Jaouen.

Chupin supported Pierre Mendès France and his policies, moving further away from his previous Gaullist ideals with his support of the Treaty establishing the European Defence Community.

In 1956, Chupin lost his seat in the National Assembly, earning only 3.2% of the vote. He never returned to politics.

Alfred Chupin died in Formentera on 26 July 2021 at the age of 104.
