= Yohann Boulic =

French professional footballer (born 1978)

Personal information
- Date of birth: 5 May 1978 (age 48)
- Place of birth: Brest, France
- Height: 1.77 m (5 ft 10 in)
- Position: Goalkeeper

Youth career
- 1997–2000: Brest

Senior career*
Years	Team	Apps	(Gls)
2000–2004	Brest		
2005–2007	Concarneau		
2007–2009	Brest	2	(0)
2009–2010	Quimper		

International career
2008–?	Brittany	0	(0)
Medal record
Representing Stade Brestois 29
Gold medal – first place	Championnat de France amateur	CFA Group D
- * Club domestic league appearances and goals

Yohann Boulic (born 5 May 1978) is a French former professional footballer who played as a goalkeeper. He played on the professional level in Ligue 2 for Brest.

== Club career ==
Boulic played one game for Concarneau. The game, against FC Red Star Saint-Ouen, finished in a 2-0 win for the Paris-based side.

== International career ==
Boulic was called up for the Brittany national football team, a team that is not affiliated to FIFA nor UEFA nor the NF-Board in May 2008 for a friendly game against Congo at Stade Fred Aubert in Saint-Brieuc. The game 3–1 to the French side.

== Career statistics ==
Season	Club	Country	Competition	Matches	Goals	Yellow card	Red card
2000–01	Brest	France	National	1	0	0	0
2001–02	Brest	France	National	3	0	0	0
2002–03	Brest	France	National	3	0	0	0
2003–04	Brest	France	National			1	0
2004–05	Brest	France	Ligue 2	0	0	0	0
2005–06	Concarneau	France	CFA			0	0
2006–07	Concarneau	France	CFA	2	0	0	0
2007–08	Brest	France	Ligue 2	2	0	0	0
2008–09	Brest	France	Ligue 2	0	0	0	0
2009-10	Quimper	France	CFA	31	0	2	0
2010-11	Plouzane ACF	France	DH			0	0
Total							

Updated 2 May 2010
