= Hôtel de Ville, Brest =

Town hall in Brest, France

Hôtel de Ville
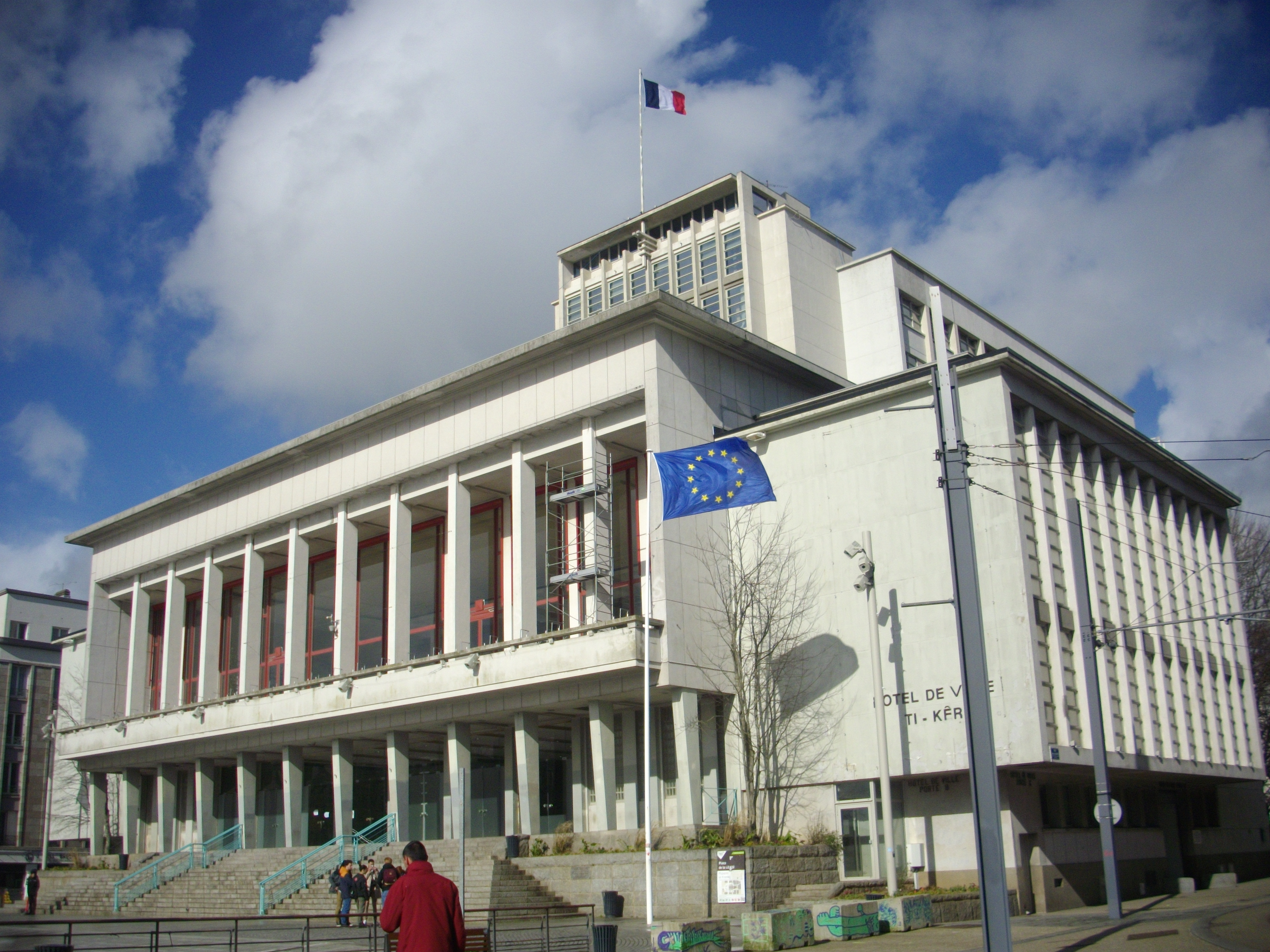
- The main frontage of the Hôtel de Ville in March 2020
- Interactive map of the Hôtel de Ville area

General information
- Type: City hall
- Architectural style: Brutalist style
- Location: Brest, France
- Coordinates: 48.3913°N 4.4851°W
- Completed: 1961

Design and construction
- Architect: Maurice Léon Génin

The Hôtel de Ville (French pronunciation: [otɛl də vil], City Hall) is a municipal building in Brest, Finistère, northwest France, standing on the Place de la Liberté.

== History ==
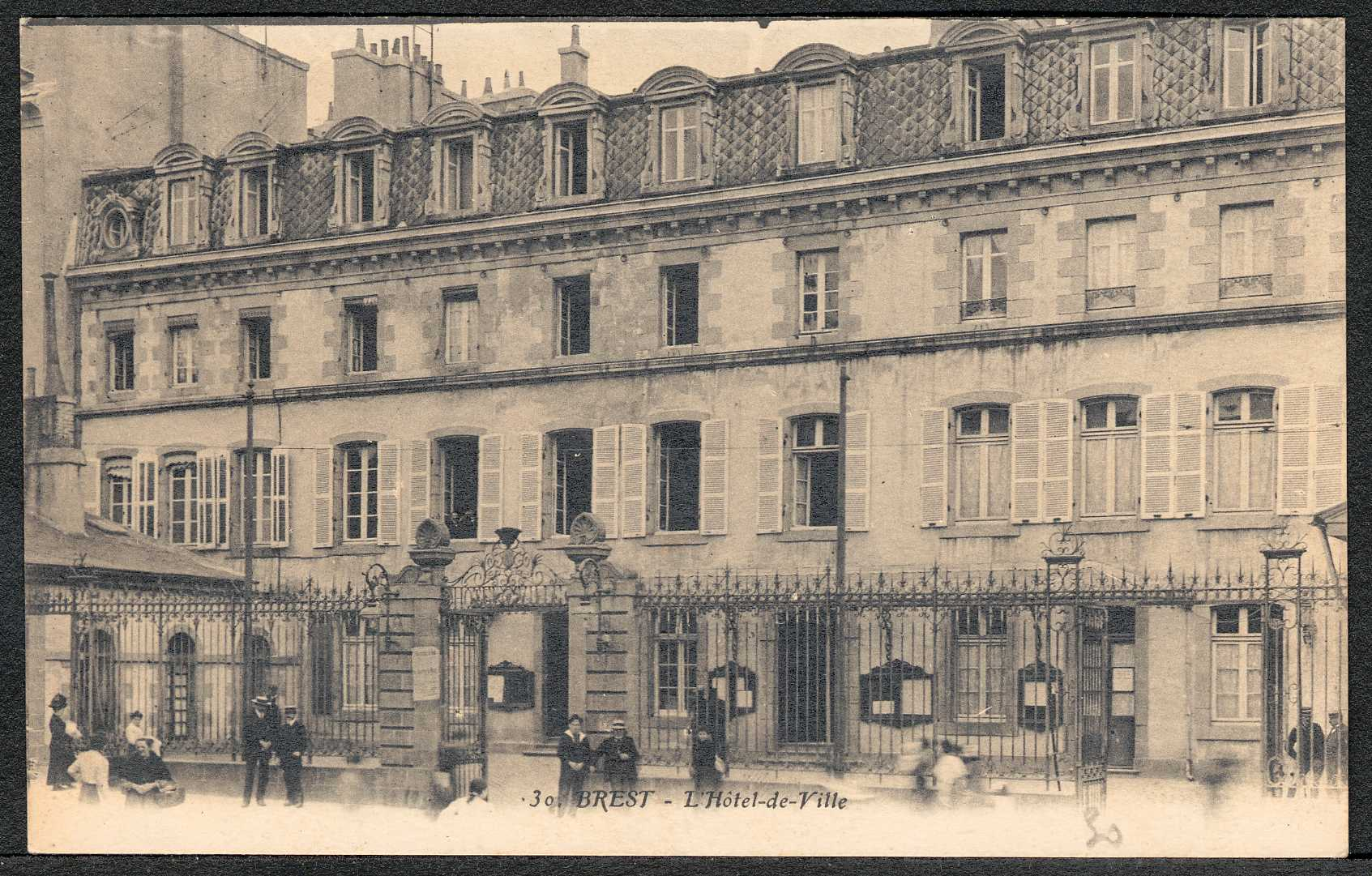
The old town hall

Until the mid-18th century, the local council held their meetings in rented rooms. However, in June 1757, the council acquired the l'hôtel Chapizeau on Rue de Lyon from Marguerite Gouin de Chapizeau. The building had been commissioned by Chapizeau's father in around 1710. The design involved a 12-bay main frontage facing onto Rue de Lyon. It incorporated doorways in many of the openings on the ground floor and was fenestrated with segmental headed windows with shutters on the first floor, square headed windows on the second floor, and a series of dormer windows with segmental pediments at attic level.

The old town hall was completely destroyed, along with much of the rest of the city centre, during the Battle for Brest when the US VIII Corps stormed the city in September 1944, during the Second World War. After the war, the council used temporary huts in the garden of the Little Sisters of the Poor in Rue Malakoff, while they waited for a new town hall to become available. The site they selected for the new building had formed a sloping section of the old ramparts of the town.

The foundation stone for the new building was laid by the president of the Senate, Gaston Monnerville, in the presence of the mayor, Yves Jaouen, on 10 May 1958. It was designed by Maurice Léon Génin in the Brutalist style, built in reinforced concrete and glass and was officially opened by the secretary of state for finance, Valéry Giscard d'Estaing, in the presence of the mayor, Georges Lombard, on 18 December 1961.

The design involved a public-facing civic block of 11 bays facing onto Place de la Liberté, with an eight-storey municipal tower behind. The civic block featured a flight of steps leading up to a recessed plate glass wall with two glass doorways; there were 11 piers supporting the first-floor structure which was projected forward and contained the main civic reception room, the Salon Richelieu (named after Cardinal Richelieu, who established the naval harbour in the town). The bays on the first floor were also fenestrated by plate glass, flanked by 12 more piers which supported a parapet and prominent eaves. The municipal tower behind was hollow, allowing the municipal archives to be stored in the central well.

In November 1987, the then Prime Minister of France, Jacques Chirac, spoke at the town hall, and, in October 1971, the president of France, Georges Pompidou, gave a speech there during a visit, which also involved an inspection of the new French submarine, Redoutable at Île Longue.
