= Traou Mad =

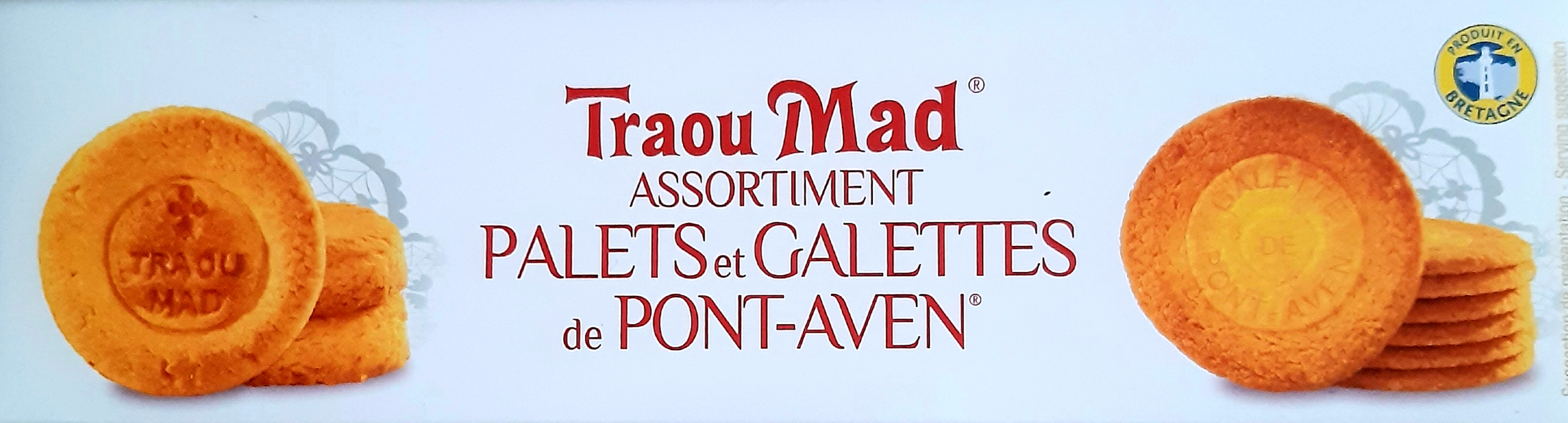
- Type: Butter cookie
- Place of origin: France
- Region or state: Pont-Aven, Brittany

Traou Mad is a French full fat butter cookie produced in Pont-Aven, Brittany. Traoù Mat (in peurunvan orthography) stands for Good Things in Breton.

Traou Mad is a registered trademark.

== See also ==
- Shortbread
