= Saint-Sauveur Church in Brest =

Church in Brest, France

Saint-Saviour Church
- Église Saint-Sauveur de Recouvrance
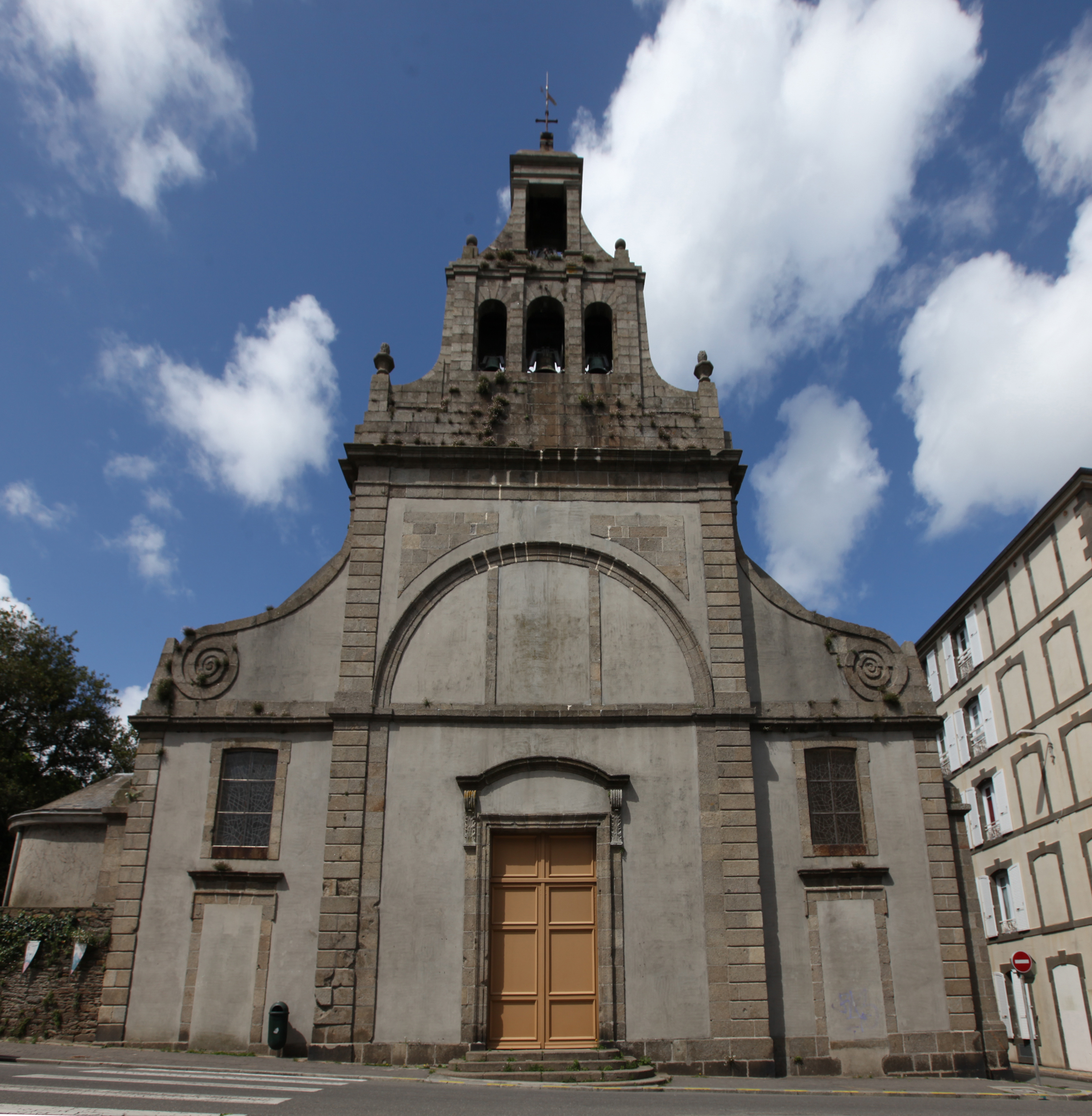
- Facade of the church

Religion
- Affiliation: Roman Catholic
- District: Recouvrance
- Region: Brittany
- Ecclesiastical or organizational status: Parish church
- Governing body: Diocese of Quimper

Location
- Location: Brest, Finistère, France
- Municipality: Brest
- Country: France
- Interactive map of Saint-Saviour Church
- Coordinates: 48.382143°N 4.501283°W

Architecture
- Architect: Amédée François Frézier
- Type: Church
- Style: Jesuit
- Groundbreaking: 1740
- Completed: 1749

The Saint-Saviour Church in Brest (Breton: Iliz Sant-Salver e Brest) is a Jesuit-style church located in the Recouvrance district of Brest, France, constructed between 1740 and 1749.

== History of the chapels in Recouvrance ==
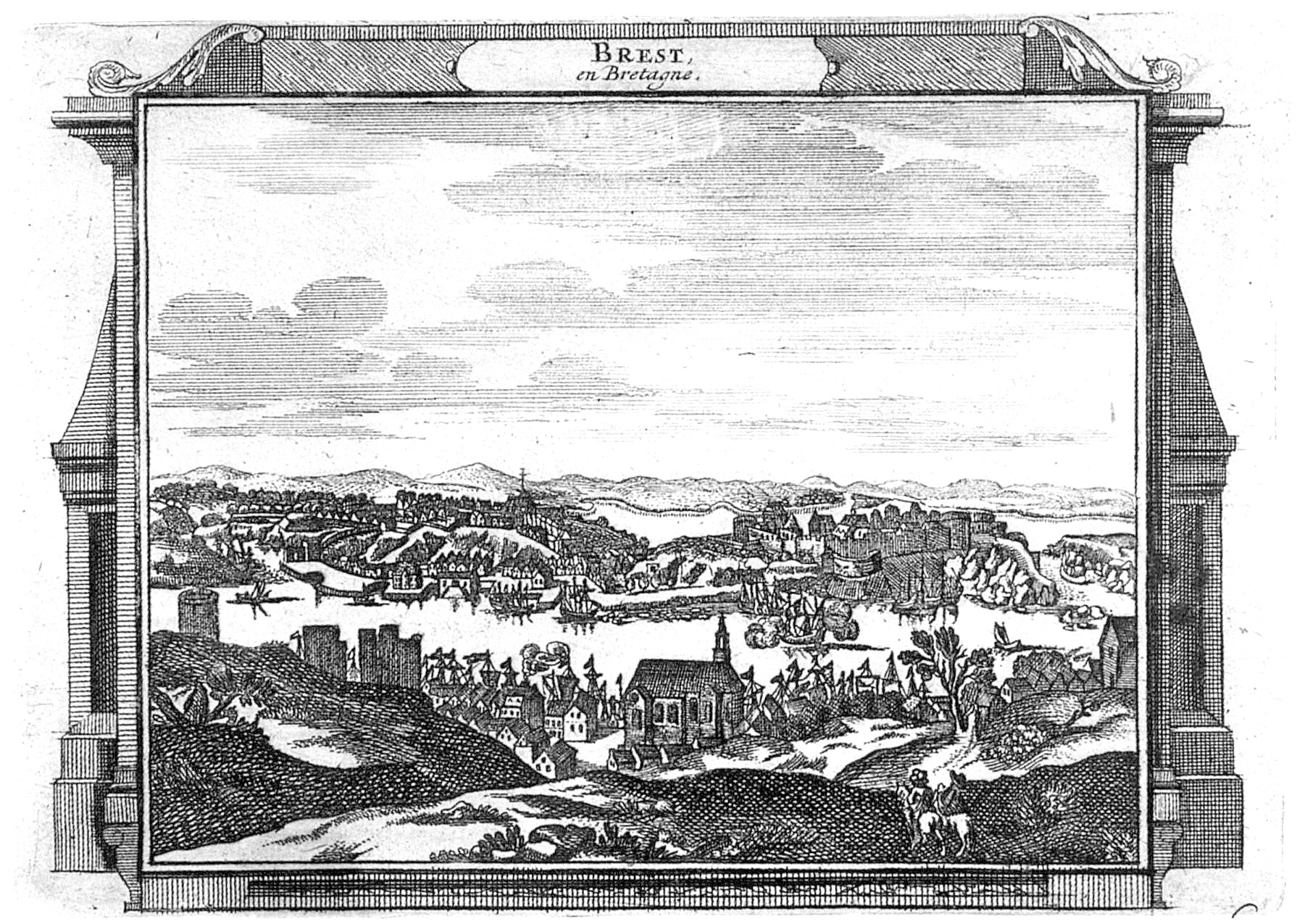
The Sainte-Catherine chapel in the heart of the Recouvrance district

In the Recouvrance district, the du Chastel family, local lords, built a chapel dedicated to Saint Catherine of Alexandria during the late Middle Ages. This chapel was situated along the banks of the Penfeld River, near the present-day Jean-Bart gate of the Brest Arsenal.

In 1346, John IV of Montfort founded the Notre-Dame-de-Recouvrance chapel in the village of Sainte-Catherine. The chapel's name, meaning "Our Lady of Recovery," reflected its role as a site where sailors and their families offered ex-votos to pray for the safe return of ships departing from Brest.

By the late 17th century, the Notre-Dame-de-Recouvrance chapel had become too small to accommodate the growing population. In 1679, the residents of Recouvrance initiated the construction of a new chapel dedicated to Saint Saviour. The project was undertaken by a contractor who employed unemployed dockworkers from the port. However, these workers, more skilled in shipbuilding and repair than masonry, produced a structurally unsound building. Nicknamed "the church of wasted time," this chapel was demolished in 1724 due to its poor construction.

== The current church ==
The present-day Saint-Saviour Church was designed by Amédée François Frézier, a noted French engineer and architect. Construction took place between 1740 and 1749. On May 16, 1750, Gouyon de Vaudurant, bishop of the Diocese of Léon, elevated the chapel to the status of a parish church, separating it from the parish of Saint-Pierre-Quilbignon.

The church, built in a simple Jesuit style due to limited resources, features a nave with nine bays and side aisles. The gable facade is adorned with a full semicircular arch. Having sustained minimal damage during World War II, it remains the oldest surviving church in Brest.

A notable feature is the statue of Notre-Dame de Recouvrance, located above the right lateral altar, crafted by the sculptor Yves Collet. In the church courtyard, a commemorative monument made of Kersanton stone stands, topped with a kneeling statue attributed to Yann Larc'hantec, though its dedication to the abbé Y. M. Queinnec lacks verification.

== Gallery ==
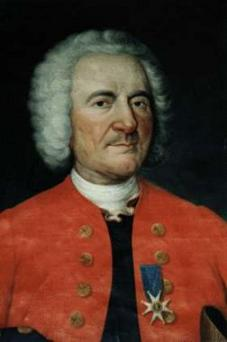
Amédée François Frézier, architect of the church

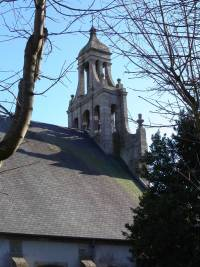
Bell tower of Saint-Saviour Church

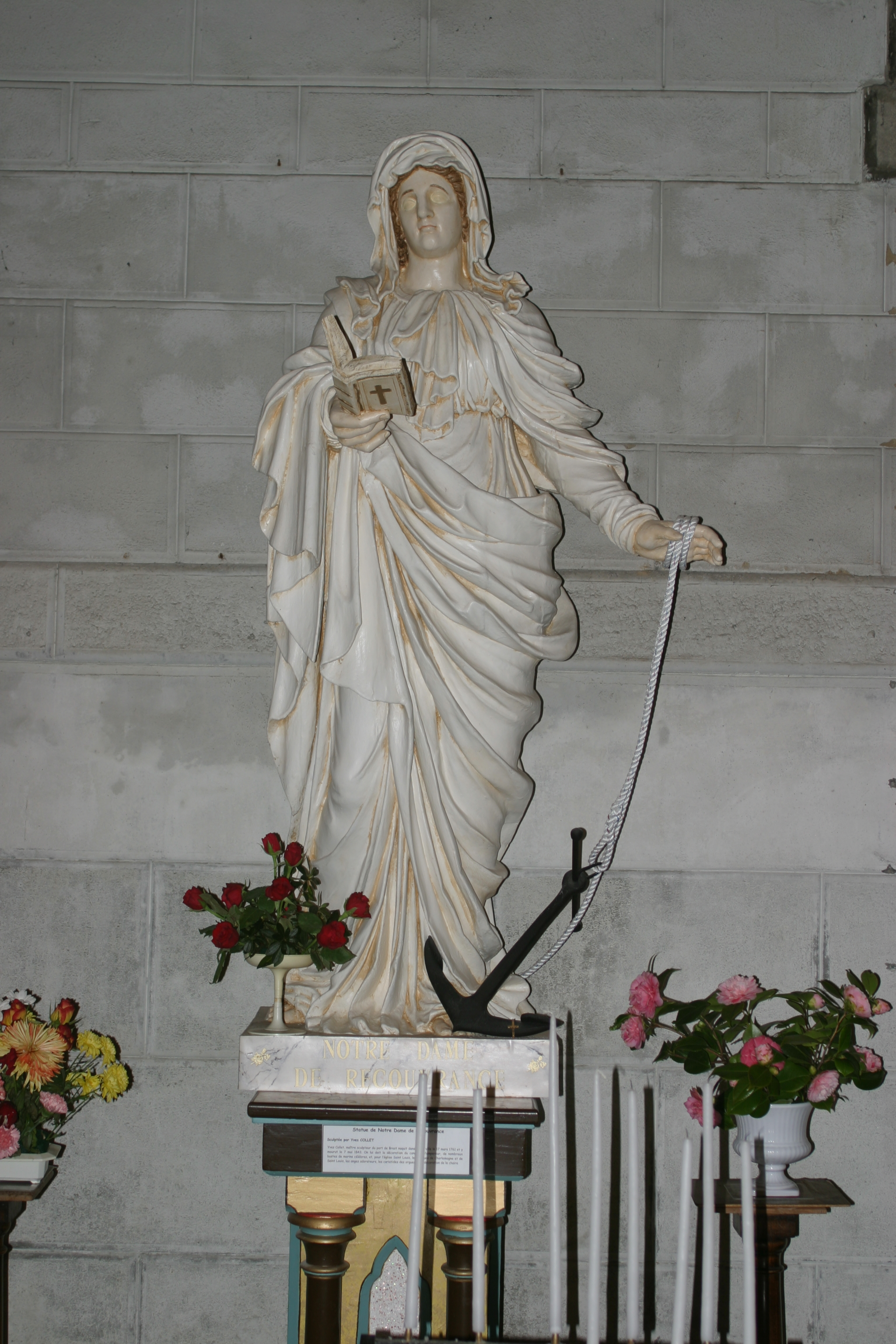
Statue of Notre-Dame de Recouvrance by Yves Collet

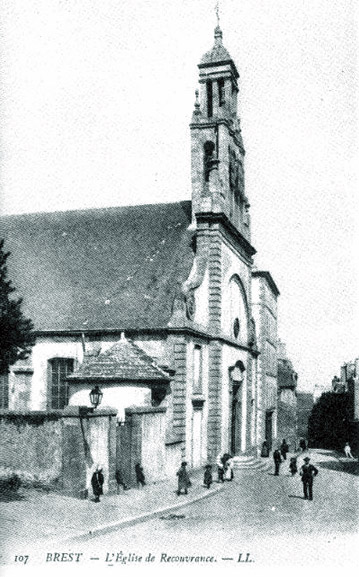
View of the church from Place Ronarc'h in the early 20th century

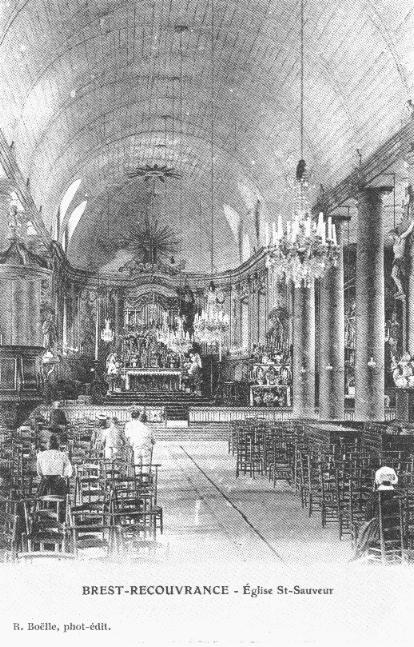
Interior view of the church in the early 20th century

== See also ==
- Amédée François Frézier
- Brest, Finistère
- Diocese of Quimper
- History of Brittany
- Recouvrance
