= Canton of Brest-2 =

Coordinates: 48.39°N 4.49°W

The canton of Brest-2 is an administrative division of the Finistère department, northwestern France. It was created at the French canton reorganisation which came into effect in March 2015. Its seat is in Brest.

It consists of the following communes:

1. Brest (partly)
