= Fort St. Michael (disambiguation) =

Fort St. Michael was a US Army installation in St. Michael, Alaska.

Fort St. Michael may also refer to:

- St. Michael Fort, a fort in Ugljan, Croatia
- Fort Saint Michael, a Hospitaller fort in Senglea, Malta
- Fortress of São Miguel, a Portuguese fort in Luanda, Angola
- Fort Sint-Michiel, a Spanish fort in Venlo, the Netherlands
- Fort San Miguel, a Spanish fort in Vancouver Island, Canada

== See also ==
- St. Michael's Fortress, a fort near Šibenik, Croatia
