= List of shipwrecks in February 1833 =

The list of shipwrecks in February 1833 includes ships sunk, foundered, grounded, or otherwise lost during February 1833.

== 1 February ==
List of shipwrecks: 1 February 1833
| Ship | State | Description |
|---|---|---|
| Susannah and Jane | United Kingdom | The ship was wrecked on the Blackwater Bank, in the Irish Sea off Wexford. |

== 2 February ==
List of shipwrecks: 2 February 1833
| Ship | State | Description |
|---|---|---|
| Amiable Adèle | France | The schooner sprang a leak and foundered in the English Channel with the loss of her captain. Her three crew were rescued by HMS Salamander (Royal Navy). Amiable Adéle was on a voyage from Bordeaux, Gironde to Dunkirk, Nord. |
| Anne | United Kingdom | The ship was driven ashore and wrecked at Ballyheigue, County Kerry with the loss of seven of her eight crew. She was on a voyage from Liverpool, Lancashire to Limerick. |
| Mountaineer | United Kingdom | The ship was wrecked on the Seaton Rock, off the coast of Northumberland. Her crew were rescued. |
| Wanderer | United Kingdom | The schooner was wrecked at Leith, Lothian with the loss of one of her seven crew. She was on a voyage from Bordeaux, Gironde, France to Leith. |

== 3 February ==
List of shipwrecks: 3 February 1833
| Ship | State | Description |
|---|---|---|
| Packet | United Kingdom | The ship was wrecked on the West Hoyle Bank, in Liverpool Bay with the loss of three of her crew. She was on a voyage from Dundalk, County Louth to Liverpool, Lancashire. |
| Mariner | United Kingdom | The ship was wrecked near Scilla, Calabria, Kingdom of the Two Sicilies. She was on a voyage from Rio de Janeiro, Brazil to Trieste. |
| Young John | United Kingdom | The ship was run down and sunk by Journeyman in the North Sea. Her crew were rescued. Young John was on a voyage from Aberdeen to Sunderland, County Durham. |

== 4 February ==
List of shipwrecks: 4 February 1833
| Ship | State | Description |
|---|---|---|
| Ashburton | United Kingdom | The ship was driven ashore at Shoreham-by-Sea, Sussex. |
| Freeman | United Kingdom | The ship ran aground on the Mowbray Sands. She capsized and sank as the tide went out. Freeman was on a voyage from Maryport, Cumberland to Annan, Dumfriesshire. |
| Redligheden | Sweden | The ship was driven ashore and wrecked on Vlieland, Friesland, Netherlands. Her crew were rescued. She was on a voyage from Gothenburg to Jersey, Channel Islands. |

== 5 February ==
List of shipwrecks: 5 February 1833
| Ship | State | Description |
|---|---|---|
| Hibernia | United Kingdom | A fire in the South Atlantic (4°40′S 20°30′W) destroyed Hibernia with substantial loss of life. |

== 7 February ==
List of shipwrecks: 7 February 1833
| Ship | State | Description |
|---|---|---|
| John | United Kingdom | The wherry was wrecked on Hilbre Island, Cheshire with the loss of one of her two crew. |
| John and Mary | United Kingdom | The smack was wrecked at Porthleven, Cornwall. Her crew were rescued. She was on a voyage from Cork to Plymouth, Devon. |

== 8 February ==
List of shipwrecks: 8 February 1833
| Ship | State | Description |
|---|---|---|
| Diamond | United Kingdom | The ship foundered in the Irish Sea off Point Lynas, Anglesey. Her crew were rescued. She was on a voyage from Wexford to Liverpool, Lancashire. |
| Elizabeth and Jane | United Kingdom | The ship foundered in the Bristol Channel off Minehead, Somerset. Her crew were rescued. She was on a voyage from Swansea, Glamorgan to Bridgwater, Somerset. |

== 9 February ==
List of shipwrecks: 9 February 1833
| Ship | State | Description |
|---|---|---|
| Eliza | United Kingdom | The ship was wrecked at Valparaíso, Chile. She was on a voyage from Otaheite to Valparaíso. |
| Finsbury | United Kingdom | The whaler was wrecked on a reef in the Pacific Ocean (5°02′S 159°19′E). Her crew survived. |
| Mary and Wemyss | United Kingdom | The ship capsized in a squall. Her crew were rescued. She was on a voyage from Wilmington, Delaware, United States to Saint John, New Brunswick, British North America. |
| Sarah | United Kingdom | The Thames barge sank in the River Thames at Grays Thurrock, Essex with the loss of three lives. |
| Thetis | Belgium | The ship was wrecked at the mouth of the Gironde river. She was on a voyage from Ostend, West Flanders to Bordeaux, Gironde, France. |

== 10 February ==
List of shipwrecks: 10 February 1833
| Ship | State | Description |
|---|---|---|
| Crescent | United Kingdom | The ship was driven ashore west of Boulogne, Pas-de-Calais, France.. Her crew were rescued. She was on a voyage from Exeter, Devon to Sunderland, County Durham. |
| Eliza | United Kingdom | The ship was driven ashore at Pennington, Hampshire. She was refloated on 15 February and taken in to Cowes, Isle of Wight. |
| Huddleston | United Kingdom | The ship foundered in the North Sea off Robin Hoods Bay, Yorkshire. Her crew were rescued. She was on a voyage from Sunderland, County Durham to Bridlington, Yorkshire. |
| Neptune | United Kingdom | The ship was driven ashore and damaged at Cardiff, Glamorgan. Her crew were rescued. She was on a voyage from Gloucester to Portsmouth, Hampshire. Neptune was refloated the next day and taken in to Cardiff, where she sank. She was subsequently wrecked on 20 February. |
| Renown | United Kingdom | The ship departed from the Charente for Leith, Lothian. She subsequently foundered off the Île de Ré with the loss of all hands. |

== 11 February ==
List of shipwrecks: 11 February 1833
| Ship | State | Description |
|---|---|---|
| Avon | (United Kingdom of Great Britain and Ireland) Western Australia | The ship was driven ashore and wrecked on Carnac Island. Her crew were rescued. |
| Rosella | United States | The ship was wrecked 16 nautical miles (30 km) north of Figueira da Foz, Portugal. Her crew were rescued. She was on a voyage from Baltimore, Maryland to Gibraltar. |

== 12 February ==
List of shipwrecks: 12 February 1833
| Ship | State | Description |
|---|---|---|
| Countess of Elgin | United Kingdom | The ship was driven into another vessel and wrecked in a gale at Greenwich, kent. |

== 13 February ==
List of shipwrecks: 13 February 1833
| Ship | State | Description |
|---|---|---|
| Achilles | United Kingdom | The ship was driven ashore in Deadmans Bay. She was on a voyage from Odesa to Liverpool, Lancashire. |
| Ellen | United Kingdom | The ship departed form London for São Miguel, Azores, Portugal. No further trace, presumed foundered with the loss of all hands. |
| Triton | United Kingdom | The brig was run down and sunk in the North Sea off Seaham, County Durham by Triune (United Kingdom). Her crew were rescued. |

== 14 February ==
List of shipwrecks: 14 February 1833
| Ship | State | Description |
|---|---|---|
| Ann | United Kingdom | The brig was driven ashore and wrecked at Irvine, Ayrshire with the loss of a crew member. |
| Browney | United Kingdom | The ship was driven ashore and wrecked on Ameland, Friesland, Netherlands. Her crew were rescued. She was on a voyage from Sunderland, County Durham to Hamburg. |
| HMS Forester | Royal Navy | The Cherokee-class brig-sloop ran aground on a reef off St Martin's, Isles of Scilly with the loss of a crew member. She was later refloated and towed to Plymouth, Devon by HMS Rhadamanthus (Royal Navy), where she was paid off in ordinary. |
| Tom Pipes | United Kingdom | The ship was driven ashore and wrecked at Torbay, Devon. |
| Union | United Kingdom | The ship was wrecked on the Gunfleet Sand, in the North Sea off the coast of Essex. Her crew were rescued. She was on a voyage from Sunderland, County Durham to Chatham, Kent. |
| Victoire | France | The ship was lost with all hands at Paimbœuf, Loire-Inférieure. |

== 15 February ==
List of shipwrecks: 15 February 1833
| Ship | State | Description |
|---|---|---|
| Auguste Virginie | France | The ship sank in Camaret Bay. |
| Augustine | France | The ship was driven ashore and wrecked at Havre de Grâce, Seine-Inférieure. She was on a voyage from Sète, Hérault to Havre de Grâce. |
| Fidelity | United Kingdom | The smack was driven against the quay at Yarmouth, Isle of Wight and wrecked. |
| Jeune Amie | France | The ship was wrecked in Camaret Bay. |
| Lydia | United States | The ship was driven ashore at New Grimsby, Tresco, Isles of Scilly, United Kingdom. |
| Providence | United Kingdom | The ship was scuttled at St Martin's, Isles of Scilly. She was on a voyage from London to Bombay, India. |
| Seine | France | The steamship was in collision with Ceres (France) at Havre de Grâce and sank. She was on a voyage from Havre de Grâce to Rouen, Seine-Inférieure. |
| HMRC Squirrel | Board of Customs | The cutter was driven ashore and wrecked at New Grimsby. |

== 16 February ==
List of shipwrecks: 16 February 1833
| Ship | State | Description |
|---|---|---|
| Isabella and Euphemia | United Kingdom | The brig was driven ashore and wrecked near "Ganthorpe Haven", Lincolnshire. |

== 17 February ==
List of shipwrecks: 17 February 1833
| Ship | State | Description |
|---|---|---|
| Elizabeth | United Kingdom | The ship was wrecked on "St. Antonio Island". She was on a voyage from Liverpool, Lancashire to Rio de Janeiro, Brazil. |

== 18 February ==
List of shipwrecks: 18 February 1833
| Ship | State | Description |
|---|---|---|
| Daniel O'Connell | United Kingdom | The ship foundered off Graigue Island, County Limerick. Her crew were rescued. |
| Friends | United Kingdom | The schooner was wrecked on the North Bank, in Liverpool Bay with the loss of all but two of her five crew. She was on a voyage from Newport, Monmouthshire to Liverpool, Lancashire. The survivors were rescued by HMRC Thetis (Board of Customs). |
| Greenwich | United Kingdom | The whaler was lost on Danes Island or in the Seychelles. Her crew were rescued. |

== 19 February ==
List of shipwrecks: 19 February 1833
| Ship | State | Description |
|---|---|---|
| Amity | United Kingdom | The ship foundered in Swansea Bay with the loss of all hands. |
| Auckland | United Kingdom | The ship was driven ashore near Beaumaris, Anglesey, or Caernarfon. She was on a voyage from Dublin to Liverpool, Lancashire. |
| Betsey | United Kingdom | The collier was driven ashore and wrecked at Dublin. Her crew were rescued. She was on a voyage from Whitehaven, Cumberland to Dublin. |
| Betsey | United Kingdom | The ship was driven ashore and damaged at Youghal, County Cork. She was refloated on 22 February and taken in to Youghal. |
| Breeze | United Kingdom | The ship foundered off Kilcrea, County Cork. |
| Castilian Maid | United Kingdom | The ship was driven ashore near Poole, Dorset. She was on a voyage from London to São Miguel, Azores, Portugal. |
| Castlemalgwyn | United Kingdom | The ship was wrecked on the Crow Rock, off the coast of Pembrokeshire. |
| Centurion | United Kingdom | The ship was driven ashore at Beaumaris, Anglesey. |
| Felicite Anna | Kingdom of Sardinia | The ship was wrecked in Castle Haven Bay, near Milford Haven, Pembrokeshire with the loss of eight of her eighteen crew. She was on a voyage from Glasgow, Renfrewshire, United Kingdom to Livorno. |
| Flora | United Kingdom | The ship was driven onto the quay at Barnstaple, Devon and severely damaged. |
| George | United Kingdom | The ship was driven ashore at Dover, Kent. |
| Grace | United Kingdom | The ship was driven ashore at Beaumaris. |
| Haddo House | United Kingdom | The ship was in collision with Briton and sank in the North Sea off the Dudgeon Lightship ( Trinity House). Her crew were rescued. Briton was severely damaged and was assisted in to Grimsby, Lincolnshire by HMRC Lapwing Board of Customs). |
| Harriet | United Kingdom | The ship was driven ashore at Ramsgate, Kent. She was on a voyage from Great Yarmouth, Norfolk to Liverpool. |
| Hope | United Kingdom | The ship was lost at São Miguel, Azores, Portugal. Her crew were rescued. |
| Horrell | United Kingdom | The ship was abandoned in the Atlantic Ocean off Ouessant, Finistère, France. She was on a voyage from Plymouth, Devon to São Miguel. |
| James | United Kingdom | The ship was driven ashore at Youghal. |
| Jane | United Kingdom | The sloop was wrecked on Rathlin Island, County Antrim. |
| Jane and Ann | United Kingdom | The ship was driven ashore and wrecked at Beaumaris, Anglesey with the loss of all three crew. She was on a voyage from Mostyn, Flintshire to Caernarfon. |
| John and Ann | United Kingdom | The ship was driven ashore at Beaumaris. |
| Prince of Saxe-Coburg | United Kingdom | The brig was run down and sunk in the English Channel off Hastings, Sussex by Minerva (United Kingdom). Her crew were rescued. |
| Prosperous | United Kingdom | The sloop was wrecked on the Mixen Rocks, in the English Channel off Littlehampton, Sussex. |
| Surprise | United Kingdom | The smack sprang a leak and foundered 1 nautical mile (1.9 km) off The Mumbles. All on board were rescued by Good Intent (United Kingdom). |
| Zisca | United Kingdom | The sloop was driven ashore on Rathlin Island. |

== 20 February ==
List of shipwrecks: 20 February 1833
| Ship | State | Description |
|---|---|---|
| Abeona | United Kingdom | The ship was driven ashore in Lulworth Cove, Dorset. She subsequently became a wreck. |
| Adams | United Kingdom | The barque was driven ashore at Cowes, Isle of Wight. She was on a voyage from London to Jamaica. |
| Badajos or Bajados | United Kingdom | The ship was driven ashore on Selsey Bill, Sussex. |
| Braddyll | United Kingdom | The ship was driven ashore and wrecked on the coast of Lancashire or Wales with some loss of life. |
| Canning | United Kingdom | The ship was driven ashore at Shoreham-by-Sea, Sussex. |
| Cheviot | United Kingdom | The smack was driven ashore and damaged near Milford Haven, Pembrokeshire. She was on a voyage from Bahia, Brazil to London. Cheviot was later refloated and taken in to Milford Haven. |
| Compact | United Kingdom | The ship was driven ashore and wrecked at Bideford, Devon. Her crew were rescued. She was on a voyage from Cork to Bideford. |
| Conceptión | Spain | The schooner was driven ashore and wrecked in Deadmans Bay. She was on a voyage from Villaviciosa, Asturias to Plymouth, Devon, United Kingdom. |
| Dart | United Kingdom | The brig was driven ashore and wrecked in Deadmans Bay. |
| Dunn | United Kingdom | The ship ran aground on the Holme Sand, in the North Sea off the coast of Essex and was abandoned by her crew. She was later refloated and taken in to Harwich, Essex. |
| Ebenezer | United Kingdom | The ship was driven ashore at Portreath with the loss of one of her crew. She was on a voyage from Newport, Monmouthshire to Topsham, Devon. Ebenezer was later refloated. |
| Elizabeth | United Kingdom | The ship was wrecked at Balbriggan, County Dublin with the loss of all hands. |
| Erin | United Kingdom | The brig was wrecked at Plymouth, Devon. Her crew were rescued by HMS Rover (Royal Navy). Her crew were rescued by HMS Rover and HMS Spartiate (both Royal Navy). She was on a voyage from Liverpool, Lancashire to Savannah, Georgia, United States. |
| Erin | United Kingdom | The steamship foundered in the Bristol Channel west of Lundy Island, Devon with the loss of all on board - 22 crew and more than 30 passengers. |
| Felicity | Kingdom of the Two Sicilies | The brig was driven ashore in Sandy Haven Bay and wrecked with the loss of six of her eighteen crew. She was on a voyage from Glasgow, Renfrewshire, United Kingdom to Palermo, Sicily and Livorno, Grand Duchy of Tuscany. |
| Fly | United Kingdom | The sloop capsized at Mawgan Porth, Cornwall with the loss of all hands. |
| Francis Anne | United Kingdom | The schooner foundered in the Bristol Channel off The Mumbles, Glamorgan with the loss of all ten or twelve people on board. She was on a voyage from Swansea, Glamorgan to Padstow, Cornwall. |
| Freedom | United Kingdom | The schooner was driven ashore and wrecked in Freshwater West Bay, near Milford Haven with the loss of four of her five crew. She was on a voyage from Newport to Cork. |
| George | United Kingdom | The ship was driven ashore and wrecked at Holyhead, Anglesey. Her crew were rescued. She was on a voyage from Whitehaven, Cumberland to Dublin. |
| George | United Kingdom | The ship was driven ashore and wrecked at Workington, Cumberland. |
| Henry | United Kingdom | The ship was wrecked near Balbriggan, County Dublin. Her crew were rescued. |
| Hopewell | United Kingdom | The ship was wrecked at Porthdinllaen, Caernarfonshire with the loss of all three crew. She was on a voyage from Caernarfon to Porthdinllaen. |
| Irton | United Kingdom | The ship was driven ashore at Tralee, County Kerry. She was refloated on 25 February. Irton was on a voyage from Limerick to Liverpool. |
| Isabella | United Kingdom | The ship was driven ashore at Eggieburn, Aberdeenshire. Her crew were rescued. She was on a voyage from St Davids, Pembrokeshire to Newburgh, Fife. |
| John and Amelia | United Kingdom | The ship was driven ashore on Selsey Bill. |
| Kitty | United Kingdom | The schooner was driven ashore west of Portreath, Cornwall with the loss of a crew member. |
| Lady Florence | United Kingdom | The ship was driven ashore and wrecked at Balbriggan. Her crew were rescued. |
| Malvina | United Kingdom | The ship sprang a leak and sank at Newport, Monmouthshire. |
| Maria | United Kingdom | The ship was driven ashore at Porthcawl, Glamorgan with the loss of all hands. She was on a voyage from Swansea to Ilfracombe, Devon. |
| Martha | United Kingdom | The brig was driven ashore and wrecked at Holyhead. Her crew were rescued. She was on a voyage from Whitehaven to Dublin. |
| Mary | United Kingdom | The ship was driven ashore and damaged at Lymington, Hampshire. |
| Mary Ann | United Kingdom | The brig was driven on to the West Hoyle Bank, in Liverpool Bay with the loss of six of her crew. She was on a voyage from Saint-Domingue to Liverpool. |
| Mary Frances | United Kingdom | The ship was wrecked on The Skerries. |
| Ma Za | United Kingdom | The ship was driven ashore and wrecked at Workington. |
| Pallion | United Kingdom | The ship was driven ashore and wrecked near Thorpeness, Suffolk. Her crew were rescued. She was on a voyage from Sunderland, County Durham to London. |
| Peace | United Kingdom | The ship was driven ashore near Arklow, County Wicklow. She was on a voyage from Workington, Cumberland to Wexford. |
| Pembroke | United Kingdom | The schooner was driven ashore and wrecked at Dunany Point, County Louth with the loss of all but her captain. She was on a voyage from Milford Haven to Dundalk, County Louth. |
| Phœnix | United Kingdom | The ship was wrecked off Inch Island, County Dublin. Her crew were rescued. |
| Princess Elizabeth | United Kingdom | The ship was driven ashore at the Codling Gap, Cheshire. She was on a voyage from Liverpool, Lancashire to Van Diemen's Land. Princess Elizabeth was refloated on 21 February and taken in to Liverpool in a severely leaky condition. |
| Resolution | United Kingdom | The ship was wrecked in Mort Bay, Devon with the loss of all but her captain. She was on a voyage from Cardiff, Glamorgan to Liverpool. |
| Sarah | United Kingdom | The ship was driven ashore and wrecked at Douglas, Isle of Man with the loss of eight of her crew. |
| Seanhoughs or Senhouse | United Kingdom | The ship was driven ashore and wrecked at Holyhead. Her crew were rescued by the Holyhead Lifeboat. |
| Speedwell | United Kingdom | The ship was driven ashore and damaged at Dublin. She was on a voyage from Newry, County Antrim to Bristol, Gloucestershire. |
| St. Peter | United Kingdom | The ship foundered off The Skerries, County Antrim with the loss of all hands. She was on a voyage from Harrington, Cumberland to Dublin. |
| Sylph | United Kingdom | The ship was driven ashore on St. Michael's Island, Isle of Man. She was refloated and taken in to Derbyhaven, Isle of Man. Sylph was on a voyage from Liverpool to South Shields, County Durham. |
| Sylph | (United Kingdom of Great Britain and Ireland) Jersey | The ship was driven ashore at Shoreham-by-Sea. |
| Tay | United Kingdom | The brig was wrecked on the Corton Sand, in the North Sea off the coast of Suffolk with the loss of two of her six crew. The survivors were rescued by the Lowestoft Lifeboat. She was on a voyage from London to Hull, Yorkshire. Name also reported as Fay', or Jay. |
| Two Brothers | United Kingdom | The ship was wrecked at Christchurch, Dorset. |
| Valentine | United Kingdom | The ship was driven ashore at Great Yarmouth, Norfolk. She was on a voyage from London to Hull. |
| Venus | United Kingdom | The ship was abandoned in the Atlantic Ocean. Her crew were rescued. She was on a voyage from British Guiana to Liverpool, Nova Scotia, British North America. |
| William and Mary | United Kingdom | The sloop foundered in the North Sea off the coast of Aberdeenshire. |
| William Penn | United States | The full-rigged ship was wrecked on the East Hoyle Bank, in Liverpool Bay. Her crew were rescued. She was on a voyage from Savannah, Georgia to Liverpool. |
| Williams | United Kingdom | The sloop was abandoned in the Irish Sea. Her three crew were rescued by HM Packet Etna (Royal Navy). |

== 21 February ==
List of shipwrecks: 21 February 1833
| Ship | State | Description |
|---|---|---|
| Aerial | United Kingdom | The brig was driven ashore on Lindisfarne, Northumberland. Her crew were rescued. |
| Brothers | United Kingdom | The ship was driven ashore and wrecked at Berwick upon Tweed, Northumberland. Her crew were rescued. She was on a voyage from Whitby, Youkshire to South Shields, County Durham. |
| Brothers | United Kingdom | The ship capsized at Chatham, Kent. She was subsequently righted. |
| Eliza | United Kingdom | The ship was driven ashore crewless between Boscastle and Bude, Cornwall. |
| Evelina Jane | United Kingdom | The ship was wrecked near Bude, Cornwall. |
| Favourite | United Kingdom | The schooner was driven ashore and wrecked near Port Eynon, Glamorgan with the loss of all hands. |
| Haddnor House | United Kingdom | The ship was in collision with Britain and foundered in the North Sea off the coast of Norfolk. |
| Isabella | United Kingdom | The ship was driven ashore and wrecked near Pevensey, Sussex. All eleven passengers and eighteen crew were rescued by the Eastbourne Lifeboat. She was on a voyage from London to Demerara. |
| John Clifton | United Kingdom | The ship was driven ashore at Baldoyle, County Dublin. |
| Mary | United Kingdom | The sloop was driven ashore and wrecked at Port Eynon with the loss of all hands. She was on a voyage from Bristol, Gloucestershire to Laugharne, Carmarthenshire. |
| Merchant | United Kingdom | The ship was driven ashore at Orford Haven, Suffolk. She was on a voyage from Newcastle upon Tyne, Northumberland to Aldeburgh, Suffolk. |
| Minerva | United Kingdom | The sloop was abandoned in the Irish Sea 25 nautical miles (46 km) south east of Lambay Island, County Dublin. Her four crew were rescued by the brig Robert (United Kingdom). |

== 22 February ==
List of shipwrecks: 22 February 1833
| Ship | State | Description |
|---|---|---|
| Catherine | United Kingdom | The ship was driven ashore and wrecked near Milford Haven, Pembrokeshire. She was on a voyage from Demerara to Liverpool. There were at least three survivors. |
| Hannah | United Kingdom | The ship was run down and sunk in the English Channel off Portland Bill, Dorset by President (United Kingdom). Her crew were rescued. |
| Hawke | United Kingdom | The ship was wrecked at Wexford. |
| Trusty | United Kingdom | The ship was wrecked near Newton with the loss of two of her crew. |
| Washington | United Kingdom | The ship was wrecked at "Popoe", on the African coast. Her crew were rescued. |

== 23 February ==
List of shipwrecks: 23 February 1833
| Ship | State | Description |
|---|---|---|
| Elizabeth | United Kingdom | The galiot ran agroundd on the North Bank, in Liverpool Bay. Her crew were rescued. She was on a voyage from Galway to Liverpool, Lancashire. Elizabeth was refloated in early March and taken in to the River Mersey. |
| Thomas | United Kingdom | The ship struck Woodcock's Ledge, off St. Mary's, Isles of Scilly and sank. She was on a voyage from Fowey, Cornwall to St. Mary's. Thomas was refloated on 11 June and beached. |

== 24 February ==
List of shipwrecks: 24 February 1833
| Ship | State | Description |
|---|---|---|
| Endeavour | United Kingdom | The ship was driven ashore on Gigha, Argyllshire. She was on a voyage from Bristol, Gloucestershire to Leith, Lothian. Endeavour floated off on 8 March and sank in deep water. |
| Margaret | United Kingdom | The ship was wrecked 15 nautical miles (28 km) west of Alexandria, Egypt.. She was on a voyage from Alexandria to Liverpool, Lancashire. |

== 25 February ==
List of shipwrecks: 25 February 1833
| Ship | State | Description |
|---|---|---|
| Felicity | United Kingdom | The barque was wrecked near Dartmouth, Devon. She was on a voyage from Liverpool, Lancashire to Savannah, Georgia, United States. |
| Ossian | United Kingdom | The ship ran aground on the Herd Sand, in the North Sea off South Shields, County Durham. |

== 26 February ==
List of shipwrecks: 26 February 1833
| Ship | State | Description |
|---|---|---|
| Robert | (United Kingdom of Great Britain and Ireland) British North America | The ship sprang a leak and foundered in the Atlantic Ocean 50 nautical miles (93 km) south east of Nantucket, Massachusetts, United States. She was on a voyage from Saint John, New Brunswick to Baltimore, Maryland, United States. |

== 27 February ==
List of shipwrecks: 27 February 1833
| Ship | State | Description |
|---|---|---|
| Shamrock | United Kingdom | The ship was wrecked in the Bayona Islands, Spain. She was on a voyage from Liverpool, Lancashire to Porto, Portugal. |
| Three Sisters | United Kingdom | The ship was driven ashore at Swansea, Glamorgan. She was on a voyage from Porthcawl, Glamorgan to Waterford. |

== 28 February ==
List of shipwrecks: 28 February 1833
| Ship | State | Description |
|---|---|---|
| Istock | Austrian Empire | The brigantine was wrecked on the "Isle of Alsh". Her crew were rescued. She was on a voyage from Montevideo, Uruguay to Havana, Cuba. |
| New Phoenix | United Kingdom | The ship ran aground on the Maplin Sand, in the North Sea off the coast of Essex. She was on a voyage from Jamaica to London. New Phoenix was later refloated and taken in to the River Thames. |

== Unknown date ==
List of shipwrecks: Unknown date 1833
| Ship | State | Description |
|---|---|---|
| Ardent | United Kingdom | The ship was wrecked near Aberystwyth, Cardiganshire. She was on a voyage from Cardiff, Glamorgan to Liverpool, Lancashire. |
| Bolina | United Kingdom | The ship was wrecked near St Davids Head, Pembrokeshire with the loss of all hands. She was om a voyage from Newport, Monmouthshire to Liverpool with iron . |
| Bolivar | United Kingdom | The ship was driven ashore near Milford Haven, Pembrokeshire. She was on a voyage from Newport, Monmouthshire to Liverpool. |
| HMS Calypso | Royal Navy | The Cherokee-class brig-sloop foundered in the Atlantic Ocean. |
| Delabella | United Kingdom | The ship was driven ashore near Bideford, Devon. She was on a voyage from Newport to Truro, Cornwall. |
| Draper | United Kingdom | The ship was driven ashore near Milford Haven. |
| Dutton | United Kingdom | The brig foundered in the North Sea off Whitby, Yorkshire before 22 February. |
| Eliza | United Kingdom | The ship foundered off Fishguard, Pembrokeshire. |
| Fletcher | United Kingdom | The ship foundered between the Silver Keys and the Square Handkerchief Reef. Six crew survived. She was on a voyage from Liverpool to New Orleans, Louisiana, United States. |
| Frederick | United Kingdom | The ship foundered off St David's Head, Pembrokeshire. She was om a voyage from Liverpool to an African port. |
| Highland Lass | United Kingdom | The ship was driven ashore near "Marrara". She was on a voyage from Terra Nova to Falmouth, Cornwall. |
| Industry | (United Kingdom of Great Britain and Ireland) British North America | The schooner was in collision with an American vessel and abandoned in the Irish sea off Holyhead, Anglesey. Her crew were rescued. The wreck was towed in to Dublin on 19 March. |
| Isabella | United Kingdom | The schooner foundered in the Bristol Channel off Lynmouth, Devon. |
| James and Maris | United Kingdom | The flat was driven ashore at Point of Ayr, Flintshire. |
| Janet | United Kingdom | The ship foundered in Rothesay Bay. She was on a voyage from Limerick to Glasgow, Renfrewshire. |
| John | United States | The ship was driven ashore and wrecked near Málaga, Spain. She was on a voyage from Livorno, Kingdom of Sardinia to New York. |
| John and Grace | United Kingdom | The ship was driven onto the Hoyle Bank, in Liverpool Bay. |
| Kent | United Kingdom | The ship was wrecked near Bude. Her crew were rescued. She was on a voyage from London to Newport. |
| Kent | United Kingdom | The ship was driven on to the West Hoyle Bank. She was on a voyage from Liverpool to Lancaster, Lancashire. Kent was later refloated. |
| Kirkcudbright Castle | United Kingdom | The ship was wrecked on the West Hoyle Bank with the loss of all hands. She was on a voyage from Dundalk, County Louth to Liverpool. |
| Levin | United Kingdom | The ship was driven ashore near Milford Haven and was scuttled. |
| Margaret | United Kingdom | The brig was driven ashore near Bideford. She was on a voyage from Newport to Youghal, County Cork. |
| Mariner | United Kingdom | The flat was driven ashore at the Point of Ayr. |
| Mary | United Kingdom | The brig was run down and sunk in the Irish Sea 20 nautical miles (37 km) east of Lambay Island, County Dublin. Her crew survived. The other vessel, a brig, also sank. |
| Mary | United Kingdom | The ship foundered in the North Sea off the coast of Norfolk on or before 22 February. |
| Mary Ann | United Kingdom | The schooner was driven ashore and wrecked near Padstow before 25 February. She was on a voyage from St. Ives to Penzance, Cornwall. |
| Mary Anne | United Kingdom | The sloop foundered in the Firth of Forth off Leith, Lothian. |
| Parkfield | United Kingdom | The ship was driven ashore and severely damaged in Douglas Bay. She was later refloated. |
| Queen Elizabeth | United Kingdom | The ship was driven ashore near Bude. She was on a voyage from Waterford to London. |
| Quorino | Netherlands | The ship was driven ashore and wrecked on "Bennequet", Finistère, France with the loss of a crew member. She was on a voyage from Çeşme, Ottoman Empire to Amsterdam, North Holland. |
| St. Catherine | France | The ship was driven ashore of the Île de Ré, Charente-Maritime. She was on a voyage from the Charente to Bristol, Gloucestershire, United Kingdom. St. Catherine was later refloated and taken into port. |
| St. George | United Kingdom | The ship foundered in the Bristol Channel off Bideford. |
| St. Louis | (United Kingdom of Great Britain and Ireland) Guernsey | The ship was driven ashore at Saint-Vaast-la-Hougue, Manche, France. She was on a voyage from Guernsey to Nantes, Loire-Inférieure, France. |
| Thomas and Mary | United Kingdom | The ship foundered off Bideford. |
| Union | United Kingdom | The schooner sprang a leak and foundered off Zennor, Cornwall. Her four crew survived |
