= John Berkeley, 3rd Baron Berkeley of Stratton =

English admiral

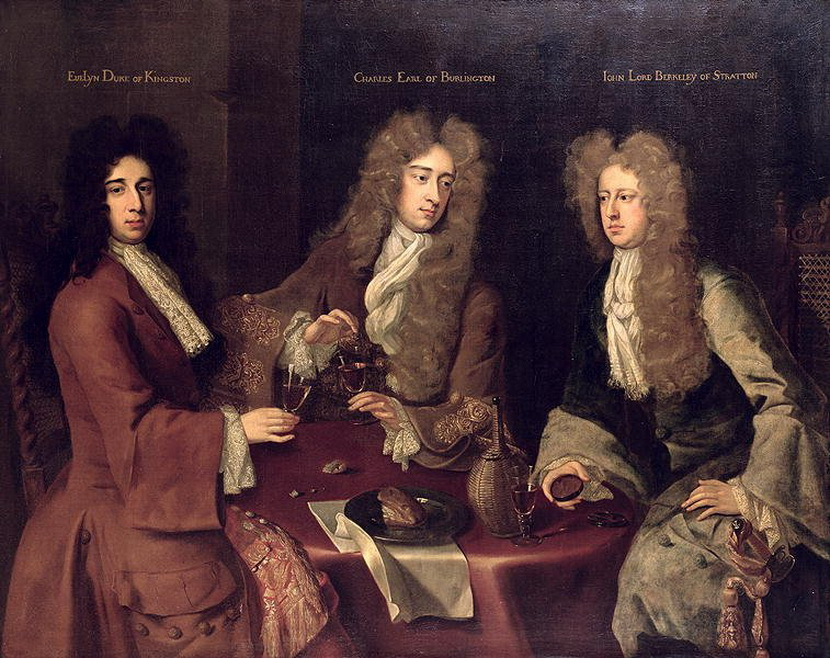
Lord Berkeley (right), together with Evelyn Pierrepont, 1st Duke of Kingston-upon-Hull and Charles Boyle, 2nd Earl of Burlington in a group portrait by Godfrey Kneller.

Admiral John Berkeley, 3rd Baron Berkeley of Stratton (1663 – 27 February 1697) was an English admiral, of the Bruton branch of the Berkeley family.

== Biography ==
He was the second son of John Berkeley, 1st Baron Berkeley of Stratton, and succeeded to the title on 6 March 1681, by the death of his elder brother Charles, a captain in the navy.

On 14 December 1688, he was nominated rear-admiral of the fleet, under the command of Lord Dartmouth. In the following summer, he was vice-admiral of the red squadron under Admiral Herbert, and fought with him in the Battle of Bantry Bay (11 May 1689). On the death of Sir John Ashby, 12 July 1693, he was appointed admiral of the Blue in the fleet under the joint admirals Killigrew, Delavall, and Shovell.

On 8 June 1694, Lord Berkeley was detached by Admiral Russell in command of a large division intended to cover the Attack on Brest by the land forces under General Talmash. Several concurring accounts had warned the French of the object of this expedition, and when the attempt was made in Camaret Bay, it was repulsed with very severe loss.

After his return from this expedition, Berkeley continued in command of the fleet, and a few days later, was again sent out to bombard Dieppe and Le Havre. On 27 August Lord Berkeley resigned the command to Sir Clowdisley Shovell, and went to London for the winter.

The next summer, 1695, Berkeley renewed the attacks on the French coast, and on 4 July, joined by a Dutch squadron under Admiral Philips van Almonde, he appeared in front of St. Malo and shelled the city for almost two days under the immediate command of Captain John Benbow. In August, Berkeley attacked Dunkirk and Calais, without success.

The next year, he sailed into the Bay of Biscay and the isle Groix and the smaller islands, Houet and Hoedic, were ravaged, and St. Martin's (isle of Ré) was bombarded. Such achievements could not lead to any result and to make things worst, one night there was an intrusion into the fleet by the French privateer René Duguay-Trouin, who overpowered one of the frigates in full view of Admiral Berkeley. By the end of July the fleet returned to Spithead, and no further operations during that summer being intended, Berkeley went on leave, still preserving the command. However, he never resumed it, being attacked by a pleurisy, of which he died on 27 February 1697.

He had married Jane Martha Temple, daughter of Sir John Temple of East Sheen in Surrey, Attorney General for Ireland, and his wife Jane Yarner, by whom he had but one daughter, who died in infancy. His widow remarried William Bentinck, 1st Earl of Portland.

Military offices
Preceded by Viscount Colchester	Colonel of Lord Berkeley's Regiment of Horse; 1692–1693	Succeeded by Cornelius Wood
Preceded by Henry Killigrew	Colonel of the 2nd Maritime Regiment; 1693–1697	Succeeded by Sir Cloudesley Shovell
Peerage of England
Preceded by Charles Berkeley	Baron Berkeley of Stratton; 1681–1697	Succeeded by William Berkeley
