= Preko =

Preko Oltre (Italian) San Michiel (Venetian)
- Municipality
- Općina Preko; Municipality of Preko
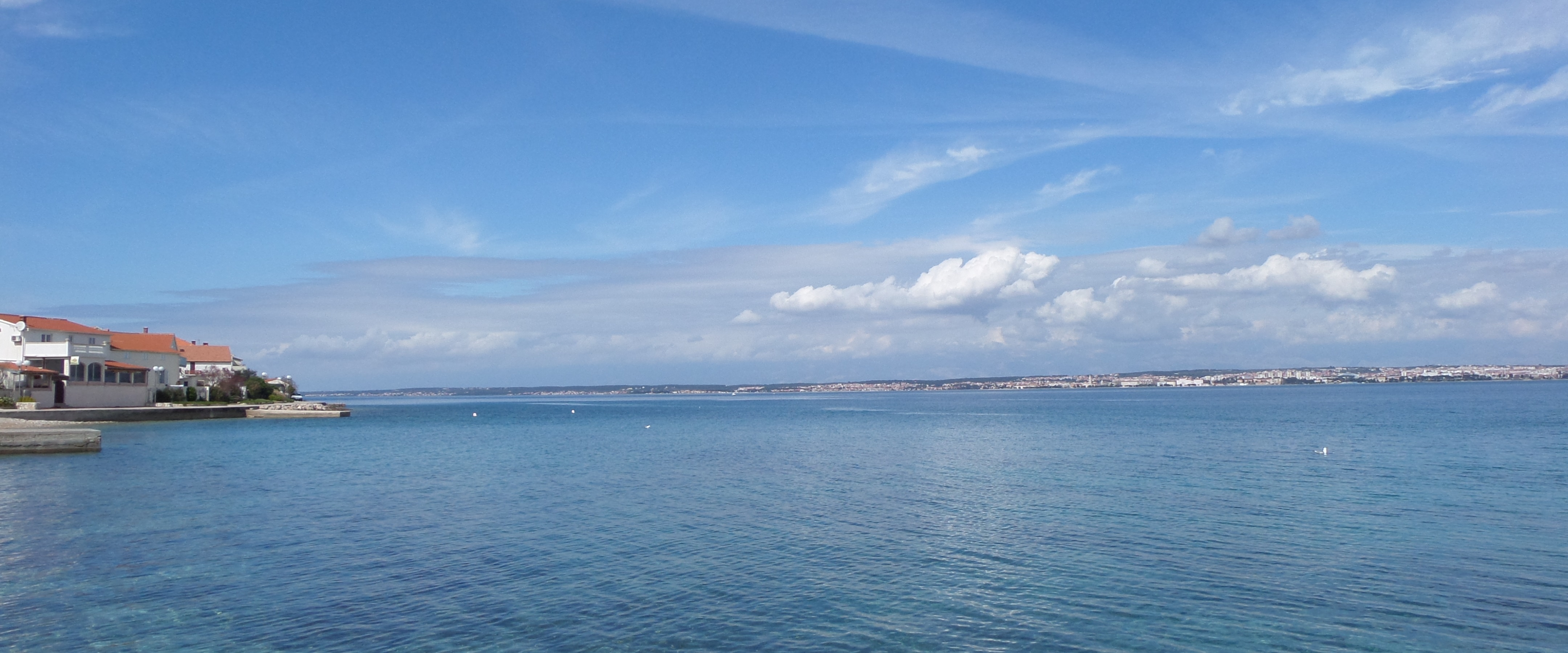
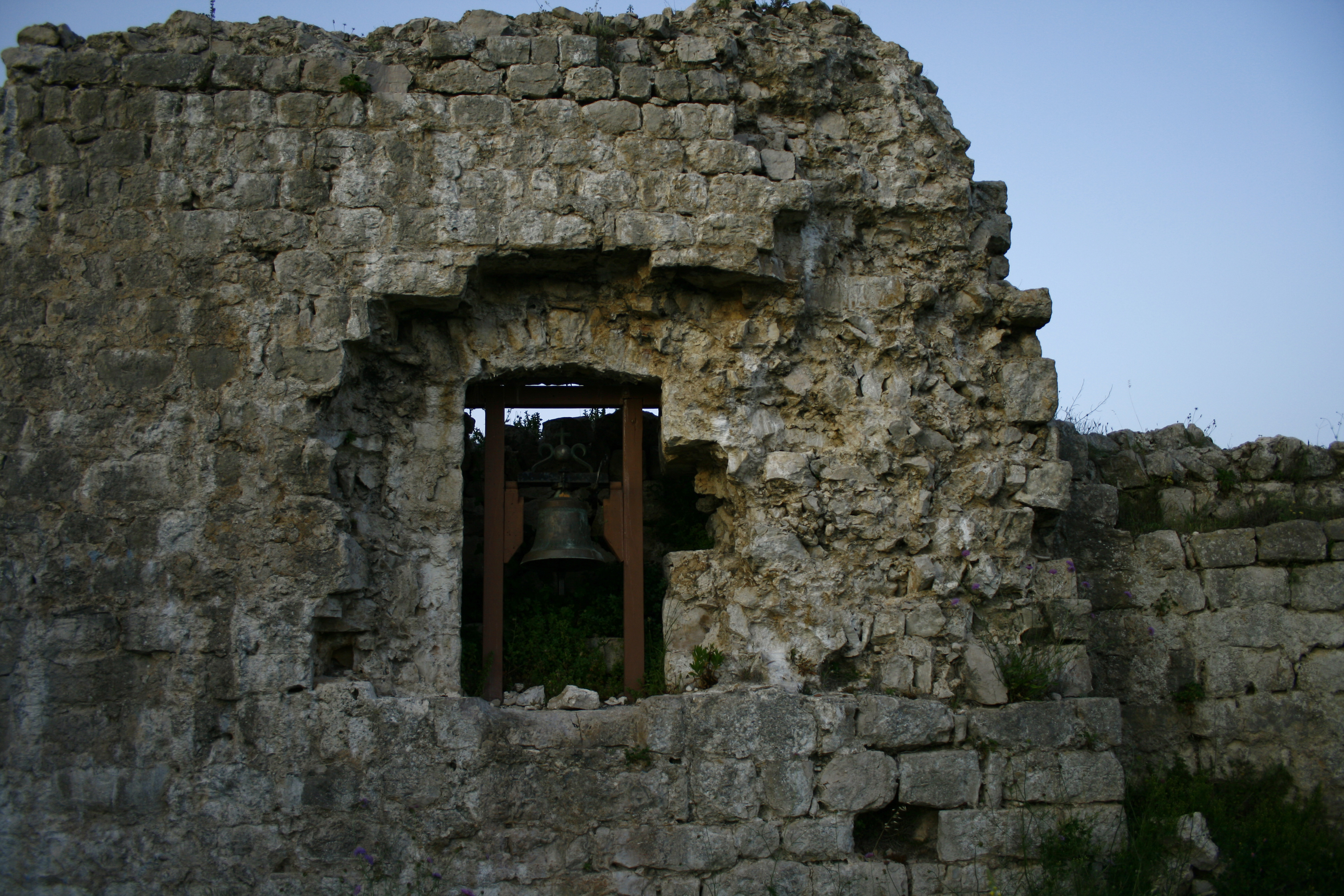
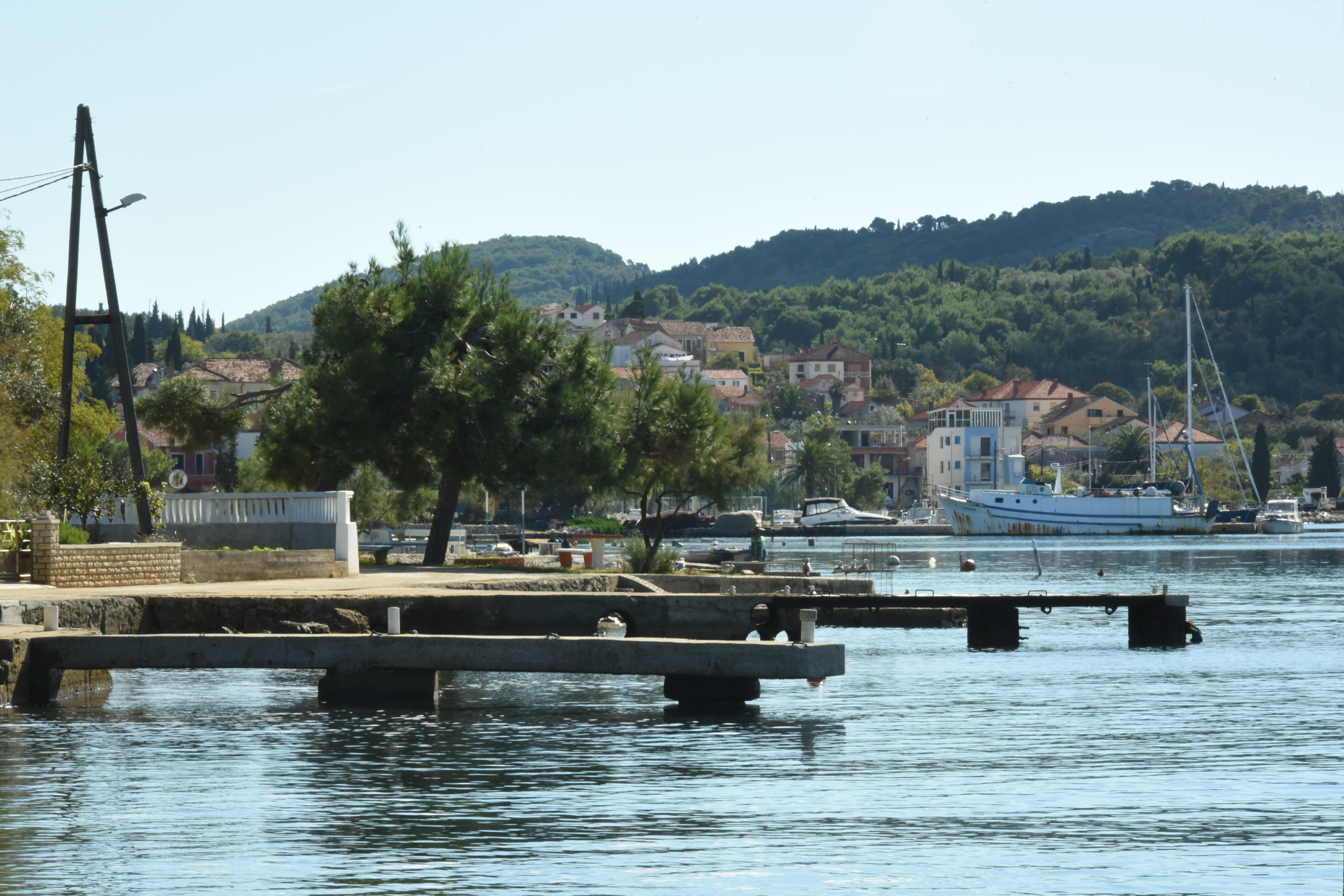
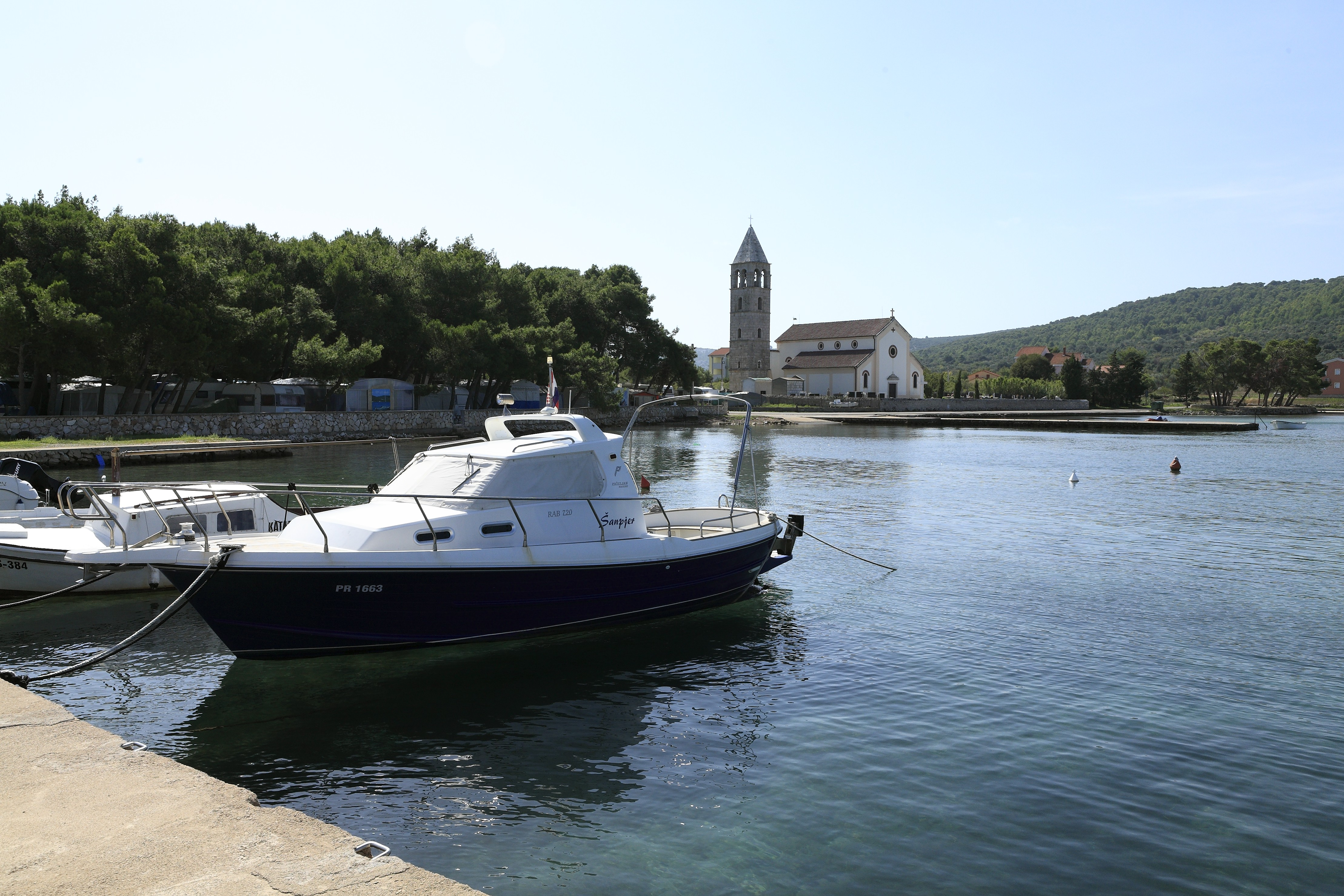
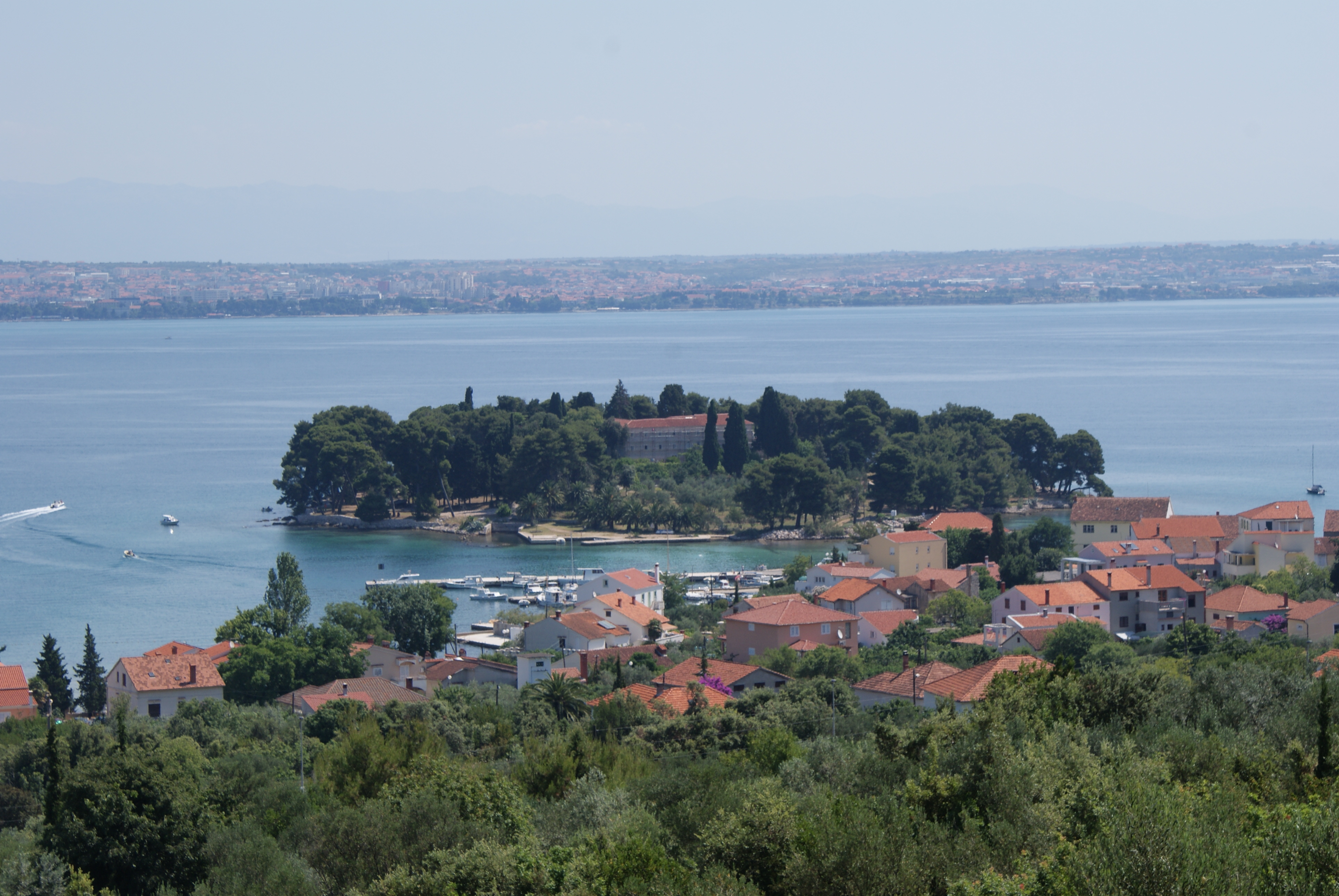
- Interactive map of Preko
- Location within Croatia
- Coordinates: 44°05′11″N 15°10′58″E
- Country: Croatia
- County: Zadar County

Government
  - Municipal mayor: Jure Brižić (HDZ)

Area
  - Municipality: 54.6 km^{2} (21.1 sq mi)
  - Urban: 5.7 km^{2} (2.2 sq mi)

Population (2021)
  - Municipality: 3,556
  - Density: 65.1/km^{2} (169/sq mi)
  - Urban: 1,250
  - Urban density: 220/km^{2} (570/sq mi)
- Time zone: UTC+1 (CET)
  - Summer (DST): UTC+2 (CEST)
- Postal code: 23273 Preko
- Vehicle registration: ZD
- Website: opcina-preko.hr

Preko (Italian: Oltre; lit. "Across") is a village and a municipality in Zadar County, Croatia. It is situated, as the name suggests, opposite of Zadar, on the island of Ugljan, in northern Dalmatia. Its old centre consists of typical Dalmatian architecture with numerous patrician family summer houses. According to the 2011 census, there are 3,805 inhabitants, 88% which are Croats.

== History ==
Sitting in the mountains above Preko is Fort St. Michael, built by the Eastern Roman Empire in the 6th century. The castle was rebuilt by the Republic of Venice in the 13th century. Its main purpose was control above channel of Zadar and the archipelago of islands behind the island of Ugljan. The castle was sacked by English crusaders on their way to the Holy Land, and by the Nazis in World War II. The high position of the castle made it the perfect lookout and listening station for the occupying Germans. Today, the castle is home to a telecommunications station. About 80 m from Preko lies the islet of Galevac (Školjić).

The 11th century Romanesque church of St. John the Baptist is situated on the eastern side of the locality, near the ferry port. Preko is the closest starting point for the excursion to Fort St. Michael (265 m above the sea level). The view from the fortress extends to more than 200 islands of the archipelago of Zadar and the Kornati National Park.

== Demographics ==
In 2021, the municipality had 3,556 residents in the following 8 settlements:

- Lukoran, population 478
- Ošljak, population 35
- Poljana, population 321
- Preko, population 1250
- Rivanj, population 23
- Sestrunj, population 45
- Sutomišćica, population 380
- Ugljan, population 1024
Preko: Population trends 1857–2021
v

population	3374	3856	4294	5025	5740	6407	7496	7065	7189	7030	6929	6510	4382	4613	3871	3805	3556
	1857	1869	1880	1890	1900	1910	1921	1931	1948	1953	1961	1971	1981	1991	2001	2011	2021

Sources: Croatian Bureau of Statistics publications
