= Battle of Camaret =

1694 battle of the Nine Years' War

Coordinates: 48.2767°N 4.5956°W

Attack on Brest
- Part of the Nine Years' War
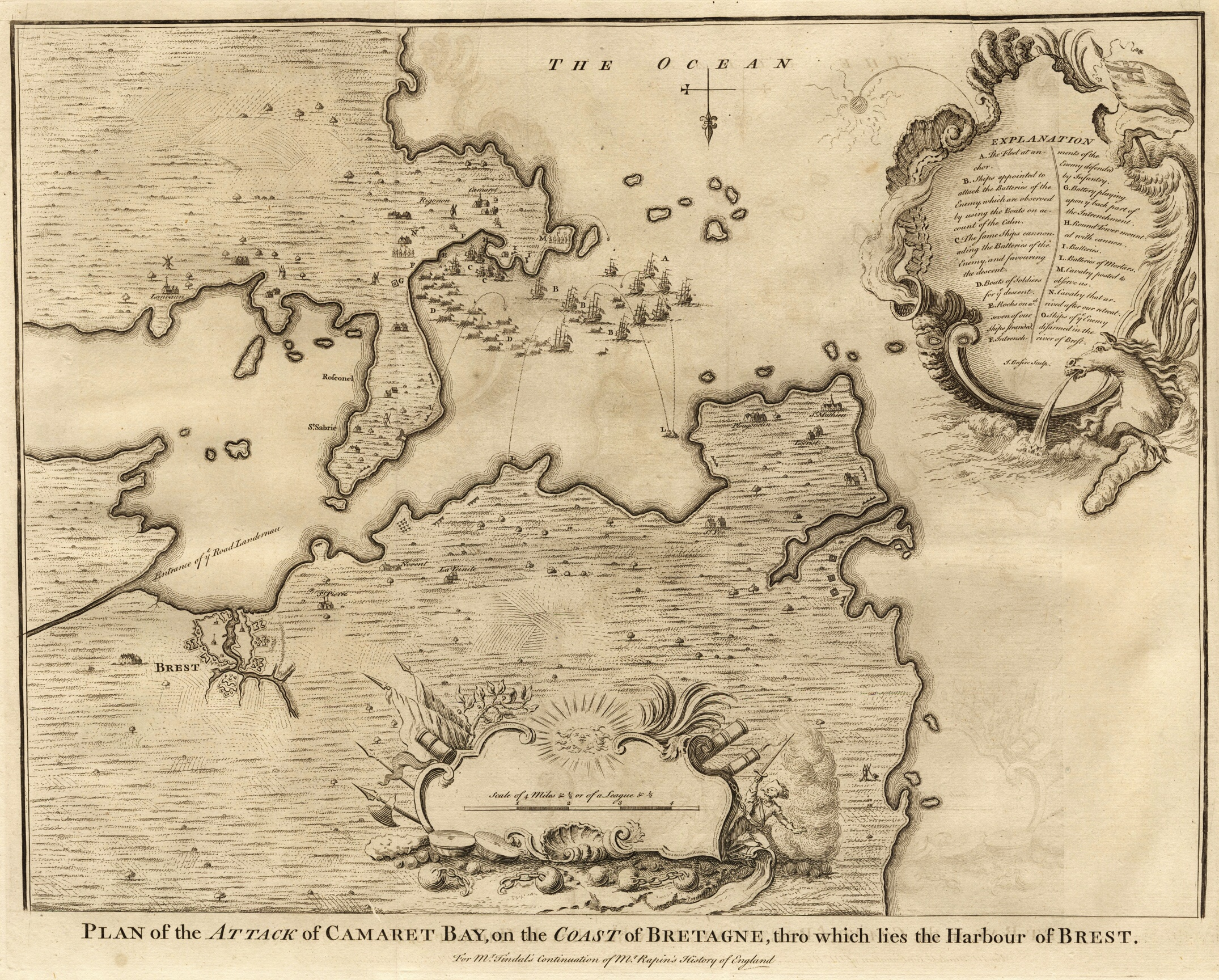
- English plan of the Battle of Camaret
Date	18 June 1694
Location	Brest, France
Result	French victory

Belligerents
England; Dutch Republic	France

Commanders and leaders
Thomas Tollemache (DOW); Marquess of Carmarthen	Sébastien Le Prestre de Vauban

Strength
10,000–12,000 men 36 ships of the line 12 bomb ships 40 or 80 troop transports	1,300 men 265 guns 17 mortars

Casualties and losses
1,100 killed or 1,200 killed or wounded 466 captured (including 16 officers) or 2,000 killed or wounded and 1,000 captured 1 ship of the line sunk and another captured Many longboats lost, including 48 captured	45 wounded (including 3 officers)

The Battle of Camaret, also referred to as the Brest expedition, was a notable engagement of the Nine Years' War. Expecting Brest to be unguarded as the French fleet stationed there sailed south to face the Spanish, an amphibious operation at Camaret Bay was launched on 18 June 1694 by an approximately 10,000 Anglo-Dutch force in an attempt to take and occupy the city, which was one of the most important French naval bases. The French, however, were aware of the Anglo-Dutch plan, through espionage. There is a controversial theory that John Churchill leaked the plan to the French via a letter to the deposed James II of England, but the evidence as to this is inconclusive.

The expedition was opposed by a much smaller force French troops led by the noted military architect Sébastien Le Prestre de Vauban, in his only ever field command. The battle involved fierce exchanges of fire between English and Dutch ships and French shore batteries and a land engagement which saw an allied landing party repulsed by a French counter-attack. The battle resulted in defeat for the Allies and their retreat.

== Context ==
At the start of 1694, Louis XIV decided to take the fight to the Mediterranean and Spain. Aiming to support Maréchal de Noailles in the capture of Barcelona and to force Spain to sign a peace treaty, Tourville sailed out of Brest on 24 April with 71 ships of the line and Chateaurenault's squadron followed him on 7 May. Informed of this fact, the English and Dutch planned to take Brest, thinking that this would be easy in the absence of Tourville and his fleet, and to land there a strong army of occupation 7,000 to 8,000 men.

After Tourville's victory at Lagos in 1693, William III of England had sent an expedition to make reprisals against Saint-Malo and planned to mount other similar operations against other French ports. Having got wind of the plan against Brest via spies, Louis XIV appointed Vauban military commander of Brest and the four lower-Breton dioceses, from Concarneau to Saint-Brieuc.

== Preparations ==
The English and Dutch assembled a fleet in Portsmouth under the command of Admiral Berkeley, consisting of 36 warships, 12 fireships, 80 transport ships (carrying around 8,000 soldiers), with a total force of around 10,000 men, under the command of general Thomas Tollemache.

Vauban started immediately to organize the defence of the city and the rocky coast around it. The bad weather kept the English fleet in its harbour for a month, giving the French enough time to prepare a warm reception.

=== General preparations ===
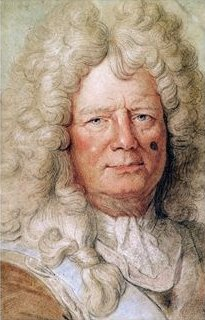
Vauban, commander of Brest

In 1685, well before the start of the Nine Years' War, Louis XIV had charged Vauban with inspecting the coast from Dunkirk to Bayonne. Of his first stay at Camaret, Vauban wrote in his memoir of 9 May 1685:

There are still two roadsteads outside the Goulet of Brest which serve as a vestibule to this entrance, of which one (known as Berthaume) is prepared against all the winds from the north, and that of Cameret against all those of Le Midy, both being well-held. There is nothing to do at that of Berthaume since it can set fire land-based cannons. But there is a little merchant port at a corner of that at Camaret with bays where pirates withdraw with impunity, which happens often in course of war or bad weather : this is why it should be necessary to here make a battery of four or five guns supported by a tower and a small masonry enclosure to hold them, and to hold a net over this roadstead that, in this way, would become an assured refuge for the good of merchant vessels that are forced in by bad weather more often than they are at risk of being captured

—

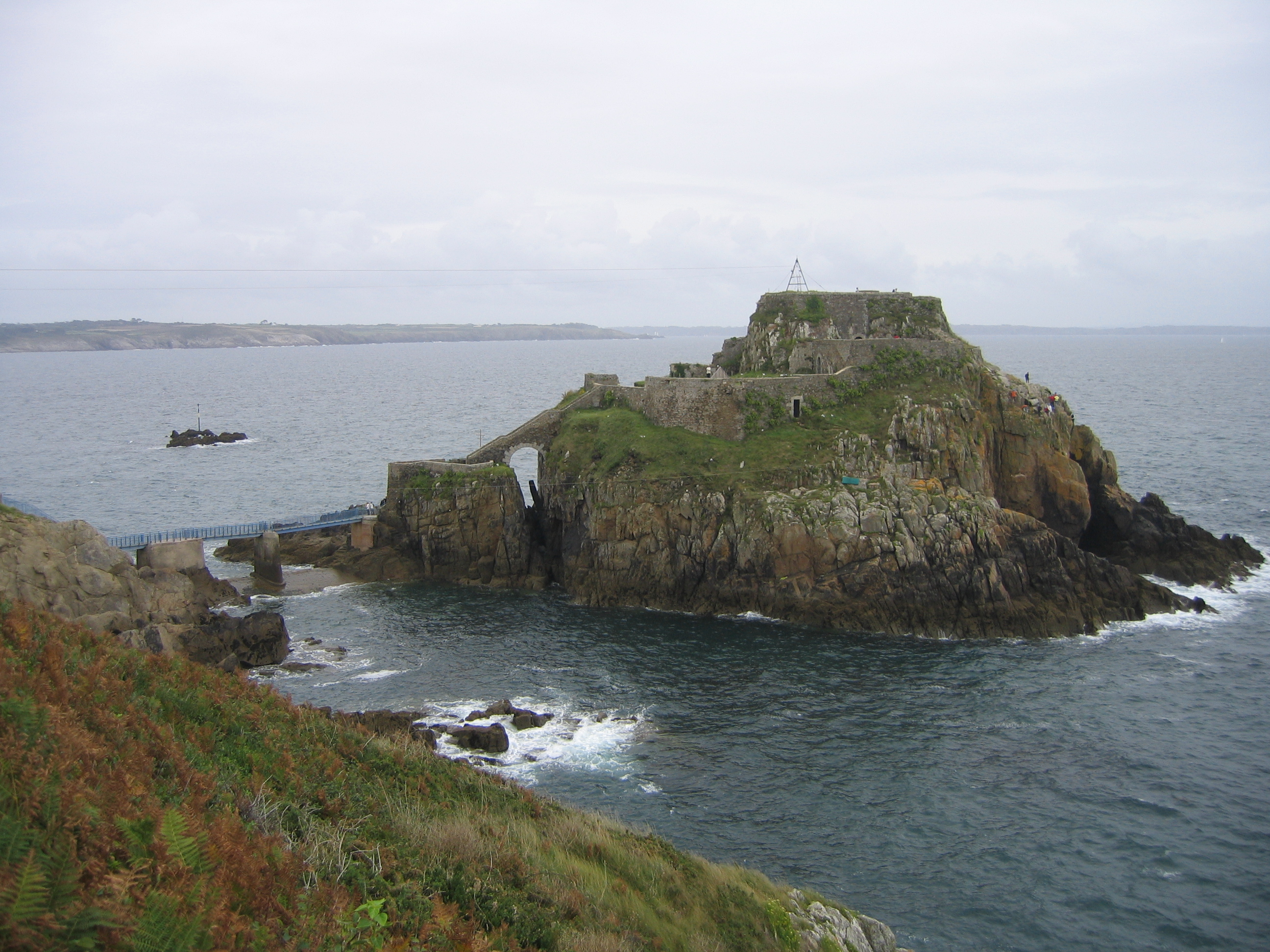
Fort de Bertheaume with the Roscanvel peninsula in the background

Just after the war began and, having inspected the sites already, he decided first to set up a defensive position at Bertheaume and to build a "tour de côte" at Camaret, the unique example of its type. Vauban's first designs foresaw the building of a round tower, but once he arrived he decided to make it a polygonal tower. Work on the tour de Camaret began in 1689. The English forewarned by spies and realising the importance of the works, attempted to destroy the building. In 1691 sixteen Anglo-Dutch vessels were sighted in Camaret Bay, but five French frigates happened to be present and drove the English ships off. Due to the fallible means at his disposal for the defence of a space covering several hundred kilometres of coast (a few hundred miles), Vauban decided to set up forts in several places, maintained by militia forces but able to be quickly reinforced by regular troops stationed in the rear.

=== Preparations for the attack ===
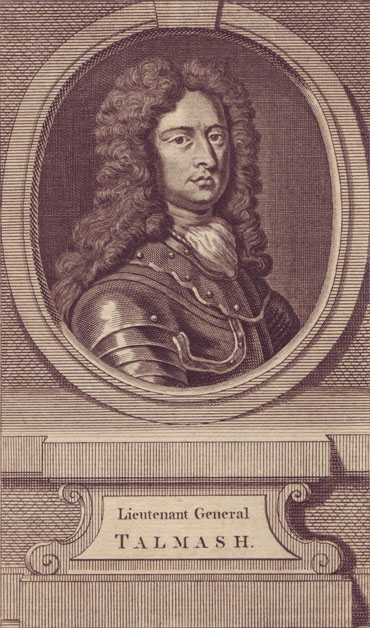
General Talmash, commander of the landing forces

At the start of 1694, having learned of Tourville leaving Brest with 53 ships of the line, William III believed that Brest would be easily taken and decided to launch an attack on it. As the historian Prosper Levot writes, this attack

...seemed favoured by the resolution of Louis XIV to concentrate his naval forces in the Mediterranean, so that with their help, Marshal de Noailles would be able to take Barcelona, force Catalonia to submit, and oblige Spain to ask for peace.

William III's plan was to have the majority of the Anglo-Dutch fleet, under the orders of admiral Russell, sail towards Barcelona to fight Tourville and to have the rest of it, under the orders of John Berkeley, land an invasion force (under lieutenant-general Thomas Tollemache) at or near Brest and take control of the Goulet and roadstead of Brest. The English considered that Brest's fate mainly depended on control of the goulet, remembering the 1594 attempt on Brest (in which a Spanish force of only 400 had held off over 6,000 troops under John VI of Aumont for over a month in the siege of Crozon.

In the face of more and more clear English threats, Louis XIV made Vauban "supreme commander of all French land and sea forces in the province of Brittany". Vauban had already been lieutenant-général des Armées since 1688 and accepted the new post on one condition: that he would not be "honorary [i.e. unpaid] lieutenant-general of the Navy". The statement on the fortifications by the engineers Traverse and Mollart, dating to 23 April 1694, showed 265 cannon and 17 mortars. When Vauban received the royal directives at the start of May, Brest was defended by a garrison of around 1,300 men. Arriving in Brest on 23 May, Vauban knew the odds were not in his favour, even in the scenario in which the expected last minute reinforcements consisting of a cavalry regiment, a dragoon regiment, and six infantry battalions would manage to be there on time.

After preparations made in Portsmouth, the allied fleet assembled on 1 June 1694. Vauban multiplied the construction of fortified positions along the coast and reinforced those already in existence. In mid-June he inspected the defences under his command and noted that the baie de Douarnenez and above all Camaret would allow landings by large numbers of troops. He ordered them reinforced. Aiming to prevent any landings, and with no warships at his disposal, he equipped scores of chaloupes to defend the goulet and armed militias with weapons requisitioned by the navy. The cavalry regiments and dragoons were positioned at Landerneau and Quimper and, to enable the fast transmission of information, Vauban organised a communications code in the form of signals. In a letter to Louis XIV on 17 June 1694, he reported:

I arrived yesterday evening on the coast at Camaret and its environs around the bay of Douarnenez. I ordered the retrenchment of several bays onto which one could descend to take the Roscanvel peninsula from the rear, and all our retrenchments at Cameret. At the same time I marked out camps for the regiments of la Roche-Courbon and la Boëssière, which had still not arrived, the quarters of Monsieur de Cervon and Monsieur de la Vaisse and the militia posts in the country. All this had to be put into execution incessantly, without waiting for the troops' arrival, and five or six days of work would put this part of the coast into a good state and an assured defence.[...]

== Battle ==
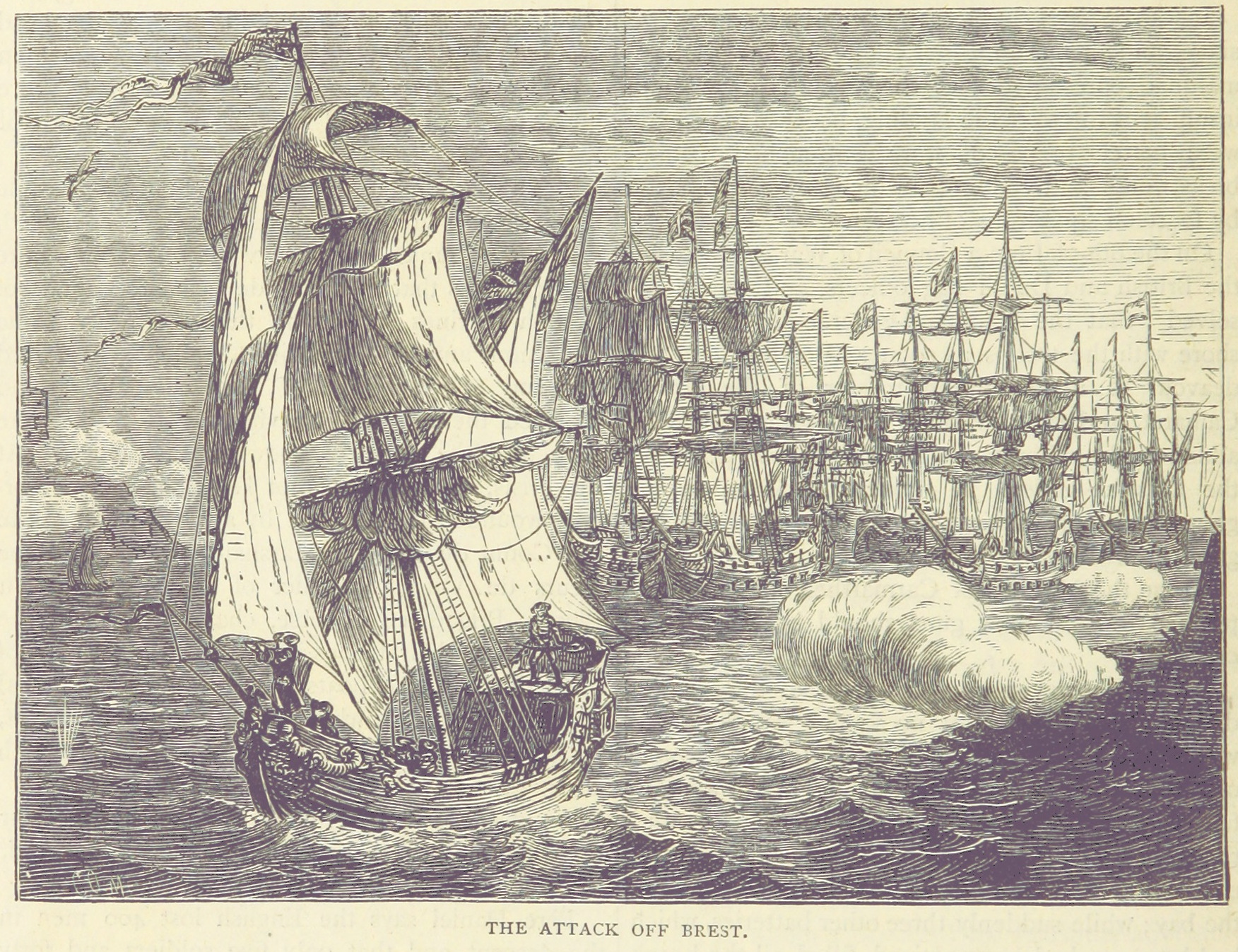
The English fleet attacks

=== 17 June 1694 ===
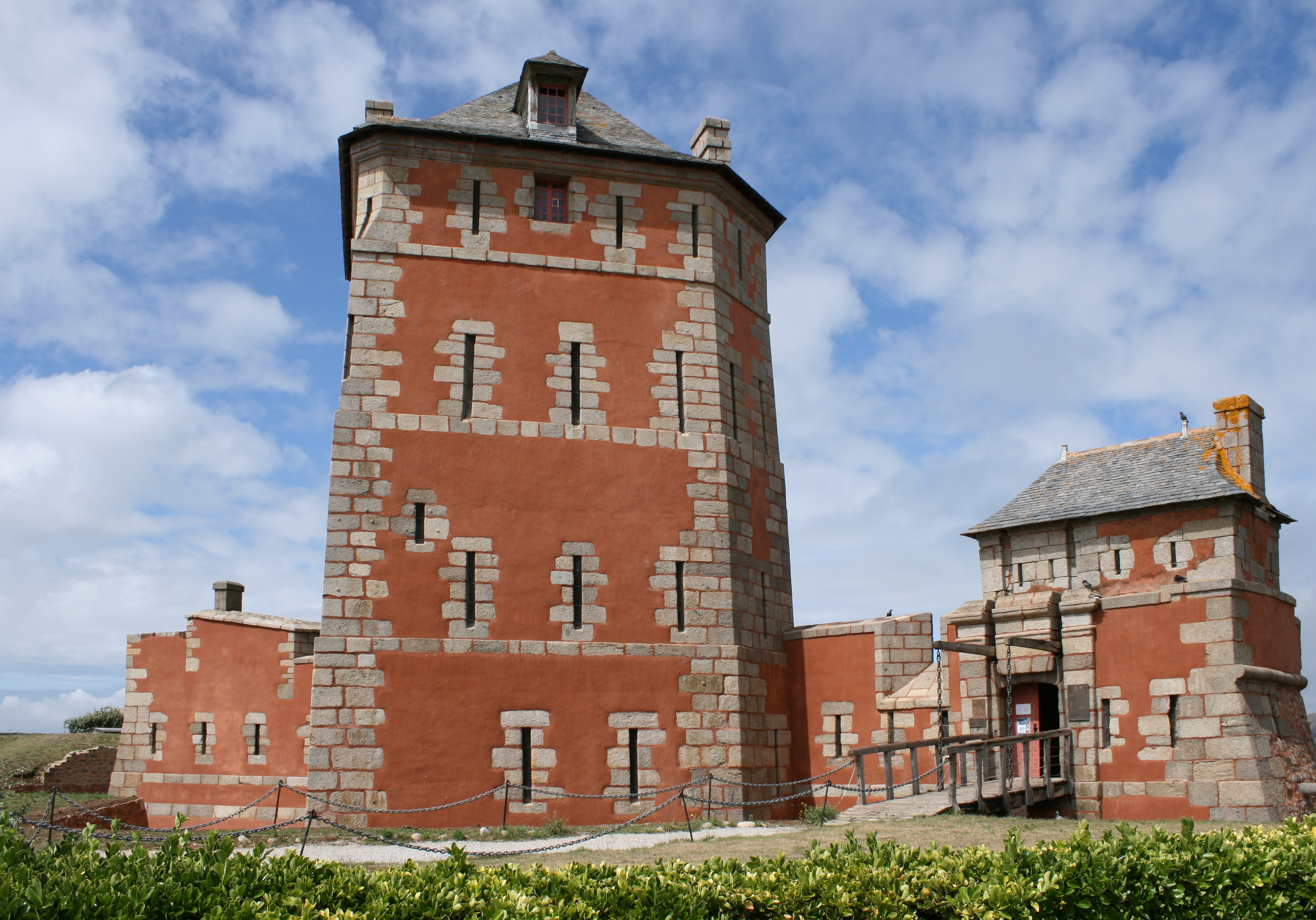
Tour Vauban

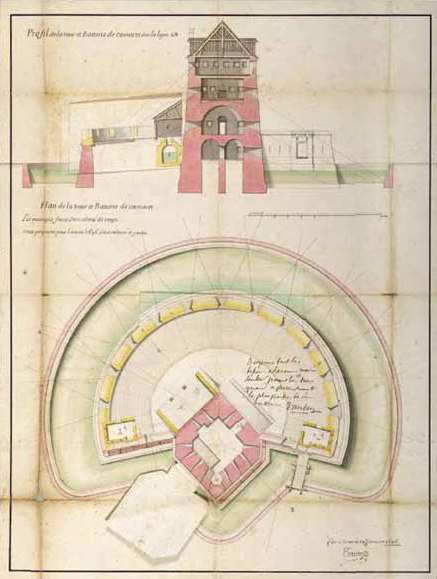
Profile and plan of the tour de Camaret

The Anglo-Dutch fleet (of 36 ships of the line, 12 bomb vessels as well as 80 transport ships carrying around 8,000 soldiers) under Berkeley finally set out and signals reached Vauban on the evening 17 June that the fleet was in the mer d'Iroise. It anchored halfway between Bertheaume and le Toulinguet near Camaret Bay, close to the mouth of Brest harbour.

Rear admiral the Marquess of Carmarthen (accompanied by John Cutts) approached the coasts to check on the French positions and possible landing places. On his return

he announced that the defences, of which he had only seen a small part, were formidable. But Berkeley and Talmash suspected that he had exaggerated the danger and decided to attack the next morning.

Unknown to the English, at this point the promised French reinforcements had still not arrived and Vauban wrote the following letter to the king at 11pm on 17 June:

...when, around 10pm, we heard signals from Ushant, marking that a large fleet had been sighted. This morning, in the day, the signals were confirmed, and a messenger was sent to those who commanded at Ushant, we learned that they had sighted 30 or 35 men of war and over 80 other transport vessels of all kinds, and it was confirmed between 4 and 5pm they had anchored between Camaret and Bertheaume, within range of bombs from those two posts from which they fired 8 or 10 shot upon them which nearly all missed. I have seen all the batteries of Cornouaille and of Léon where I have sent several orders; one is able to count them and to distinguish them very well. There are three [ships with] cabins before the main masts and two [with them] before the foremasts, which persuades me that it is a force composed of English and Dutch. The wind is against them; if it changes, I do not doubt that they will tomorrow descend into the roadstead, perhaps into both of them. Our galleys have not come, which is a great harm to us. I have ordered them this evening to make every effort to enter port, ranging along the nearby coast, in favour of our land batteries. I do not believe they will make it; but I well know that I will bear my forces so that Your Majesty will be content with me, and will without doubt not abandon it on this occasion. Our affairs are quite well disposed within the town.

=== 18 June 1694 ===
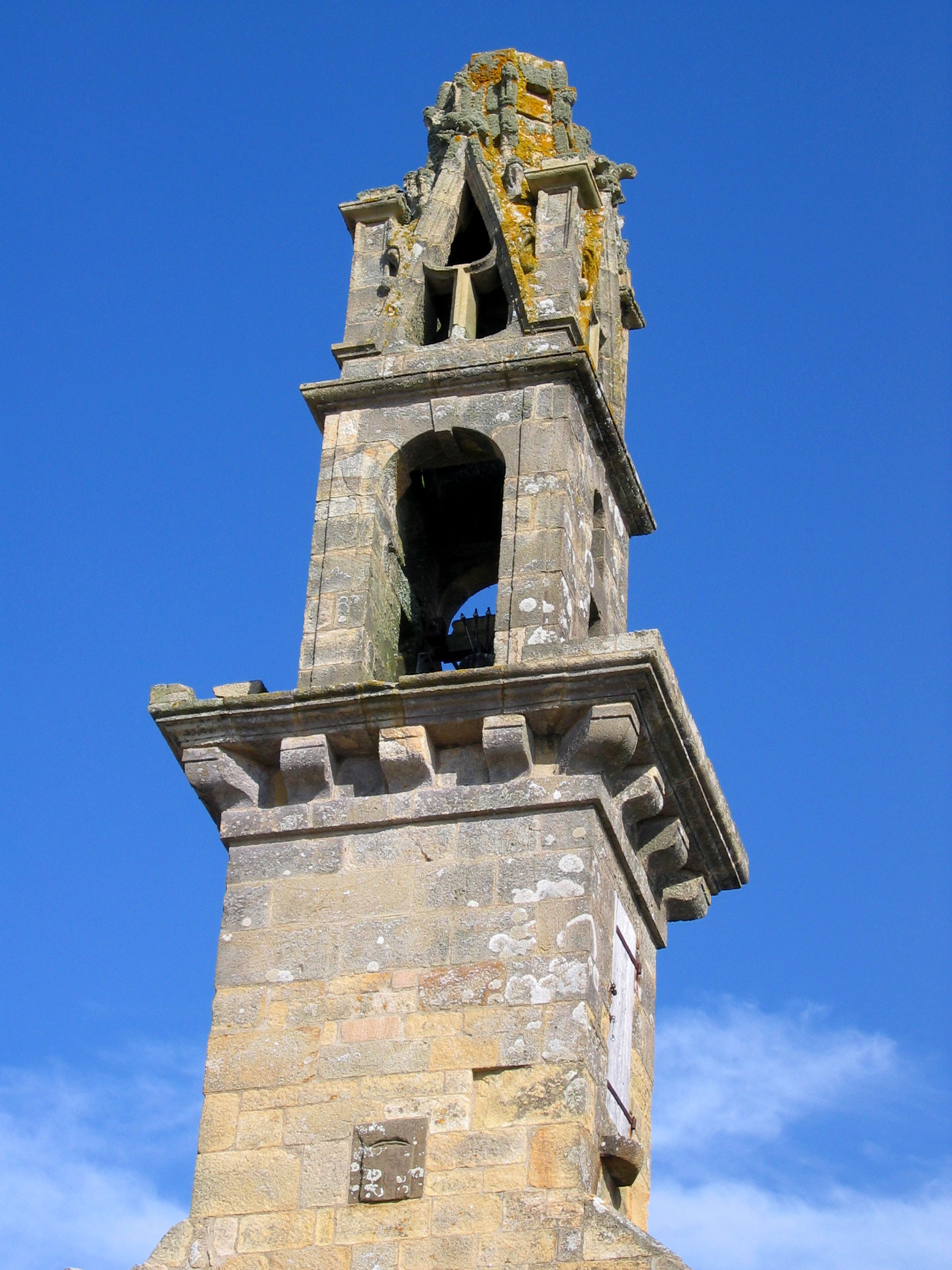
Spire of the Chapelle Notre-Dame de Rocamadour

On the morning of 18 June, a thick fog settled over this part of Brittany, blinding both sides and leading the English to postpone the attack. This aided the French "for a cavalry corps commanded by Monsieur de Cervon and part of the militia only arrived at Châteaulin at 9 o'clock". Thus it was only at around 11 o'clock, when the fog lifted, that Carmarthen could advance with eight ships to attack the Tour de Camaret and protect 200 longboats loaded with soldiers heading for the beach at Trez-Rouz. The Tour de Camaret, supported by the batteries at Le Gouin and Tremet, opened fire. Two ships were set on fire and the others badly damaged. The English retaliated, with several shots reaching the tower. In this encounter a cannonball shot off the top of the spire of the Chapelle Notre-Dame de Rocamadour.

A local legend recounts that The Virgin Mary appeared at the height of the battle and sent the ball back to the warship that was to blame, which sank. In reality, Vauban's gunners maintained effective fire at the attacking ships .

Meanwhile, Tollemache landed on the beach at Trez-Rouz at the head of 1,300 men, including French Huguenots, and was met with heavy fire. Wavering for a moment, they were then charged by 100 men of independent companies and 1,200 coastguard militiamen. Macaulay wrote in his History of England:

It soon appeared that the enterprise was even more perilous than it had on the preceding day appeared to be. Batteries which had then escaped notice opened on the ships a fire so murderous that several decks were soon cleared. Great bodies of foot and horse were discernible; and, by their uniforms, they appeared to be regular troops. The young Rear Admiral [Carmarthen] sent an officer in all haste to warn Talmash. But Talmash was so completely possessed by the notion that the French were not prepared to repel an attack that he disregarded all cautions and would not even trust his own eyes. He felt sure that the force which he saw assembled on the shore was a mere rabble of peasants, who had been brought together in haste from the surrounding country. Confident that these mock soldiers would run like sheep before real soldiers, he ordered his men to pull for the beach. He was soon undeceived. A terrible fire mowed down his troops faster than they could get on shore. He had himself scarcely sprung on dry ground when he received a wound in the thigh from a cannon ball, and was carried back to his skiff. His men reembarked in confusion. Ships and boats made haste to get out of the bay, but did not succeed till four hundred seamen and seven hundred soldiers had fallen. During many days the waves continued to throw up pierced and shattered corpses on the beach of Brittany. The battery from which Talmash received his wound is called, to this day, the Englishman's Death.

Tollemache was carried back towards the squadron by one of the few longboats still afloat. The French counter-attack drove the English back to the sea, and several of the landing troops were unable to retreat further since the falling tide had left the longboats high and dry. Only ten of these boats were able to rejoin the rest of the English fleet.

The English losses were considerable:

... on the English side, 800 of the troops from the landing force were killed or wounded, 400 men killed on the ships of the line, and 466 taken prisoner, including 16 officers. The French, according to reports prepared the same day by Monsieur de Langeron and Monsieur de Saint-Pierre, only had around 45 wounded, including 3 officers, including the engineer Traverse, who lost an arm.

Since that date the landing beach, stained red with blood, has been known as Trez Rouz (red beach). The nearest cliff to where Talmash landed, or the battery which fired the shot that hit him, is still known as Maro ar saozon (the Englishman's death).

When battle was joined Vauban found himself at Fort du Mengant and he only reached the battlefield itself when it was all over. In a letter to M. de Pontchartrain from Camaret on 18 June, he wrote:

I only had a part in the orders and the dispositions; what is more the thing happened two leagues away from me. I have heard the enemy were well met, for they had lost not a single moment. They came immediately, they attacked immediately at the place I had always believed they would; in a word, they thought it out very well, but did not execute it so well

== Results ==
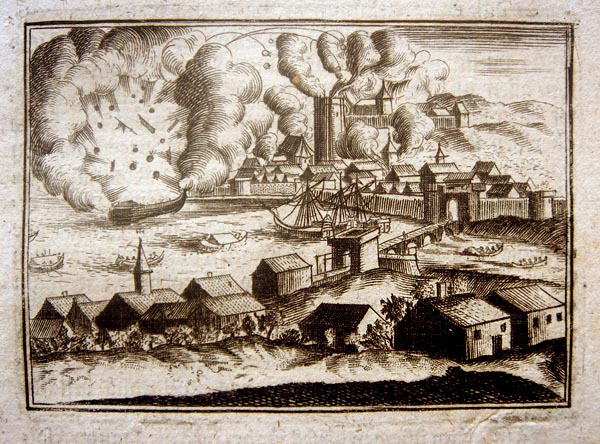
The Anglo-Dutch fleet bombards Dieppe

Talmash died of his wounds on his return in Plymouth. After this defeat, the Anglo-Dutch fleet put about and sailed back up the English Channel, bombarding ports such as Dieppe and Le Havre in reprisal. Le Havre was severely damaged in a 5-day bombardment, from 26 to 31 July. In September, the same fleet attacked Dunkirk and Calais, but their fortifications meant they could fight off the attacks and suffered only minor damage. This attack gave Vauban the chance to fortify the coasts around Brest, installing a battery at Portzic, another on île Longue, a third at Plougastel etc...

To celebrate the victory, Louis XIV struck a medal engraved "Custos orae Armoricae" (guard of the coast of Armorica) and "Angl. et Batav. caesis et fugatis 1694" (the English and the Dutch routed and put to flight 1694). By a decision of 23 December 1697 the States of Brittany exempted the inhabitants of Camaret "fully from contributing to fouages, tailles and other taxes which arise in the other parishes of the Province of Brittany".

== The "Camaret Bay letter" ==
Searching for a scapegoat after this bloody defeat, many accused John Churchill, then out of favour with William III, of treason. He was accused of sending a letter to the deposed James II in May 1694 forewarning him of the attack on Brest. This is what came to be known as the Camaret Bay letter, and it ran as follows:

It is only today that I have just learned the news I now write to you; which is, that the bomb-ketches and the twelve regiments encamped at Portsmouth, with the two regiments of marines, all commanded by Talmash, are destined for burning the port of Brest, and destroying all the men-of-war that are there. This will be a great advantage to England. But no consideration can prevent, or ever shall prevent me from informing you of 'all that I believe can be for your service. Therefore you may make your own use of this intelligence, which you may rely upon as exactly true. But I must conjure you for your own interest to let no one know it but the Queen and the bearer of this letter. Russell will set sail tomorrow with forty ships, the rest being not yet paid; but it is said that in ten days the rest of the fleet will follow; and at the same time, the land forces. I attempted to learn this some time ago from Admiral Russell. But he always denied it to me, though I am very sure that he knew the design for more than six weeks. This gives me a bad sign of this man's intentions. I shall be very well pleased to learn that this letter has come safely to your hands - The claimed letter from John Churchill, duke of Marlborough to king James II, translated by general Sackville, 3 May 1694.

The letter only exists in a French translation and Winston Churchill claimed in his biography of Churchill (his ancestor) that it was a forgery aimed at damaging Marlborough's reputation and that the duke never betrayed William III. Even if it is practically certain that Marlborough sent a message across the Channel at the start of May describing the imminent attack on Brest, it is equally certain that the French already knew of the plans for the Brest expedition via other sources. David Chandler concluded "the whole episode is so obscure and inconclusive that it is still not possible to make a definite ruling. In sum, perhaps we should award Marlborough the benefit of the doubt".

== Commemorations ==
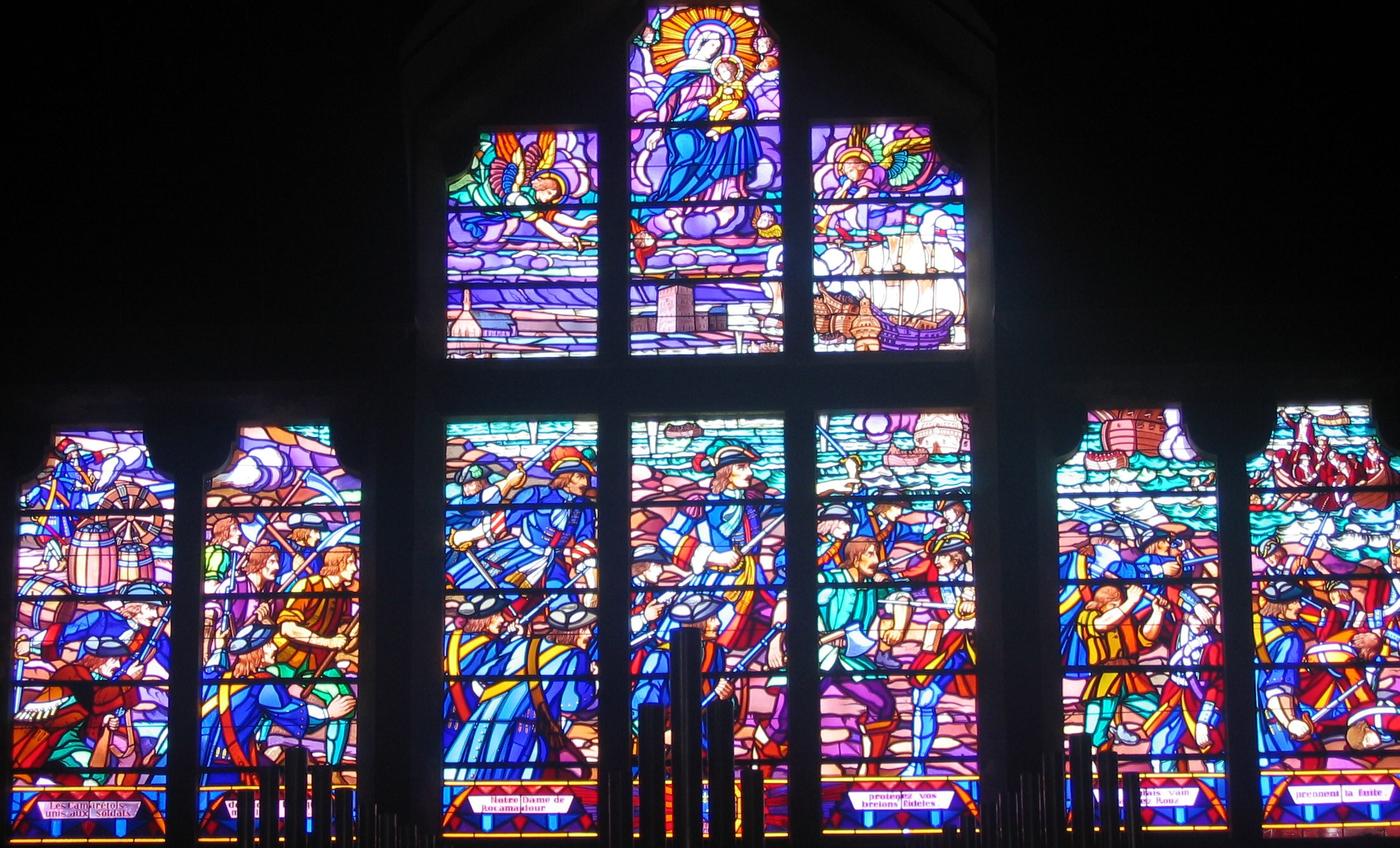
Stained glass window in the église Saint-Rémi

In the north transept of the parish church of Saint-Rémi, partly obscured by the organ pipes, there is a large stained-glass window showing the battle, designed by Jim Sévellec.

== See also ==
- Goulet de Brest (with links to most of the fortifications along it, many of which were built by Vauban)
- Camaret-sur-Mer
- Tour Vauban
- Combined operations and the European theatre during the Nine Years' War, 1688-97
