= Fort Sint-Michiel (Venlo) =

Fort in Venlo, Netherlands

Coordinates: 51°22′19″N 6°09′33″E

Fort Sint-Michiel was a Spanish fort situated in Venlo, the Netherlands. It was named after the archangel Michael. Construction of this fort started in 1641 on Michaelmas, September 29. It was demolished in 1867.

== History ==
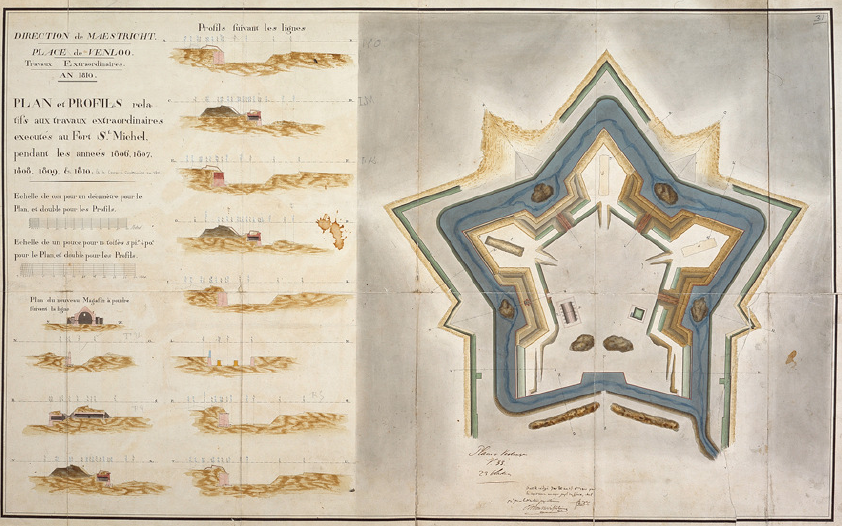
Sint-Michiel on a map, dating from 1810

In 1632, Frederick Henry, Prince of Orange (Dutch nickname: De Stedendwinger, the Conqueror of Cities), conquered the city of Venlo from the Spaniards in the Eighty Years' War. In 1637, after a long siege, he lost the city to the same Spaniards. Although the city had built a solid defense structure during the 16th century, a decision was made to build this fort on the west bank of the river Meuse. In 1646, Frederick Henry took another attempt to siege the city. Because the fort was already completed by then, he failed in his attempt.

Around 1450, there was already a fortification on the west bank. When the city of Venlo was added to the Dutch Republic in the 18th century, three new forts were built around the city: Fort Ginkel (named after Godard van Reede, Baron Ginkel, the local military commander at that time), Fort Beerendonck (named after a former farmhouse at that site) and Fort Keulen (Fort Cologne). The 14th century Tegelpoort (Gate to Tegelen) was replaced by the Roermondsepoort (Gate to Roermond). Because the military needed more space throughout the years, the barracks were found too small. After all, soldiers were still located in the houses of the citizens of Venlo. Therefore, the commander decided to have the soldiers located into bigger barracks and the forts.

In the 18th century, a report mentioned the severe state of the forts, especially Fort St. Michiel. Furthermore, the fort was situated too far from the river according to that report. This made the fort easy to conquer. Therefore, in 1831 Fort Leopold was built, an earth based fort named after Leopold I of Belgium.

== Slighting ==
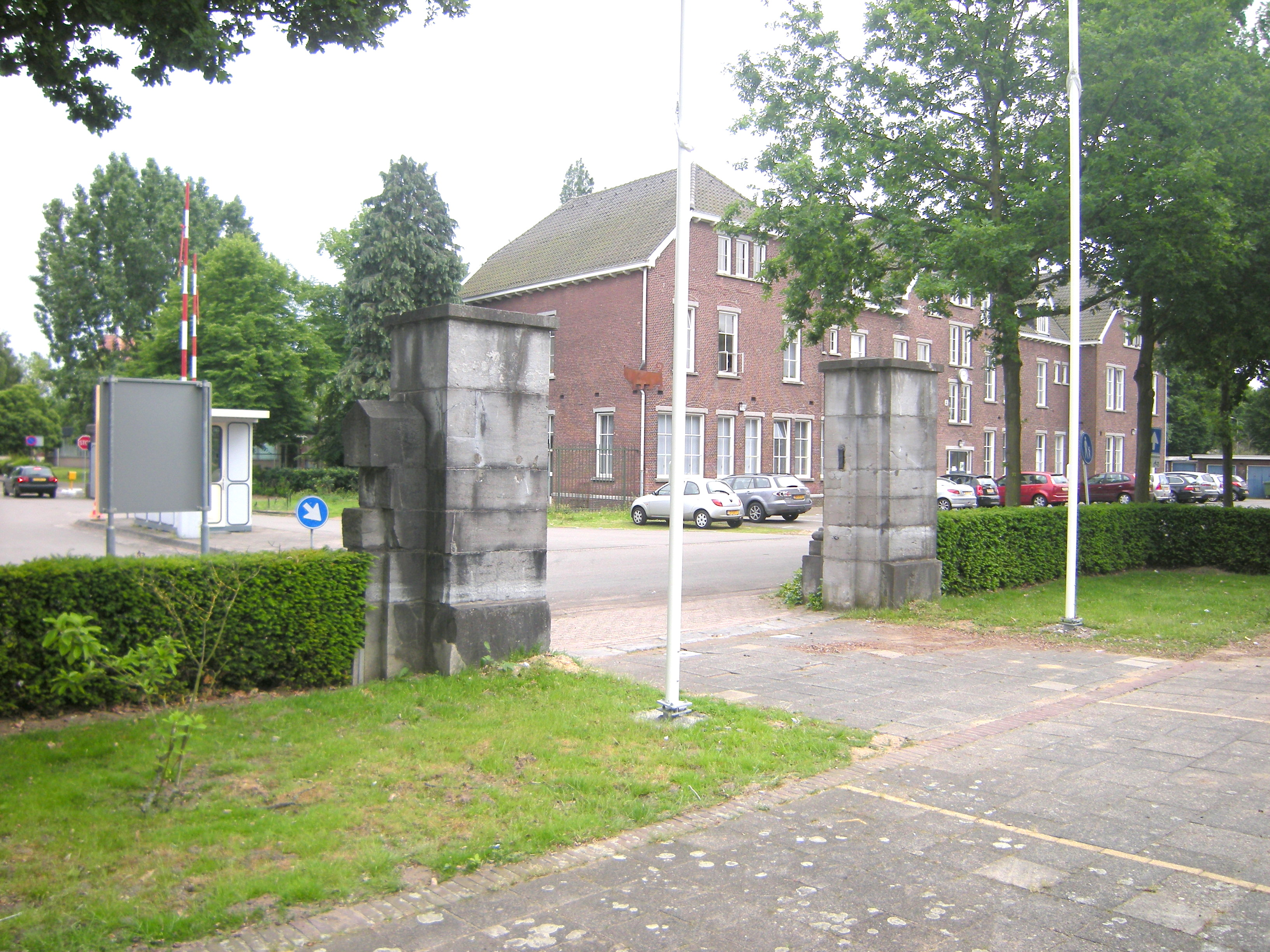
At this moment the only visible remains of the fort Sint-Michiel

In 1867, a Royal Decree issued the slighting of all strongholds in the Netherlands. Only two small pieces of the Venlo stronghold (the so-called Luif at the riverside and a lunette on the southside) remained. The fort Sint-Michiel, like all other fortifications in Venlo, was torn down to the ground. The sub-terrainean remains were left untouched.

At the very same place, the Barracks of Frederick Henry (Frederik Hendrikkazerne) arose between 1910 and 1913, a vast new barracks which included an officers mess, several arsenals, a military hospital and horse stables. From the beginning, it housed an infantry unit, and from 1947 the Venlo district of the military police as well. Meanwhile, all military activity has been moved elsewhere. The military police moved elsewhere shortly after the infantry left.

== Future ==
In 2005, the municipality of Venlo has bought the grounds and right now, a plan has been raised to redevelop the whole area. Among others, it should hold a new football stadium and the relocation of the Venlo establishment of the Holland Casino Group.

On November 10, 2010, the city of Venlo has made public that parts of the old fort have been found underground, in a very good state. It is yet unclear what will happen with these remains. Archaeologists have called this discovery “unique for the Netherlands”, because this appears to be one of the few forts built by the Spaniards on Dutch grounds. Especially the state of the remains are to be of importance.

On August 13, 2011, a task group has been formed by citizens who are concerned about the remains of the fort, who strive for preservation of these remains. Almost immediately after an interview with the spokesman was in the local newspaper, it was copied by the national media. The group wants people to be aware of the importance of this discovery and wants the city council of Venlo to adjust the plans for this area into having the remains preserved and displayed for the public. They use the fortifications of Bourtange and Naarden as an example.

== Gallery ==
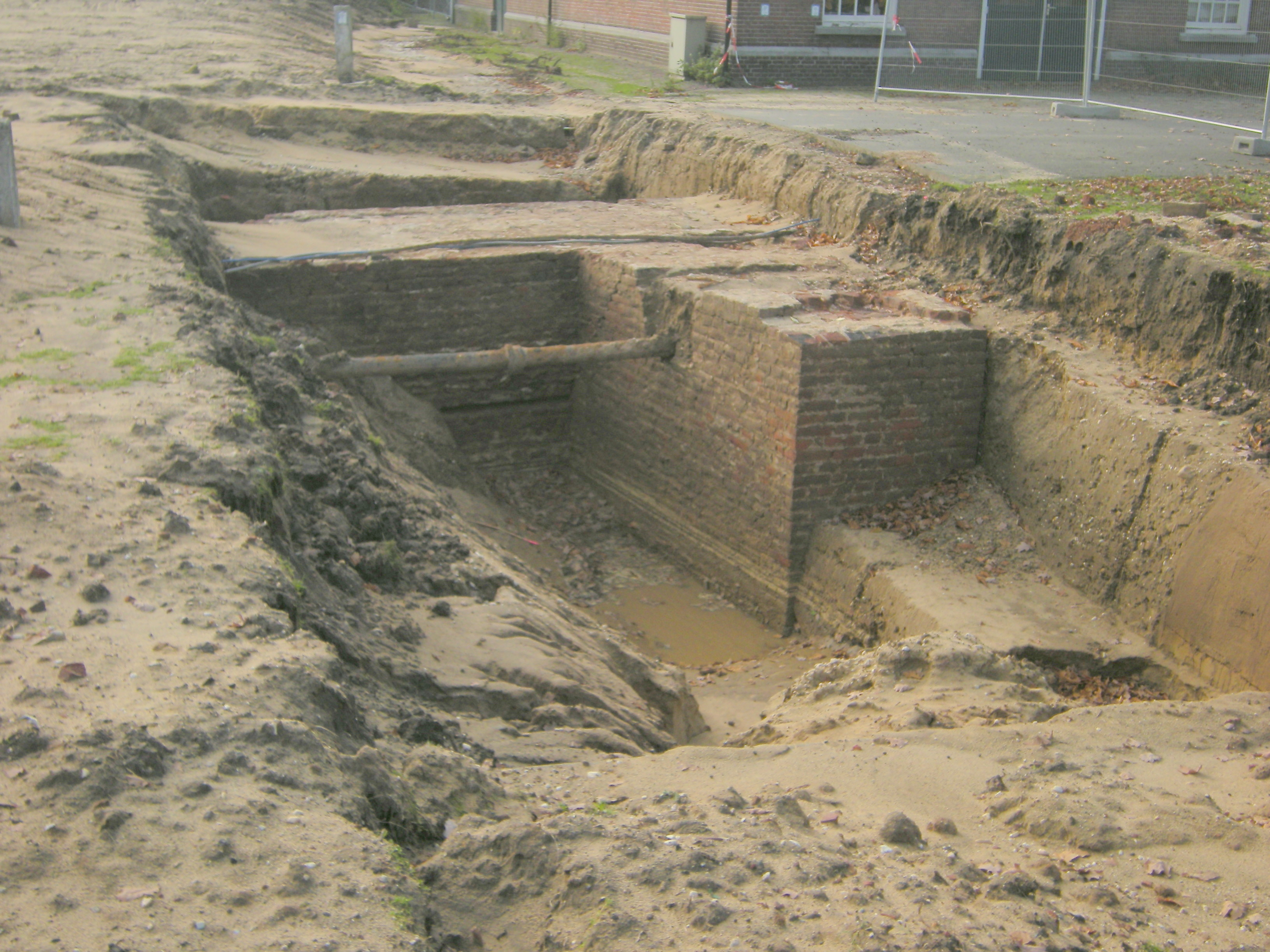

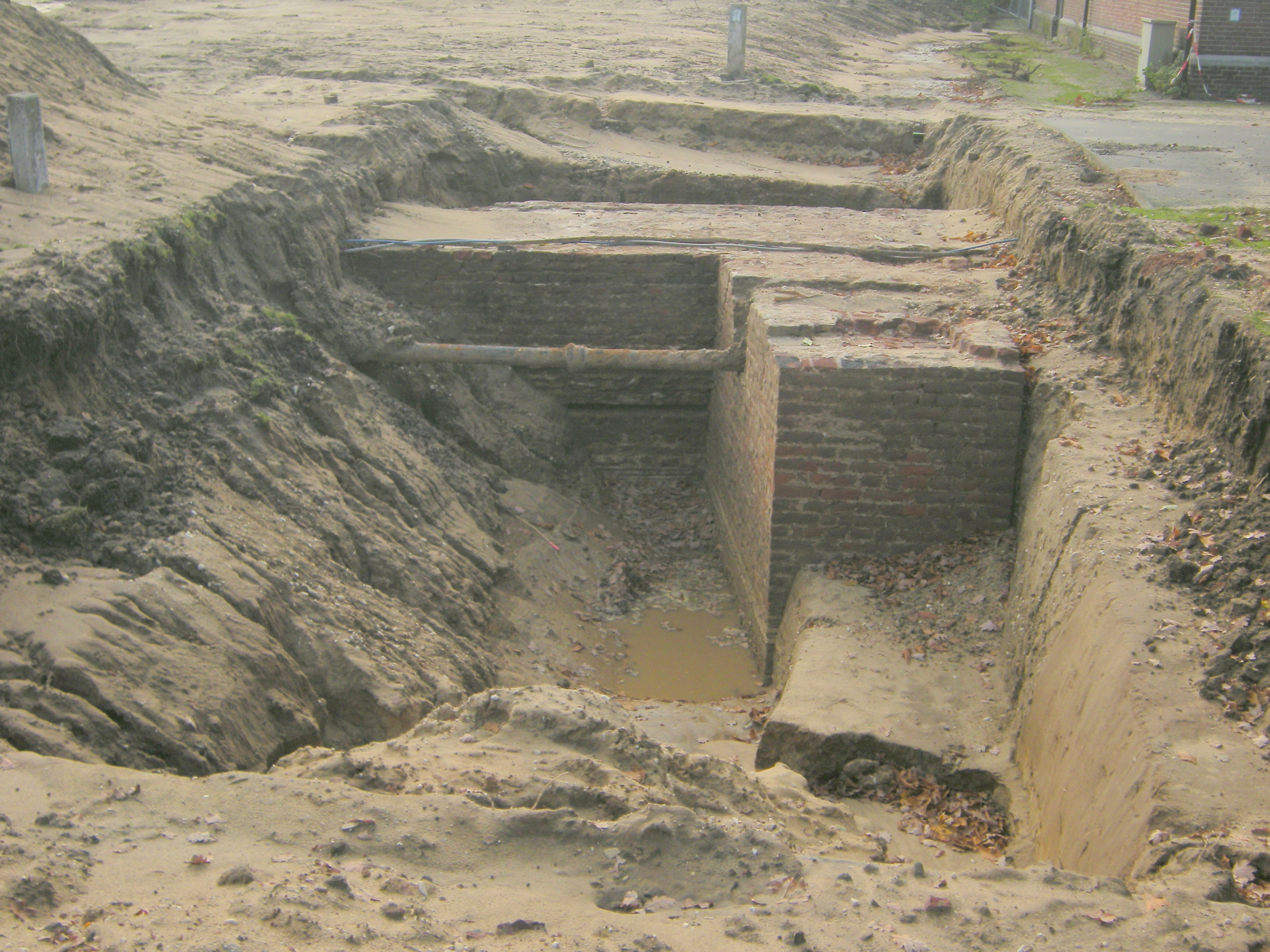

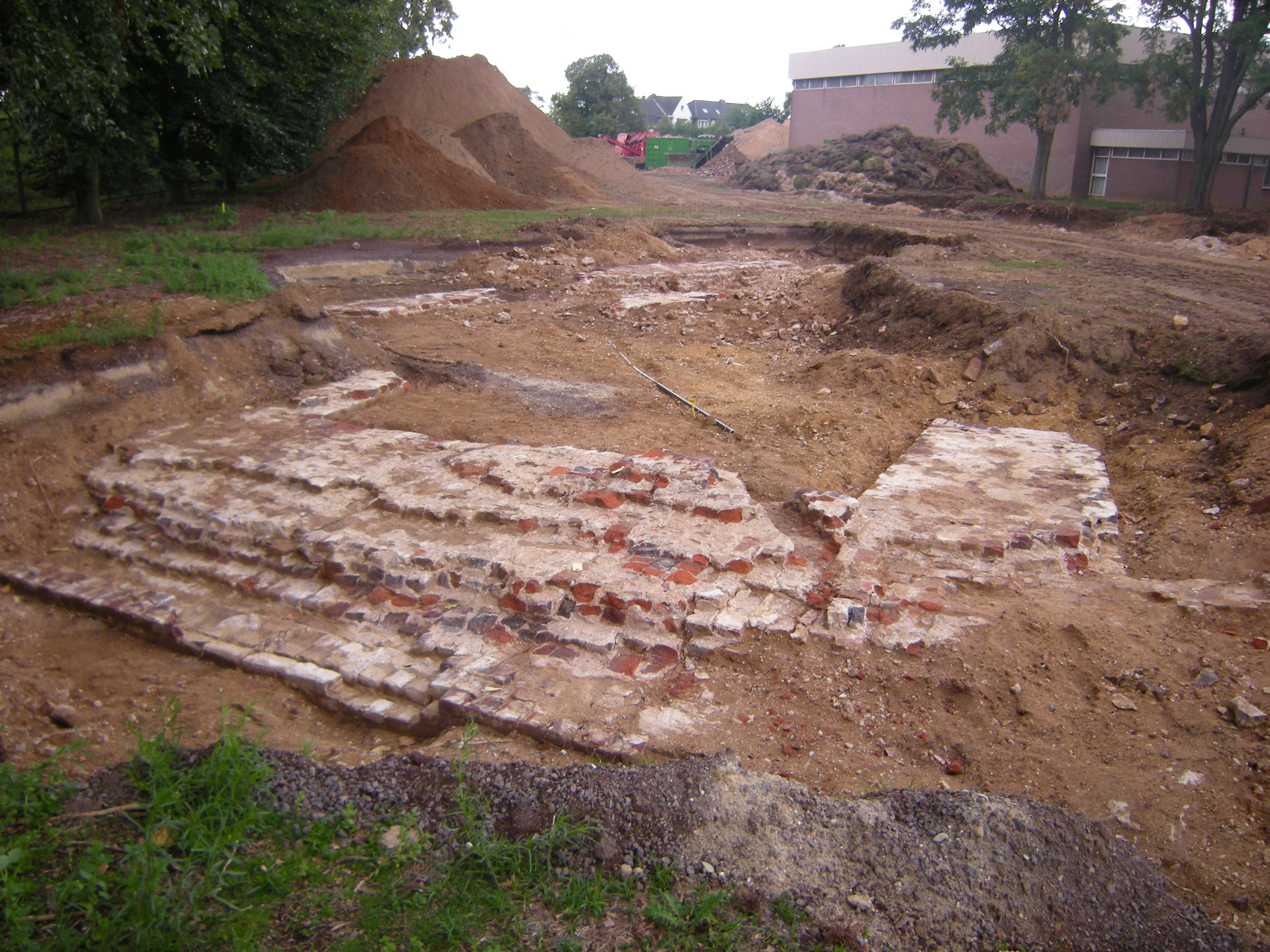

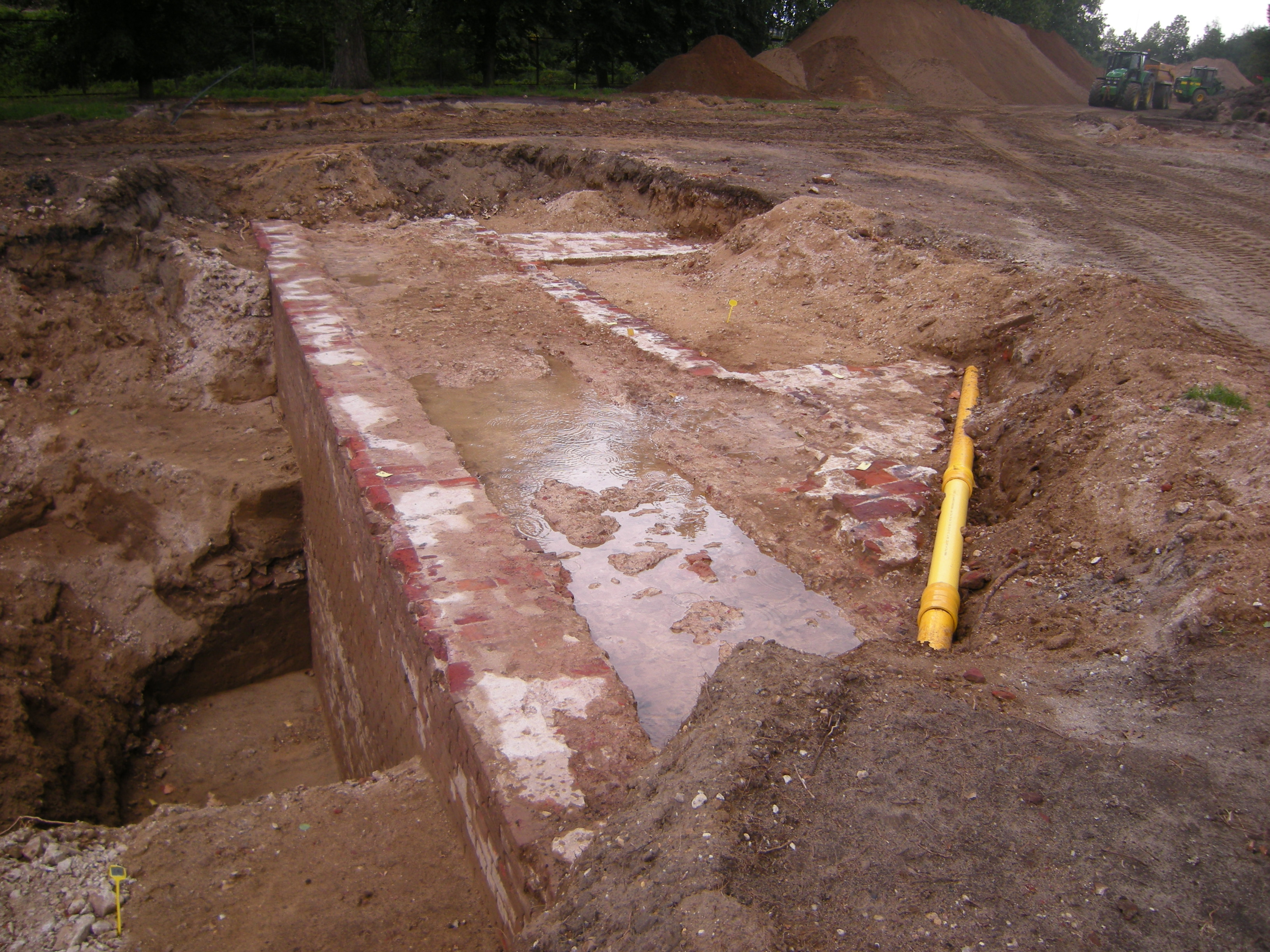
