= HMS Rover (1832) =

United Kingdom Naval Ship

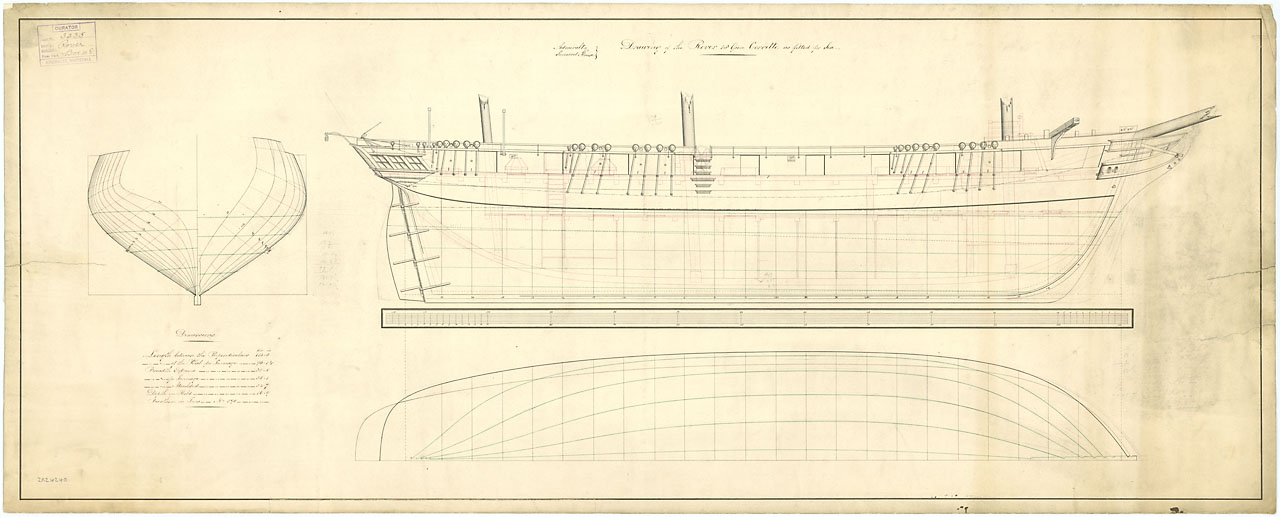
- Rover

History

United Kingdom
- Name: HMS Rover
- Builder: Chatham Dockyard
- Launched: 17 July 1832
- Fate: Broken up in 1845

General characteristics
- Type: Sloop
- Propulsion: Sails

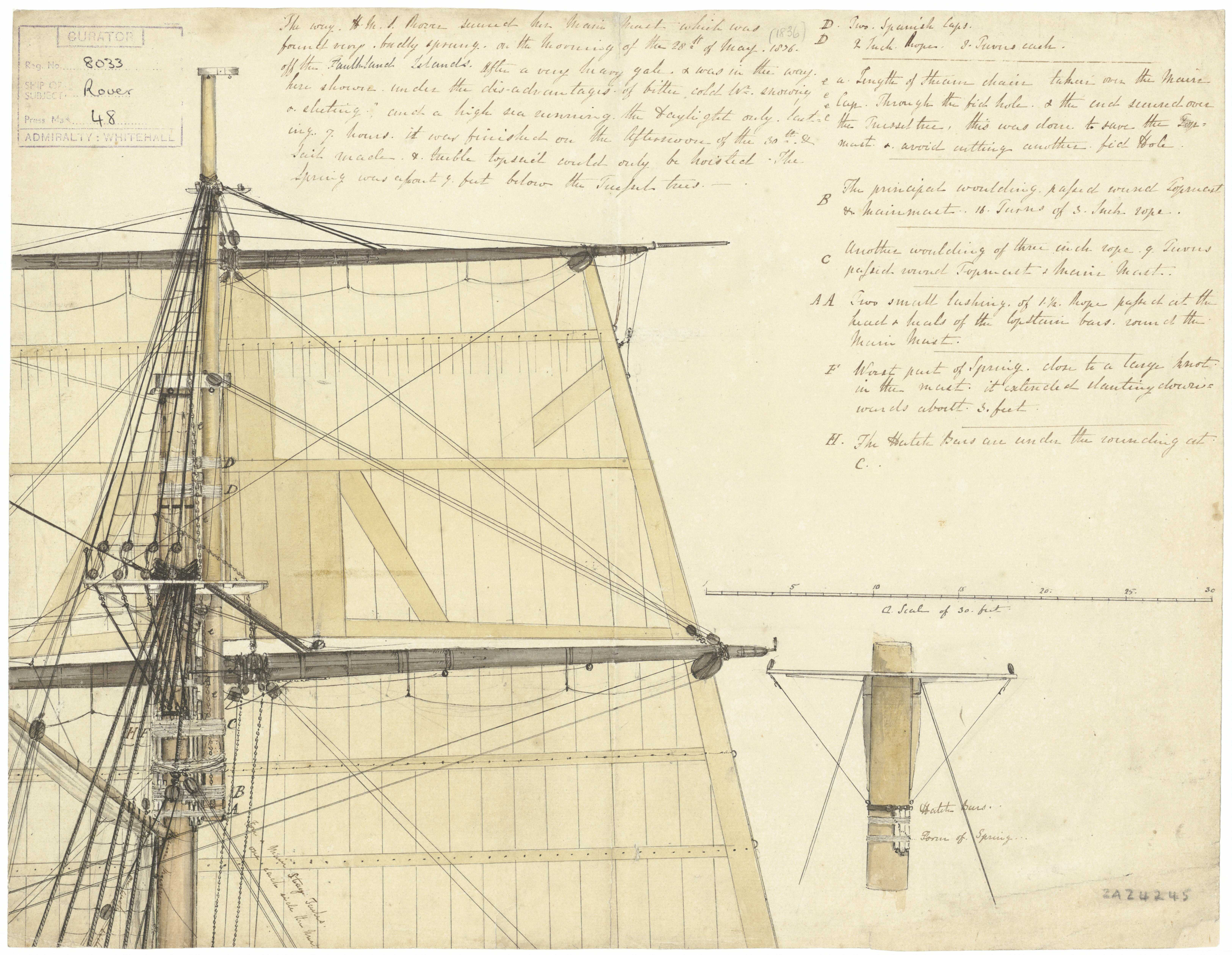
A plan of the method used to fix the sprung main mast for Rover

HMS Rover was an 18-gun sloop launched on 17 July 1832 from the Chatham Dockyard and broken up in 1845.
