= Camaret Bay =

Bay on the north coast of Brittany, France

Coordinates: 48°17′10″N 4°34′50″W

Camaret Bay (French: Anse de Camaret; Breton: Bae Kamaret) is a small bay on the north coast of Brittany, France.

In 1694 it was the site of the battle of Camaret, a failed amphibious landing by Anglo-Dutch forces as part of an attempt to seize the nearby port of Brest.

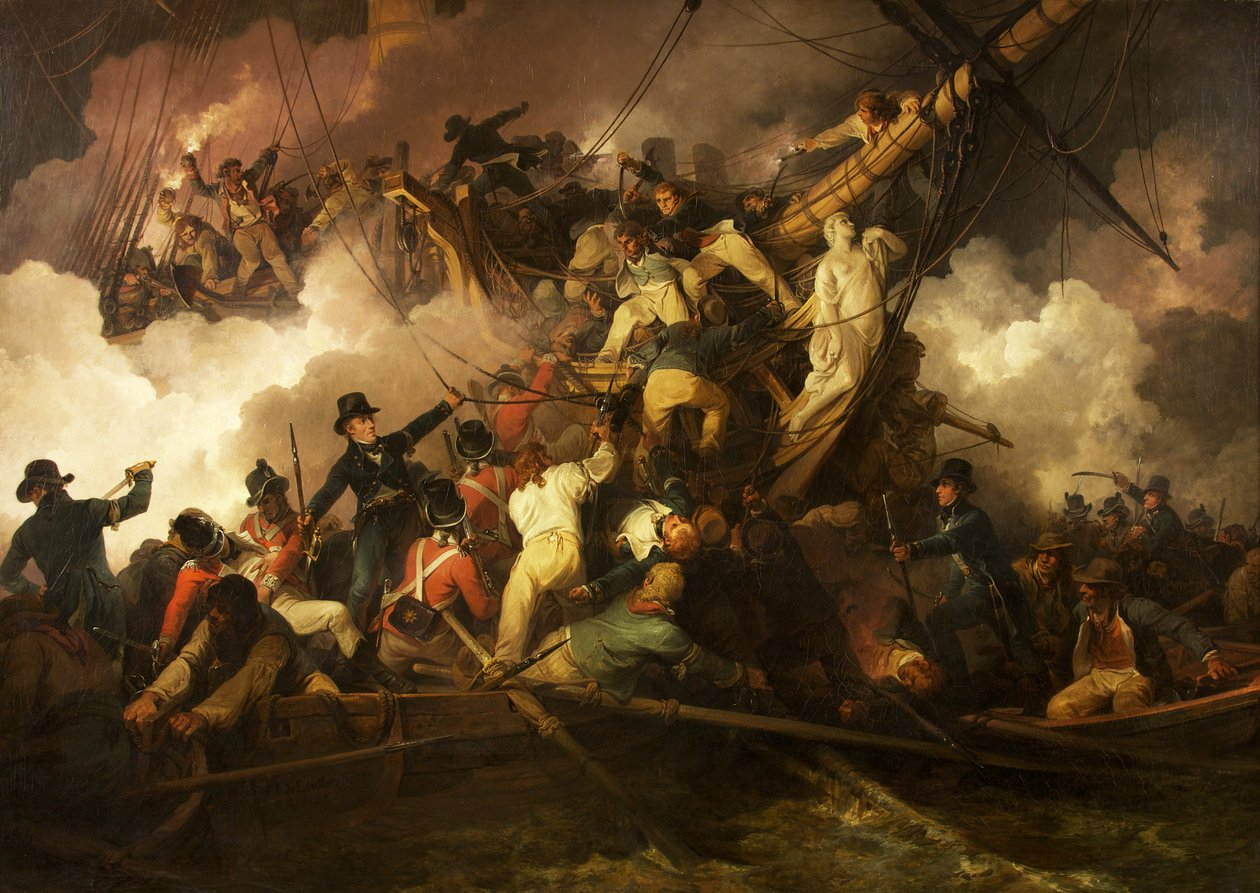
The Capture of the Chevrette by Philip James de Loutherbourg, 1802. The boats of H.M. ships Robust, Doris, Beaulieu, and Uranie cutting out the French corvette Chevrette (20), in Camaret Bay, 21 July 1801

== See also ==
- Camaret-sur-Mer
- Attack on Brest
