= St. Michael Fort =

Fort in Ugljan, Croatia

Coordinates: 44°04′18″N 15°09′39″E

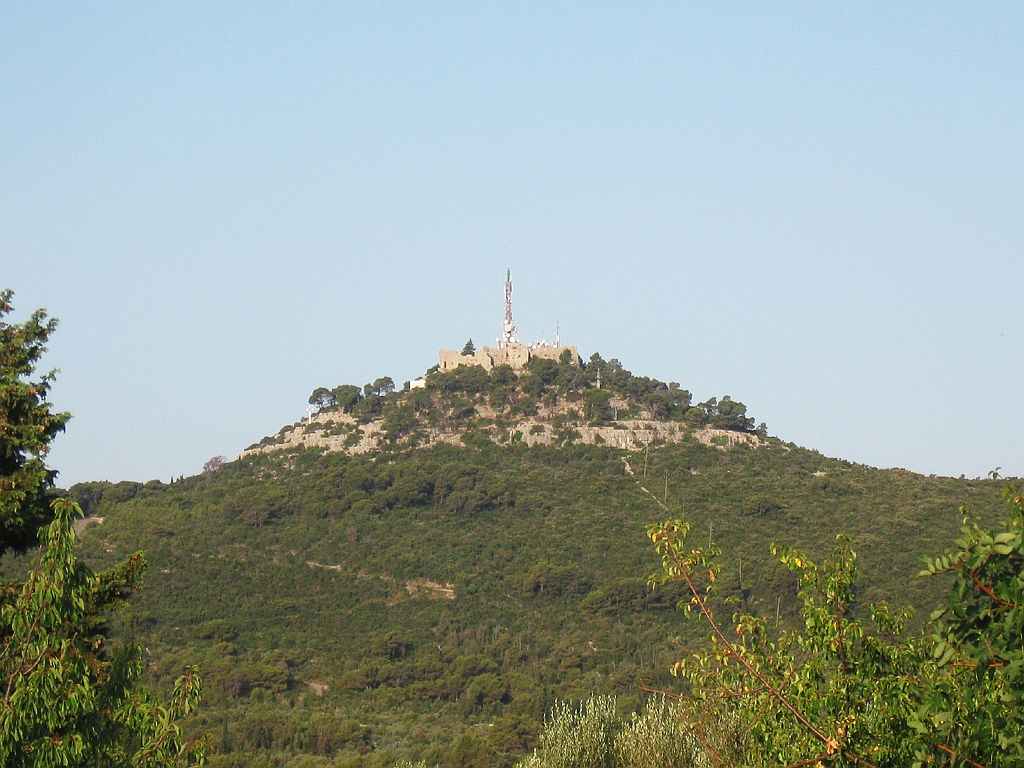
Fort St. Michael

Fort St. Michael (Croatian: Utvrda sv. Mihovila; Italian: Fortezza di San Michele) is a fortress on the island of Ugljan, in northern Dalmatia, Croatia. It was initially built by the Byzantine Empire in the 6th century, and rebuilt by the Republic of Venice in 1202, during the Fourth Crusade.

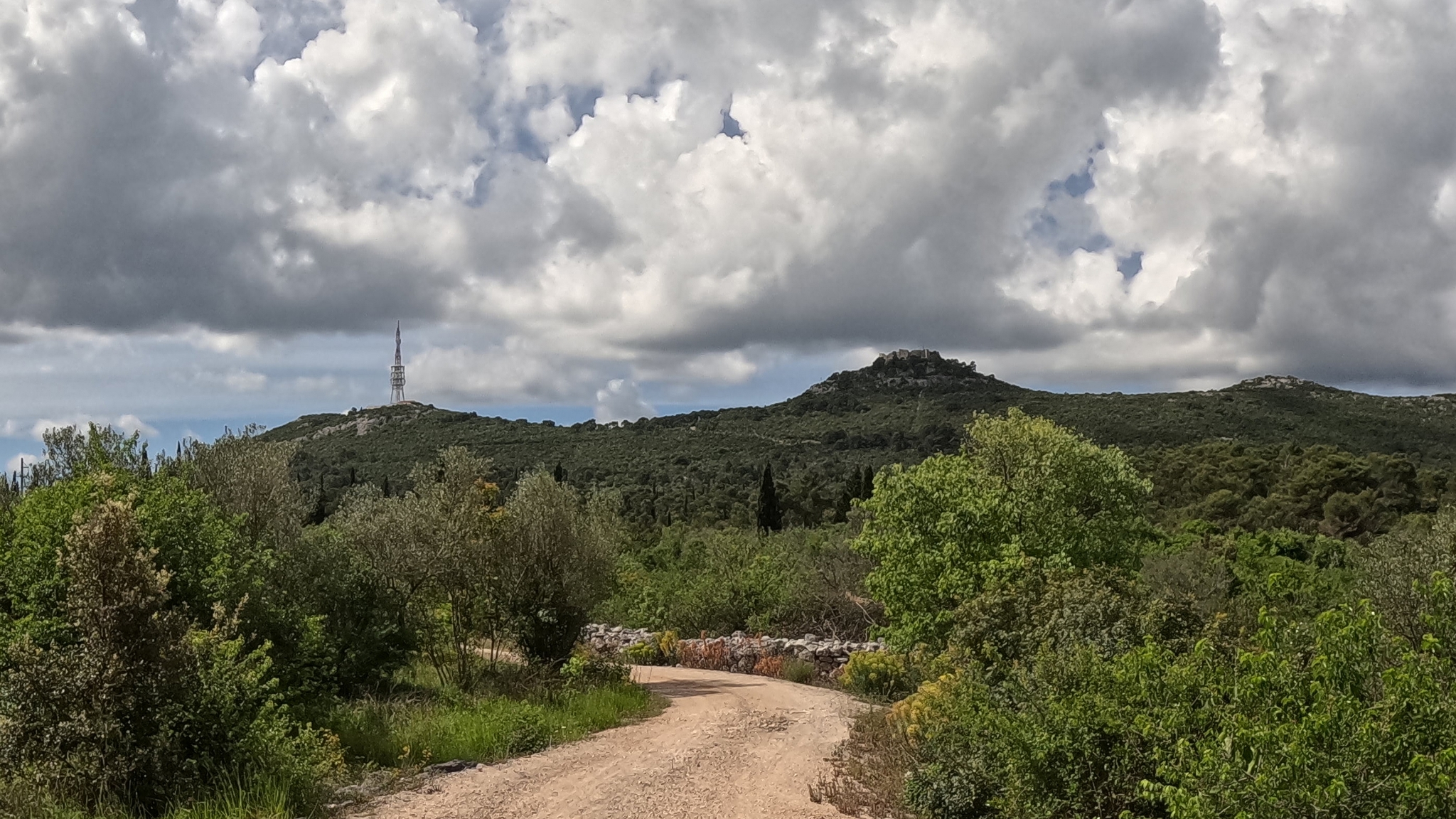
Fortress without telecommunication antennas. New telecommunication tower is on neighbouring hill.

== Sources ==
- Sorić, Sofija (2012). "Kaštel Sv. Mihovila na otoku Ugljanu" [The Fort of St Michael on the Island of Ugljan] (PDF). Ars Adriatica (in Croatian) (2): 85–96.
