= Fort Montbarey =

- Brittany in France
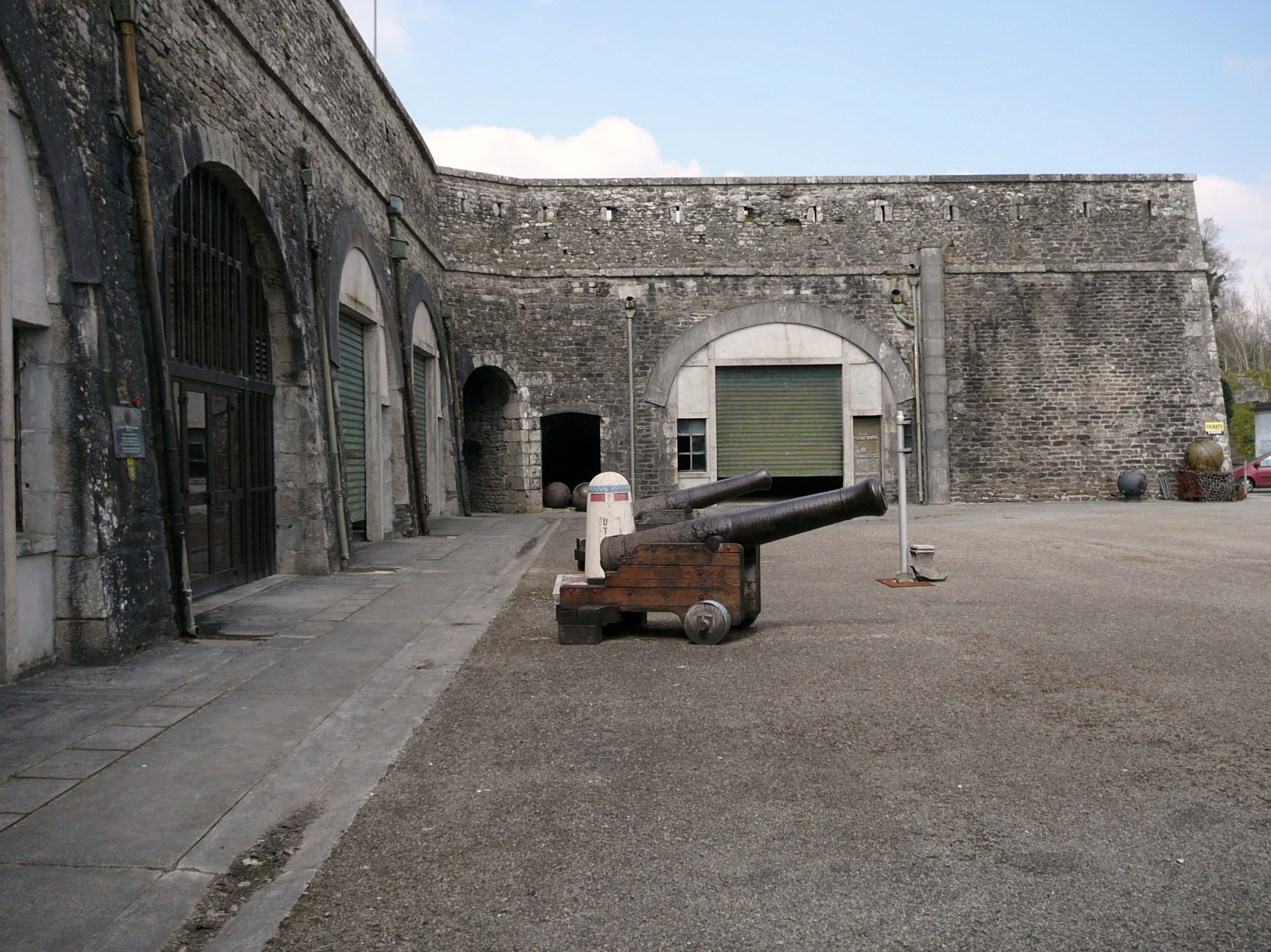
- Fort Montbarey : the interior

Site information
- Type: Fort

Location
- Coordinates: 48.378167°N 4.548211°W

Site history
- Built: 1784

The Fort Montbarey is a fortified stronghold, built between 1777 and 1784, to the west of Brest. The fort is similar to the related Questel Fort.

== History ==
This stronghold, built because Louis XVI wanted to make Brest impregnable, was the most important link in the defense of the city's west side, designed for 500-600 soldiers.

This fort was used by the Germans in 1944, who installed a parachute battalion during the siege of Brest by the Americans. After many assaults and heavy use of tanks and flamethrowers, the garrison surrendered on 16 September 1944.

Rebuilt after World War II, during the Cold War Fort Montbarey hosted the DCA (Defense Against Aircraft) command center of the port of Brest and had in its yard two large bunkers. It also had, at this time, a search radar for aircraft. These facilities were decommissioned in the late 1960s.

In 1984 Fort Montbarey was developed by the Navy into a museum on the history of Finistère during the Second World War, featuring the Resistance effort. An exhibition on "Brest in ruins" is also presented, as well as a "wagon of death" used in the Holocaust and many American vehicles and parts from the DCA (Defence Against Aviation) era, and a British Churchill tank. The museum also manages over 10,000 files and documents on the Resistance, and records on soldiers and victims of the Second World War. It annually hosts more than 10,000 visitors.

The fort is one of a series of strongholds that surround Brest, including Questel Fort.

== Proposed themes ==
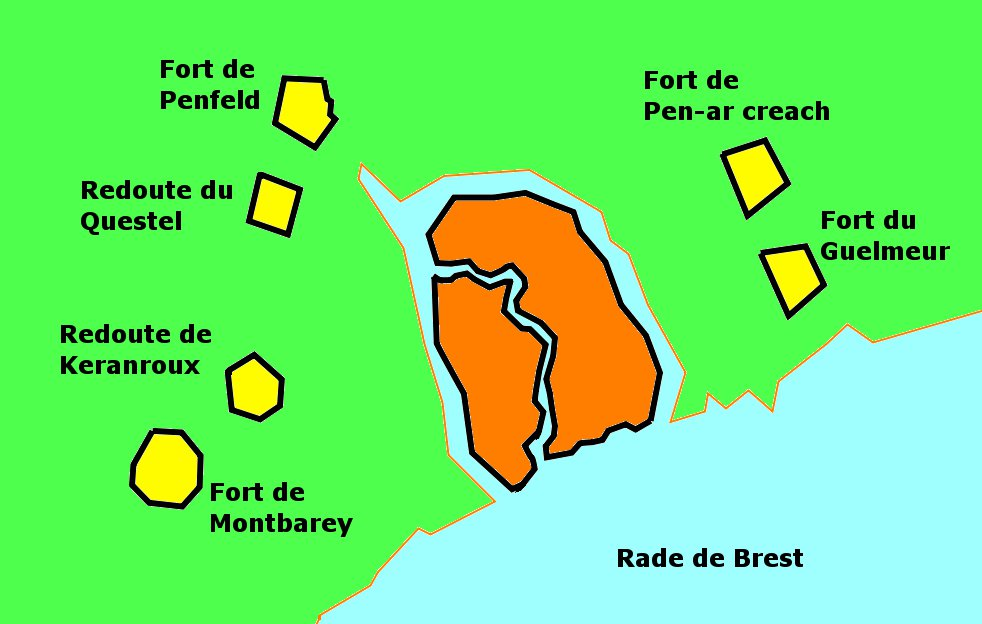
The belt of forts protecting Brest land-side

- Visiting a stronghold of Louis XVI
- Gallery 10000 Finistère died for France
- Tribute to fallen World War Allies
- Photos of Brest in ruins
- Films about Brest at war
- The wagon used in the deportation of Jews during the Holocaust.
- Military vehicles classic
- Various materials of the war 39/45
- Exhibitions
- Models of battle scenes

== Gallery photos ==
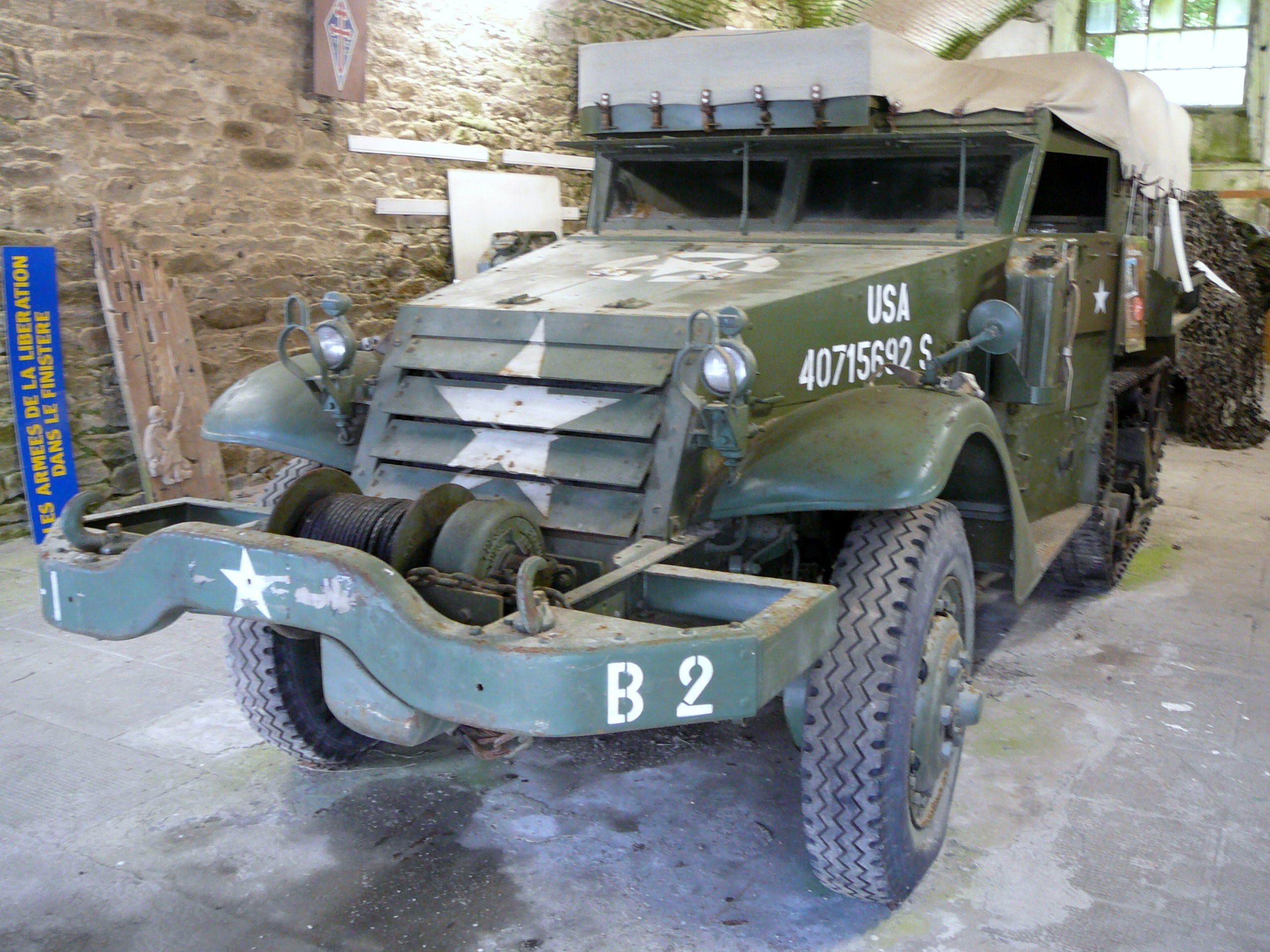
M3 Halftrack

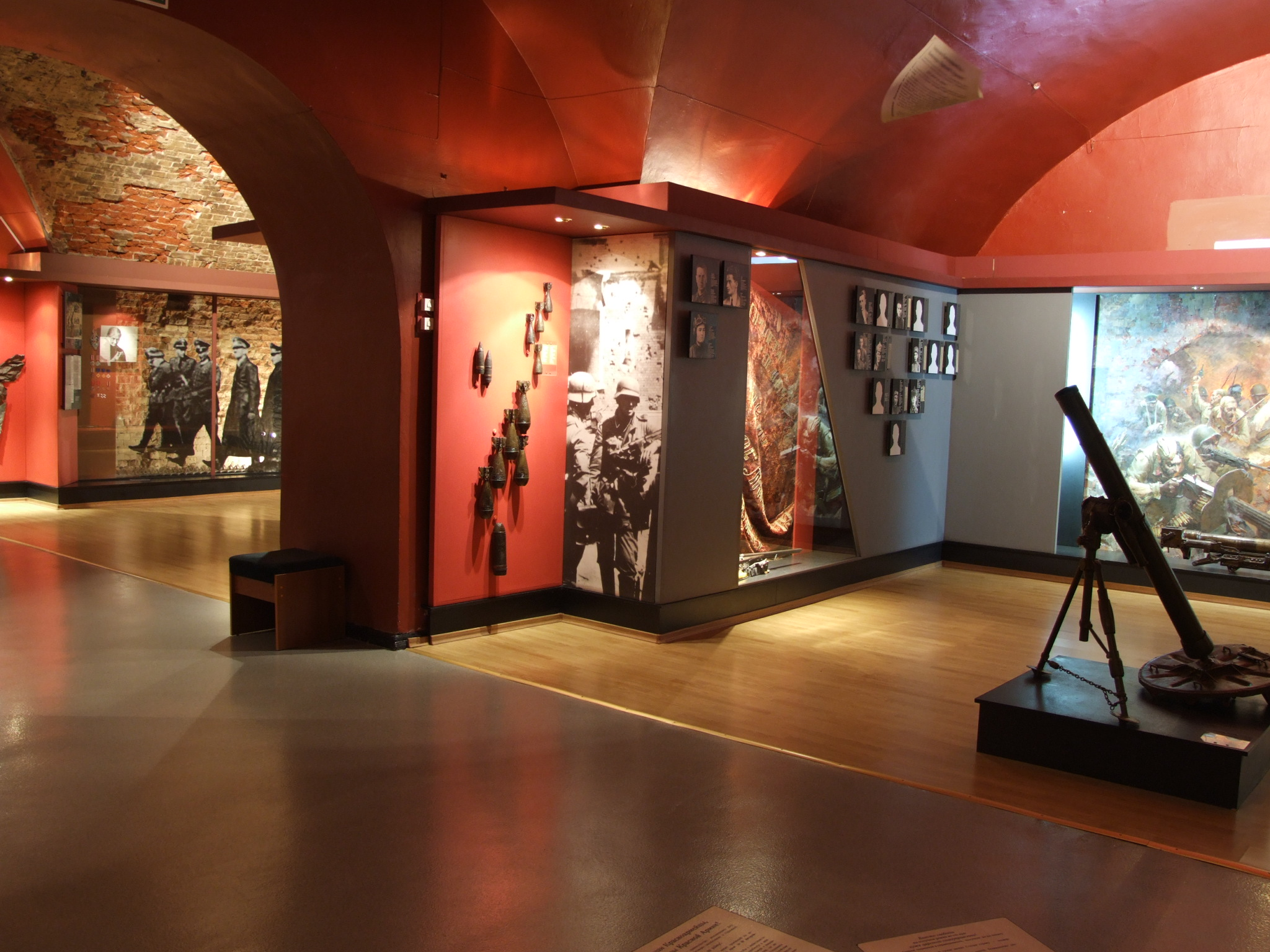
Interior of Museum

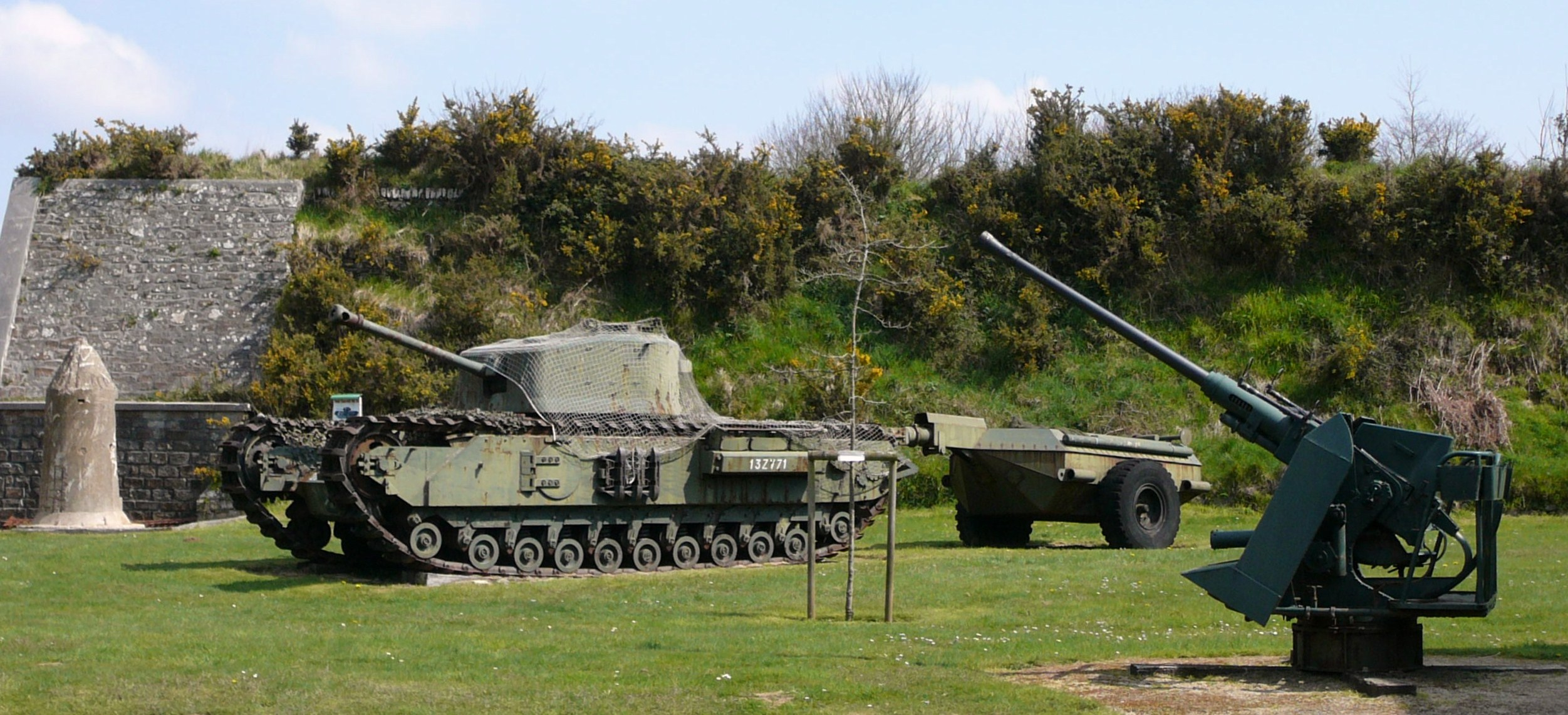
Churchill tank

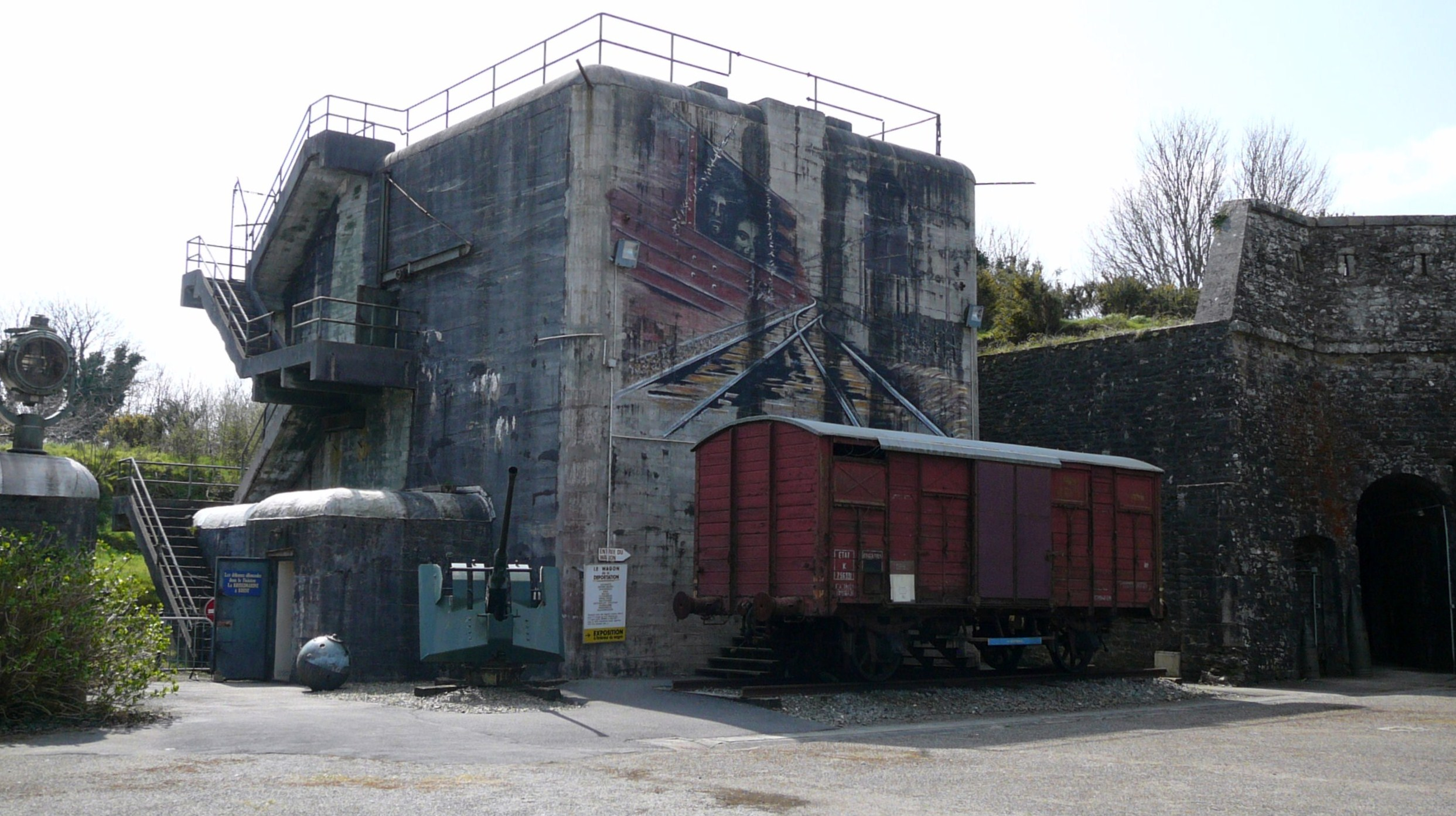
Fort Montbarey

== Bibliography ==
- Lécuillier, Guillaume; et al. (2011), Les fortifications de la rade de Brest: Défense d'une ville-arsenal, Cahiers du patrimoine, vol. 94, Jean-Yves Le Drian (preface), Rennes: Presses universitaires de Rennes, ISBN 978-2-7535-1334-1
