= Questel Fort =

Fort du Questel
- Brittany in France
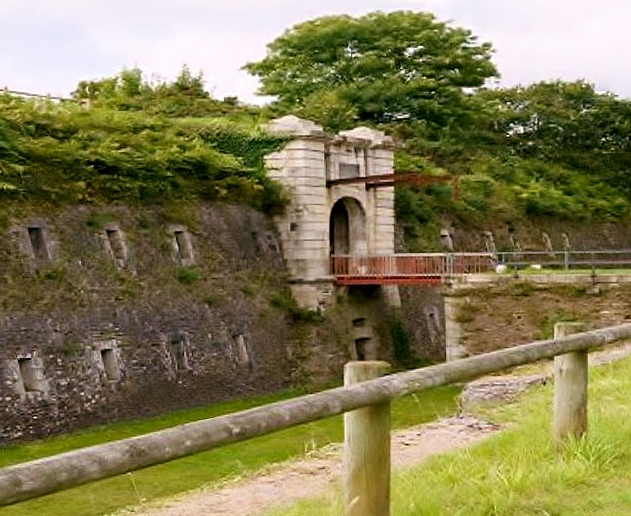
- Fort du Questel

Site information
- Type: Fort

Location
- Location within France
- Coordinates: 48.400574°N 4.533491°W

Site history
- Built: 1783
- Architect: Vauban

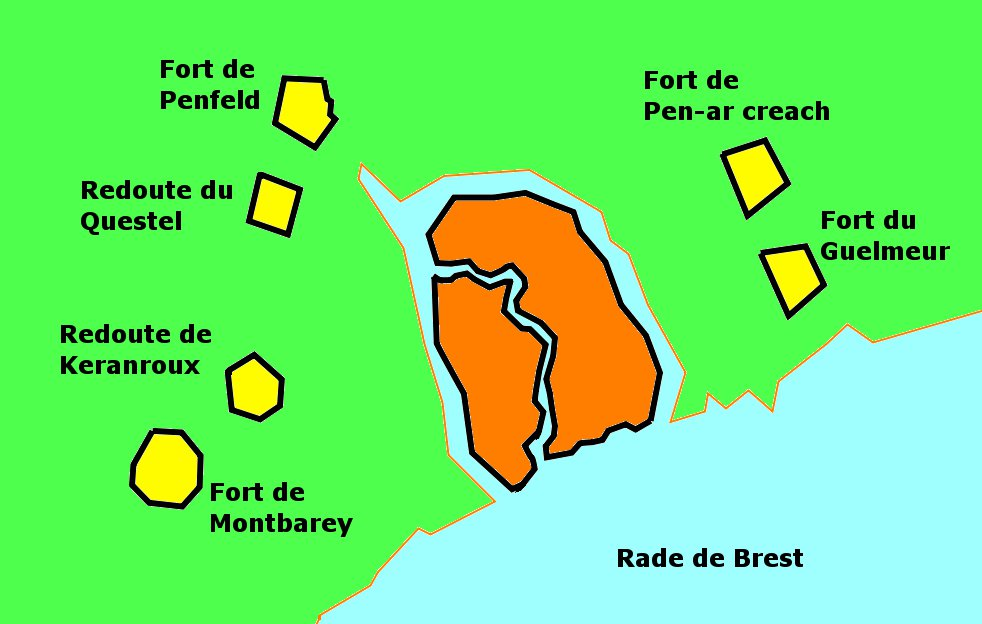
The strong belt surrounding Brest land side

Questel Fort (Fort du Questel; Breton: Kreñvlec'h Questel) is a redoubt in Brest. It is a fortified structure of the Vauban type. It forms a closed square, with the main entry point placed on the least exposed side. This large quadrangle, 100 meters wide, is located between Fort Keranroux (1.5 km south) and Fort Penfeld (1 km to the North-east), and is also part of the same fortifications as Fort Montbarey.

The Fort du Questel monitors the valleys of the Moulin du Buis to prevent any enemies from becoming established and bombarding the city and harbor. Surrounded by deep moats and accessed by a drawbridge, it consists of a masonry wall (scarp), topped by a chemin de ronde, or covered path for musketeers. This path is itself dominated by an earthen rampart, angled to support artillery (26 guns total).

The garrison of about 200 men had access to various galleries, including two large ones underground that connect the central courtyard to the parapets. Note also the presence of toilet facilities, which at the time of Vauban were still a privilege. Built on a six-hectare site, the Fort du Questel dominates the valley of Allégoet, a tributary of the Penfeld. This site is now part of a set of refurbished natural spaces that lead to the banks of the Penfeld by a track passing in front of the Cavale Blanche hospital.

Onsite, the fortress offers walks through its sheltered green moat and its underground galleries, staircases, scarps and counterscarps, esplanade and fresh greenery nearby.

== Gallery ==
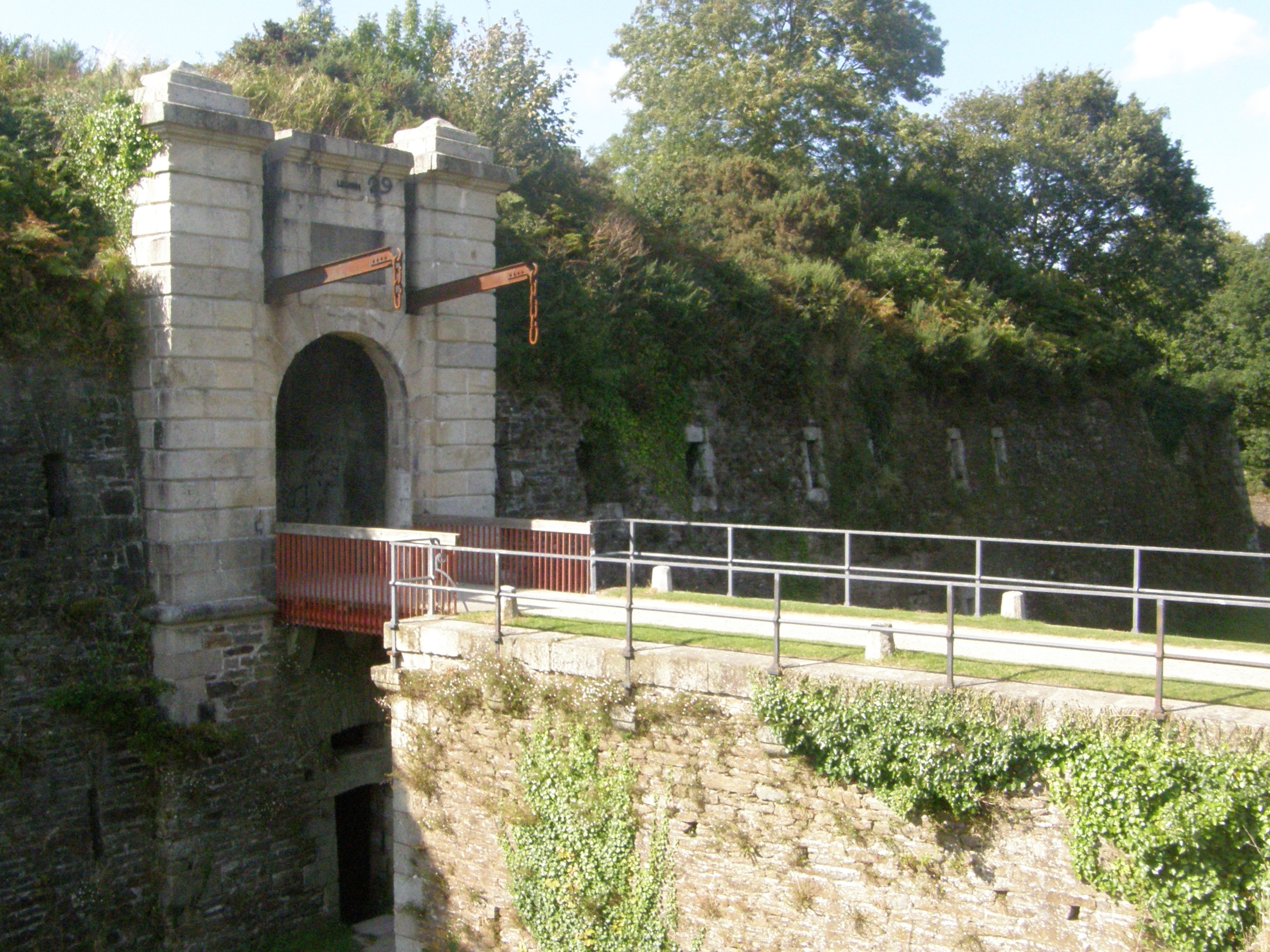
Front gate

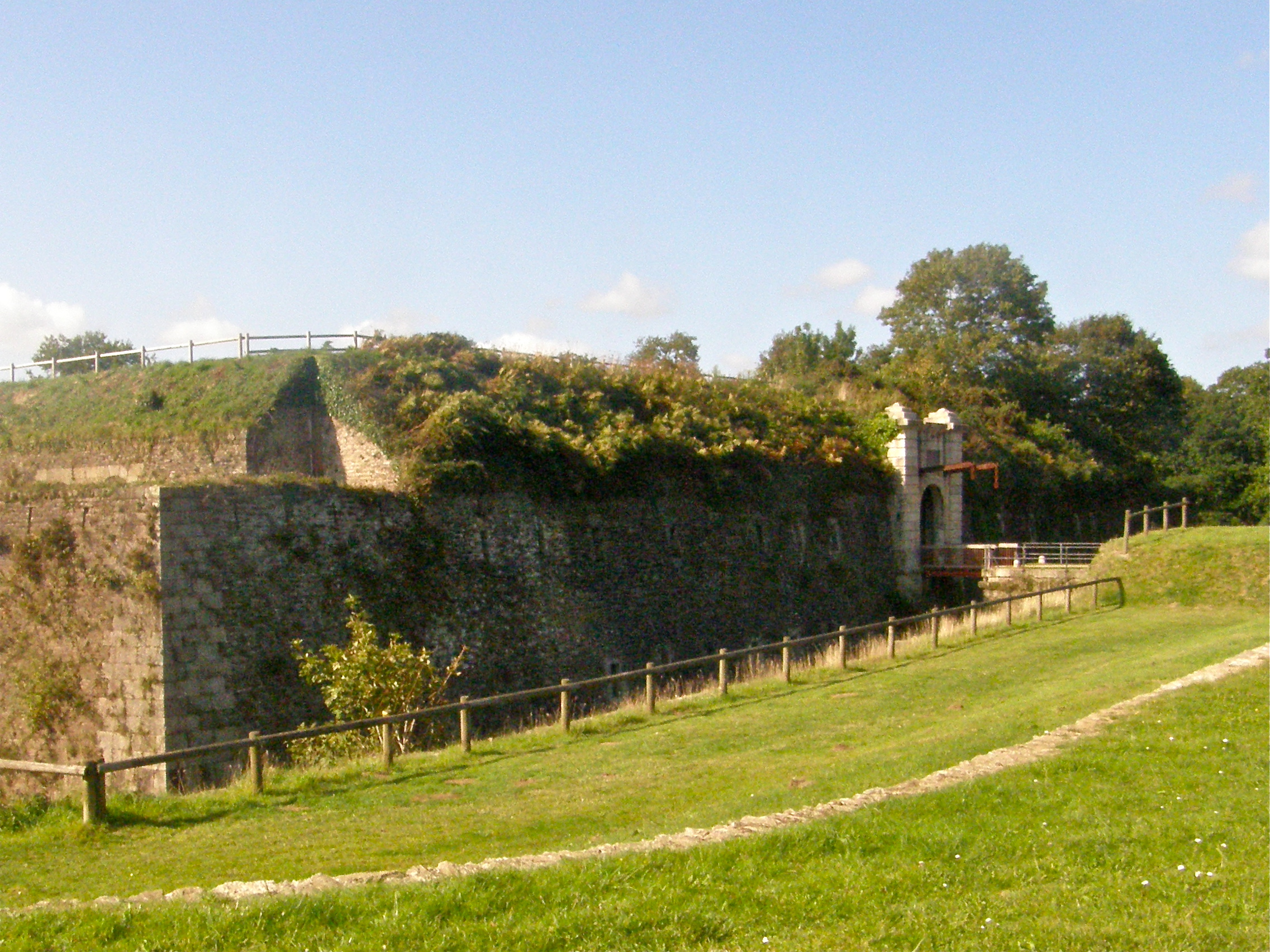
East side of fort (1783)
