= Léopold Maissin =

Léopold Maissin (9 June 1854 - May 1937) was an engineering graduate of the École Polytechnique and industrialist who also became a politician. He served for many years as the mayor of Le Relecq-Kerhuon, a small coastal municipality in the extreme north-west of France. In 1889 he was elected to the departmental council, representing the canton (grouping of municipalities and rural administrative districts) of Landerneau. In 1904 he was elected vice-president of the Departmental council for Finistère. His electoral fortunes were otherwise mixed, but he retained his mayoral position till 1914, at which point he was succeeded in the post by his son (also called Léopold Maissin).

It was not his political career but his career with the Poudrerie nationale de Sevran-Livry that brought his name to wider attention. He distinguished himself as an exceptionally inventive engineer with the explosives manufacturer. In 1907 he became a director of the company's powder mill at Pont-de-Buis-lès-Quimerch, in succession to the engineer-politician Albert Louppe. The munitions firm hit the headlines in connection with the explosions and sinkings, in 1907 and 1911, of the Iéna and the Liberté, two battleships anchored at the vast Toulon naval base. The disasters were traced back to "Powder B" (Nitrocellulose gunpowder), recently introduced to the formulation of explosives used by the navy, and which was found to have become unstable, thus triggering the explosions. Disagreement arose over whether or not the product issues resulted from sub-standard ingredients having been delivered to the "Moulin-Blanc" plant (till 1907 under the control of Léopold Maissin) by the "Pont-de-Buis" factory (at the time when the unstable explosives were produced under the direction, of Albert Louppe), or from failure to implement proper inspections of raw materials delivered to the "Pont-de-Buis" manufacturing plant. The apparently spontaneous sinkings of two major battleships within four years had caught the attention of many influential people both inside and beyond the political establishment: much of the intense and unresolved rancour that ensued between Louppe and Maissin was played out in full public view through the press and other political channels of the time.

== Biography ==
Léopold Emmanuel Louis Eugène Maissin was born in Paris.

=== Political ===
In 1889, standing as a republican candidate, Maissin was elected to membership of the departmental council, representing the canton of Landerneau. His election became contentious in some quarters because workers at Poudrerie nationale's Moulin-Blanc powder mill and agricultural workers from the locality were allegedly placed under "shameless pressure" ("pression éhontée") to vote for him, according to a report in La Presse which appeared on 1 January 1890. He continued to serve as a councillor for well over a dozen years even, in 1904, being elected vice-president of the Departmental council for Finistère. He did not contest the 1913 elections.

On the national scene, Léopold Maissin was a candidate in the by-election triggered by the resignation of the local member of the French national parliament ("Chambre des députés"), Joseph-Marie Boucher. Maissin represented the republicans in the second electoral district ("Deuxième circonscription") of Brest. He was knocked out in the first round of voting however, by the conservative candidate Émile Villiers who secured 7,479 votes to Maisson's 4,460. He stood again in the general election of 20 August 1893, but was again beaten in the first round by Émile Villiers who this time won 6,479 votes against the 3,560 cast for Maissin. In 1908 he was a candidate in the senate elections, but once again he failed to secure election.

=== The engineer and plant director ===
Léopold Maissin was admitted to the prestigious École Polytechnique in 1873. In a decree issued by the Ministry for War dated 6 June 1876, Léopold Maissin was one of six students nominated "élève ingénieur" (literally, "pupil engineer"). In 1890, by now a qualified "ingénieur des poudres" (literally, [explosives] engineer")", Maissin was sent by Ministry for War Charles de Freycinet as a government delegate to Russia as part of the preparation for a Franco-Russian Alliance which would lay the ground work for the important diplomatic and military developments during the first half of the twentieth century. His mission was "to assist the administration of the Imperial [Russian] Artillery with organisation various production facilities for smokeless powder".

Maissin brought an unusual breadth of knowledge and insight to his research at the Poudrerie nationale de Sevran-Livry. A high-point came in 1882 when of the first "peroxydehunting powder" ("poudre de chasse peroxylé"), using a compound of guncotton or cellulose nitrate and "fulmicoton" went on sale. A patent for this invention was lodged on 22 April 1888, bringing it into the industrial and academic mainstream. The new compound formed the basis for what came to be called "Powder-B" explosives ("poudre de guerre") (Note: "Poudre B" ("...blanche" / white powder) as opposed to "Poudre N" ("...noire" / black powder / traditional gun powder).) which was now adopted for use by the navy. Tests were conducted by the explosives engineer and factory director Albert Louppe at the "Moulin-Blanc" munitions plant, located in the Costour Valley which, administratively, came under the control of the municipality of Le Relecq-Kerhuon near Brest after a reconfiguration of local authority boundaries in 1895. With the backing of the French navy major industrial-scale production of "Powder-B" was built up at the "Moulin-Blanc" facility. As the inventor of this important new product, Léopold Maissin was appointed plant director at "Moulin Blanc". Albert Louppe now concentrated his managerial attention on the company's powder mill at Pont-de-Buis-lès-Quimerch.

The cotton-powder used in the manufacturing process came from waste oils from cotton production in England or even sometimes, despite the increasing political tensions across the two sides of the "Hochrhein", from cotton factories in Germany. This dependency on imports was reduced in 1903 with the opening of a French factory for the treatment of cotton waste at Traon-Élorn {Landerneau} along the Élorn estuary. The final decades of the nineteenth century had been years of intensifying nationalism across Europe. Nevertheless, much of the more technically advanced factory investment in France during this period came from abroad: the Traon-Élorn factory was funded by French capital, however. The politician and prominent industrialist Albert Louppe was an important backer. Léopold Maissin, meanwhile, having previously opposed the development, became a backer of the Grande-Palud powder factory a rival enterprise also located in Landerneau, but financed by German investors.

=== Acrimony and Albert Louppe ===
The Finistère explosives manufacturers found themselves on the receiving end of unwelcome nationwide publicity following explosions at the Military port of Toulon of the battleships Iéna in 1907 and Liberté in 1911. The Liberté explosion also caused extensive damage to other battleships anchored nearby. It was reported that along with the damage to the navy ships, the incidents had each caused several hundred deaths. The cause of both explosion was traced back to "Powder B" (Nitrocellulose gunpowder), recently introduced to battleship guns in place of "Powder N" (traditional gunpowder), which was determined to have become unstable over time. Léopold Maissin, who had taken over from Albert Louppe as plant director of the powder mill at Pont-de-Buis-lès-Quimerch, insisted that the catastrophic explosions at Toulon had resulted from failures in the manufacturing process at Pont-de-Buis. The key ingredient in "Powder B" was cotton-powder, processed from cotton waste at the "Moulin blanc", where Maissin had been in charge till 1907. On taking over at the "Powder B" factory in 1907, Maissin stated, noticed that he had identified a problem with the cotton-powder being used. Old and defective cotton-powder was being chemically rejuvenated and then used for the manufacture of "Powder B". Maissin, who regarded this practice as highly risky, had put an end to it. However, the explosions at the Toulon naval base in 1907 and 1911 had resulted from the condition of "Powder B" that had been sold and delivered to the navy when Albert Louppe was responsible for the manufacturing plant. Reports surfaced that the container for the "Powder B" implicated were marked with a code signifying "Second Batch of 1906, Pont-de-Buis."

Subjected to questioning by members of parliament and by the departmental council ("conseil général") for Finistère, Léopold Maissin expressed himself on the matter in detail and at length. He added that he had sent several reports expressing his concern about the use of defective ingredients in the manufacture of "Powder B" on his predecessor's watch, but his reports had been "stifled" ("étouffés") because those responsible were reluctant for the navy to have to throw away large quantities of expensive explosives. In 1911 he told the departmental council ("conseil général") for Finistère (whose members included Albert Louppe that on 20 March 1907, eight days before the Iéna disaster, he had addressed a letter to Gaston Thomson, the government minister with responsibility for the navy, highlighting problems with several consignments of "Powder B", identifying the officials to be singled out for questioning and spelling out the threats to the navy. (Note: "... le 20 mars 1907, huit jours avant la catastrophe du "Iéna", il avait, dans une lettre à Gaston Thomson, alors ministre de la Marine, signalé les malfaçons d'une certain nombre de lots de "poudre B", les responsables à frapper et les menaces qui pesaient sur notre marine".) A number of further complications were adduced concerning who had said what when to whom and the extent to which Maissin's attempts to alert government to the risks really had been stifled. At least one report of the matter from 1911 also mentions an already long-standing animosity between Léopold Maissin and Albert Louppe.

Général Gaudin, a soldier-politician who at this time was serving as the national director responsible for "powders and saltpetres", was mandated by the minister for war to review Maissin's accusations. Gaudin's investigations were summarized in a report dated 5 November 1911: his work had included a meticulous audit of the various letters that Maissin had submitted to a succession of ministers for war, (Note: Six men served in rapide succession as minister for war in France between 1906 and 1912, under three different heads of government ("Présidents du Conseil des Ministres").)and others in positions of national authority, over the previous four and a half years. In order to try and simplify matters, the report (Note: The report conclusions were reproduced, apparently in full, in the Journal des débats politiques et littéraires of 15 November 1911) suggested that the criticisms and accusations of Maissin might best be classified under three headings:

- I. Reprehensible or even fraudulent practices followed by M.Louppe:

a) on the one hand in respect of the Powder-B manufacturing processes in place at "Pont-de-Buis"
b) on the other hand with regard to the [principal ingredient, the] cotton-powder when this same engineer [by implication, Albert Louppe again] took over from M.Maissin at "Moulin-Blanc".

- II. Irregular or even fraudulent procedures set in place by M.Louppe in respect of accepting at the goods-in department consignments of powder that were not of sufficient condition to be acceptable.
- III. Deficient manufacturing processes identified by the authorities ("...par le services des poudres"): insufficient controls at goods-in ("Insufficance des conditions de réception").

Albert Louppe responded with accusations against Léopold Maissin, as director at "Moulin-Blanc" before the switching of their responsibilities, and thereby then supplier of poor quality cotton-powder, of having been the originator of the poor quality of the "Powder-B" for which the cotton-powder had been the key ingredient. The controversy festered between the two men and more widely in the public space. There was a public interest in avoiding damaging rivalry between Louppe and Maissin. The ministry had already, in 1906, intervened to keep them apart in 1906 by sending Léopold Maissin to take charge of the powder mill at Lille, while the director of the Lille facility was sent to take charge at "Moulin-Blanc". Maissin had returned to Finistère during 1907, however. In 1911 The government responded to the increasingly public nature of the dispute by ordering the dismissal of both men a couple of days after receiving Gaudin's report.

That report was followed by a parliamentary commission of enquiry. Camille Chautemps reported on behalf of the commission which noted that the revelations of Léopold Maissin had confirmed the presence of "indiscipline that was rife in certain powder mills because their directors flattered their unionised work forces in order to obtain their electoral support". (Note: une "indiscipline qui régnait dans certaines poudreries, du fait que les directeurs flattaient les syndicats ouvriers pour obtenir leur appui électoral".) The political ambitions of the two directors caught up in the matter, Albert Louppe and Léopold Maissin, were in that sense a direct cause of the explosions at Toulon harbour. There was, the commission found, no risk inherent in the formulation of "Powder B". Responding with the careful precision for which this former lawyer and freemason was known, the minister for war Alexandre Millerand accepted the commission's findings and undertook to set down a set of "uniform rules" for the manufacture of "Powder B". Millerand added that during a recent visit to (a rival plant in) Angoulême he had been made aware of recent (unspecified) improvements in the production processes that within a few months would enable the French manufacturers to match the standards of the best in the world.

== Personal ==
Léopold Maissin married Eugénie Vincent. The marriage is known to have been followed by the birth of at least one child: their son Léopold Albert Marie Alexandre Maissin was born on 14 October 1879.
