= Albert Louppe =

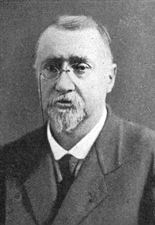
- Born: Jules Albert Louppe; 6 June 1856; Guny, Aisne, France
- Died: 5 July 1927 (aged 71); Laval, Mayenne, France
- Occupations: Explosives engineer Industrialist; Politician
- Spouse: Hortense Gabrielle Steff
- Children: 4

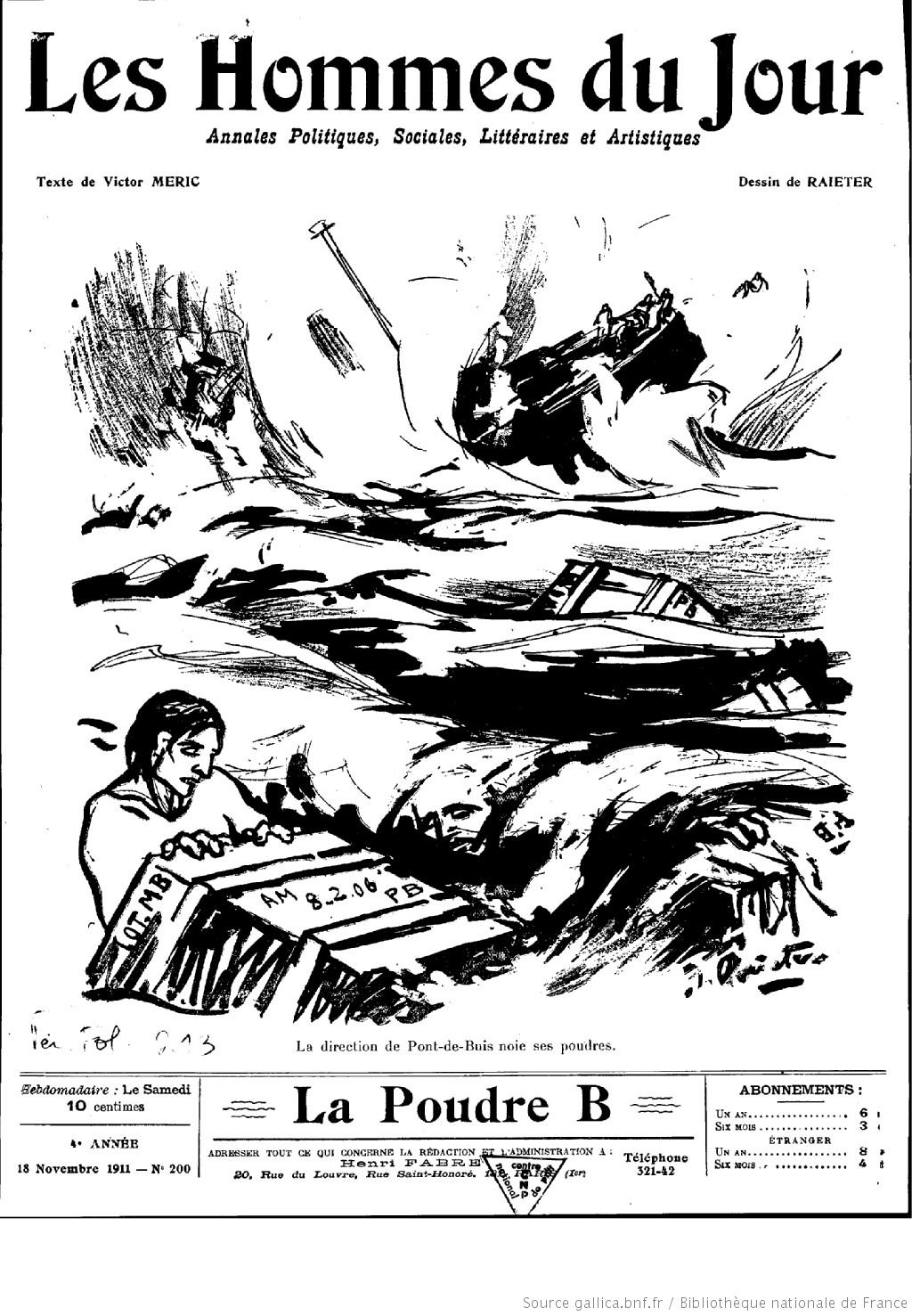
"La direction de Pont-de-Buis noie ses poudres" Cartoon caricature concerning the alleged poor quality of "Powder B" (high explosive) which had been implicated in the explosions of the battleships Iéna (1907) and Liberté (1911) at Toulon.

Jules Albert Louppe (6 June 1856 – 5 July 1927) was a French explosives engineer who became a politician. The Plougastel Bridge, or Albert-Louppe Bridge, near Brest in north-western France, is named after him.

== Life ==
=== Early years ===
Jules Albert Louppe was born into a peasant family in Guny, in the French department of Aisne. His schooling commenced nearby at Soissons, from where he won a place at the prestigious Collège Sainte-Barbe in Paris, later progressing to the national École Polytechnique. At the age of 19 he emerged from the École Polytechnique as a qualified explosives engineer.

=== The industrialist ===
By 1883 he had relocated to Finistère, where he became the General Director of the "Moulin-Blanc" (explosives) Powder mill in the Costour Valley at Le Relecq-Kerhuon near Brest. He later moved on to take over the Powder mill at Pont-de-Buis, but returned in 1905 to the "Moulin-Blanc", where working now as Chief Engineer, he remained till 1911.

=== Scandal ===
Louppe's involvement in the manufacture of gunpowder brought him unwelcome publicity in the national press following the explosions of the battleships Iéna in 1907 and Liberté in 1911. The Liberté explosion also caused extensive damage to other battleships anchored nearby in Toulon Harbour. Following lengthy investigation, the cause of the explosion was traced back to "Powder B" (Nitrocellulose gunpowder), recently introduced to battleship guns during the arms race at the beginning of the twentieth century, which was determined to have become unstable over time. Bitter and very public arguments erupted between Léopold Maissin and Albert Louppe. Maissin had succeeded Loupe as director of the "Moulin-Blanc" powder mill, and the kernel of the argument was over whether sub-standard ingredients delivered to the "Moulin-Blanc" plant by the "Pont-de-Buis" had caused the resulting Powder B produced by the "Moulin-Blanc" plant to become unstable. Loupe and Maissin each blamed one another and the national press ran with the story. Although the two men shifted their positions, the very public rancour between them continued, and in the end both men were retired from their directorships. Albert Louppe was urged by the government to take over the Powder mill at Saint-Médard, but he declined the offer, preferring, at least for the time being, to retire.

The rivalry with Léopold Maissin was both professional and political. Albert Louppe was non-aligned, but by most criteria a conservative left-winger, while Maissin was a Radical-Socialist Republican. Their antipathy was played out not merely in the media, but also in the departmental council of Finistère to which both had been elected as regional deputies, and where Louppe represented the canton of Faou between 1901 and 1927.

=== The politician ===
After a period as a town councillor in Guipavas from 1884, in 1888 Louppe was elected a municipal councillor in Quimerc'h, subsequently becoming mayor of the little commune, an office he would retain, in tandem with his other duties, till his death.

In addition to his work in municipal politics, he was elected to the departmental council of Finistère in 1901, becoming president of the council in 1912. He worked hard to obtain government funding for major transport links and for improvements at the (strategically important) Port of Brest. In 1922 he mandated the first studies for a possible bridge to provide a direct connection from Plougastel-Daoulas to Brest, crossing over the Élorn estuary. Work on the bridge started in 1926. Louppe did not live to see it completed, but when it was opened to traffic in 1930 the bridge was nevertheless named after him.

Louppe's career in national politics took off in 1914 when he was elected a Deputy representing the second electoral district (Châteaulin) of Finistère, in the process unseating the anti-Dreyfusard Charles Daniélou. In the Chamber he sat with the Radical Left group, and backed the Clemenceau government for all the important votes. His name was not included on the candidates listing for the 1919 election. In 1921 he was elected to the Senate for Finistère. In the senate he sat with the Republican left. He played an important role in the Commission of Public Works.

=== Personal ===
On 11 December 1885, at Brest, Albert Louppe married Hortense Gabrielle Steff, the daughter of a wine merchant originally from Moselle, in the east. However, following the Franco-Prussian War and the frontier changes mandated in the Treaty of Frankfurt, the Steffs had found themselves living in Germany. Families were given until October 1872 to decide whether they wished to become Germans or to retain their French citizenship and relocate to what remained of France. It was in response to this choice that Henriette Catherine Steff and her family relocated to Brest.

Following their marriage, Albert and Hortense Louppe had four recorded children.

Albert Louppe died just outside Laval in July 1927 while visiting friends. He had been predeceased by his wife a couple of years earlier, and was buried with her in the Steff family burial plot at the Cemetery of St Martin (Square 16) in Brest.
