= Pont de l'Iroise =

- The Pont de l'Iroise, seen from the Plougastel end of the pont Albert-Louppe looking north-east and upriver
- Coordinates: 48°23′15″N 04°23′52″W
- Carries: N165 road
- Crosses: Élorn
- Locale: Finistère
- Owner: Finistère DDE (Direction Départementale de l'Equipement), Ministry of Public Works
- Maintained by: Finistère DDE
- Preceded by: pont Albert-Louppe

Characteristics
- Design: cable-stayed
- Material: Reinforced concrete, steel
- Total length: 800.05 metres (2,624 ft 10 in)
- Width: 23.1 metres (75 ft 9 in)
- Height: 113 metres (370 ft 9 in)
- Longest span: 400 metres (1,312 ft 4 in)
- No. of spans: 7
- Piers in water: 2
- Clearance below: 26.5 metres (86 ft 11 in)

History
- Architect: René Le Friant, René Terzian
- Designer: Michel Placidi
- Engineering design by: Alain Chauvin; Service d'Etudes Techniques des Routes et Autoroute, SOGELERG
- Constructed by: Demathieu et Bard; Groupe Razel; Pico
- Construction start: 1991
- Construction end: 1994
- Construction cost: 264 million Francs

Location
- Interactive map of Pont de l'Iroise

The Pont de l'Iroise (French pronunciation: [pɔ̃ də liʁwaz], literally Bridge of the Iroise) is a cable-stayed bridge in Finistère, Brittany, France, which spans the Élorn river where it enters the roadstead of Brest. It carries route nationale 165, the road between Brest and Quimper, and connects Le Relecq-Kerhuon to the north with Plougastel-Daoulas to the south. The bridge is named after the Iroise Sea, into which the roadstead of Brest opens.

== See also ==
- List of bridges in France
