= Route nationale 165 =

Road in France

Route nationale 165 is a highway in Brittany, France. It connects the towns of Brest and Nantes. It is also numbered European Route 60. The majority of the route is autoroute standard.

== Route ==
The road starts at the docks of Brest and passes the Oceanopolis aquarium and the Botanical Gardens. Then it turns south, crossing the Élorn river by the Pont de l'Iroise bridge. The older Pont A. Louppe bridge, dedicated to pedestrians and cyclists, lies on the seaward side.

The road passes through Plougastel Daoulas and alongside the coast in the Parc naturel régional d'Armorique. The road passes Châteaulin and junctions with N164 to Rennes and the N12. The former road is now RD770. The road enters Quimper and crosses the Odet river, Quimper's eastern bypass.

The road continues south-east with the old road now RD783 to the south, and after Quimperlé it becomes RD765, crossing Laïta river. It then passes Lann-Bihoué airport and forms the northern bypass for Lorient over Scorff and Blavet rivers past Hennebont and a junction with N24. The old road continues as RD765 through the centre of Lorient and Hennebont, re-joins the new road after Landévant.

The road continues south-east to Vannes on Gulf of Morbihan's northern shore. It crosses N166. The old road is again numbered RD765, passing through villages bypassed by the new road.

The road bypasses Muzillac and crosses Vilaine river, passing La Roche Bernard. The former road was renamed RD965. The road passes Pontchateau. At Savenay, it junctions with N171 to La Baule and Laval. The road passes the Loire-Atlantique motor racing circuit before entering Nantes, becoming A844.
