= Sizun Parish close =

Coordinates: 48.4057°N 4.0782°W

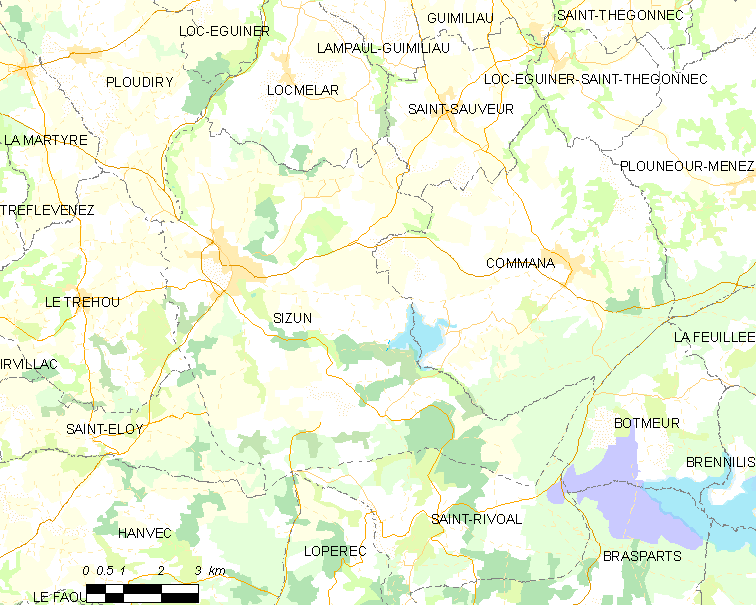
Map showing the location of Sizun

The Sizun Parish close (Enclos paroissial) is located at Sizun in the arrondissement of Morlaix in Brittany in north-western France. The "enclos paroissial" or parish close comprises the Église Saint-Suliau, a sacristy, an ossuary or funeral chapel and a "porte triomphale" giving access to the enclosure. The enclosure is a listed historical monument since 1943.

== The entrance to the enclosure ==
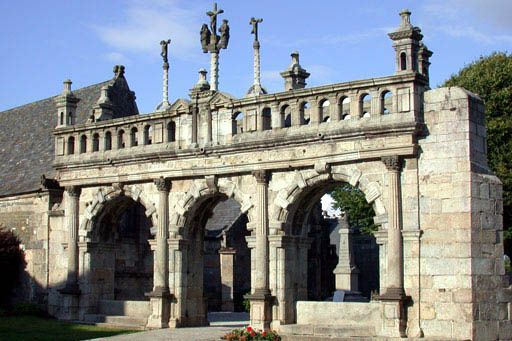
The elaborate entrance to the Sizun enclosure

Access to the Sizun "enclos paroissial" is through an "Arc de Triomphe" like structure with a total length of 15 metres, built between 1585 and 1590. A life size reproduction of the Sizun entrance was shown at the 1989 "Commémoration du Bicentenaire de la Révolution française" held in Paris' Jardins des Tuileries. The structure has three arches separated by fluted columns with Corinthian capitals and is surmounted by a double stone balustrade from which emerge the three crosses of a Calvary. At each corner of the balustrade is a "Lanteron" (a lantern-lke structure). The upper gallery of the "Arc de Triomphe" was accessed by a stone stairway so priests would have been able to preach from there in the open air but this was removed several years ago to assist the flow of traffic.

== The Pietà of the Église Saint-Suliau ==
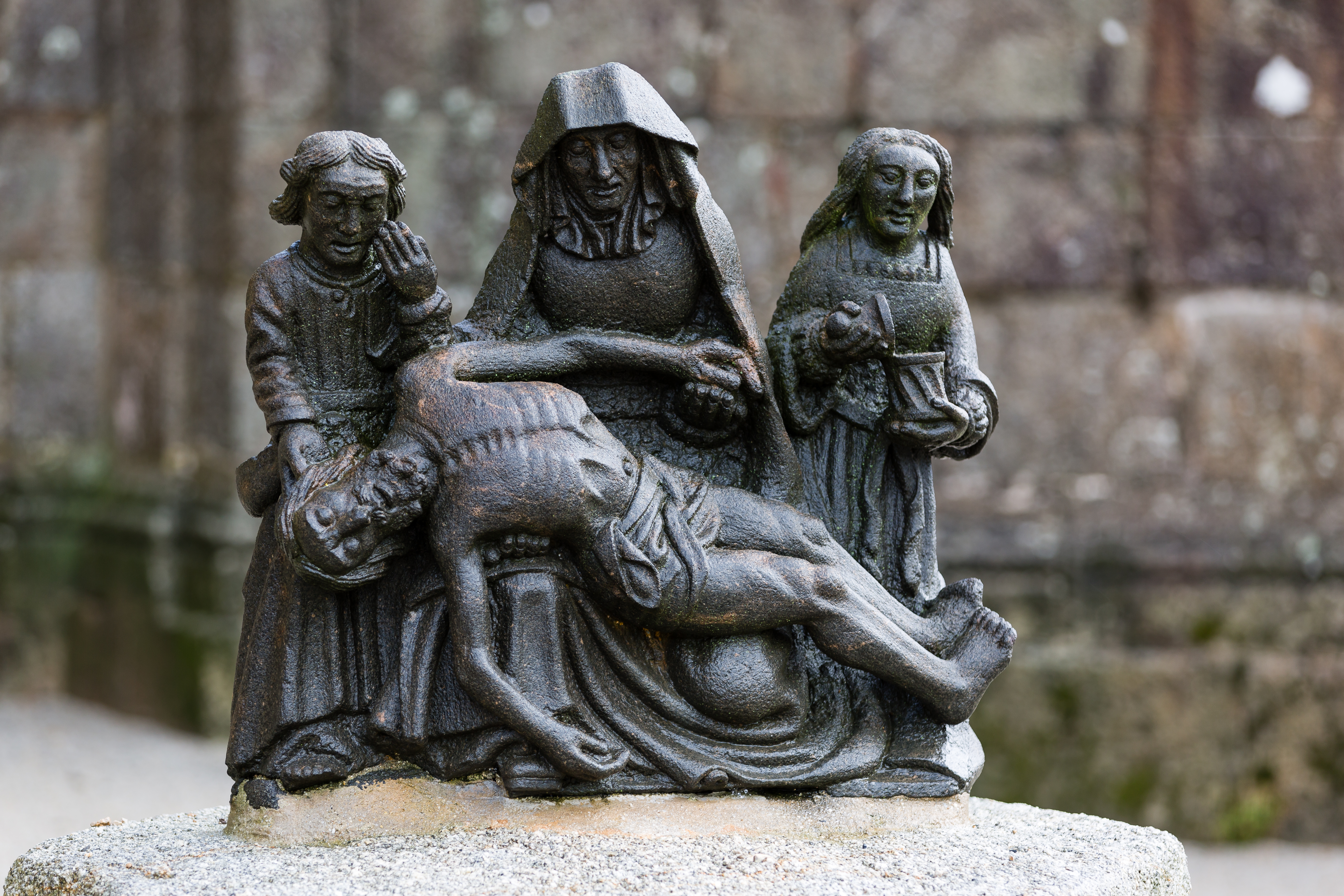
The Pietà on the lawn outside the Église Saint-Suliau

The enclosure was thought to have had the usual elaborate calvary in earlier times and a Pietà, as shown here, is thought to be what is left of that calvary apart from a head of a "bad" robber found in the ossuary. In the cemetery is an empty granite pedestal thought to have supported a Calvary, this inscribed "LAN MIL.V:XXXX:R.P.LA MISSION 1858". In the pietà, John the Evangelist puts one hand on Jesus' head and with his other hand wipes the tears from his cheek. Mary Magdalene is shown lifting the top from her pot of ointment. There is also a small statue of Saint-Suliau outside the church.

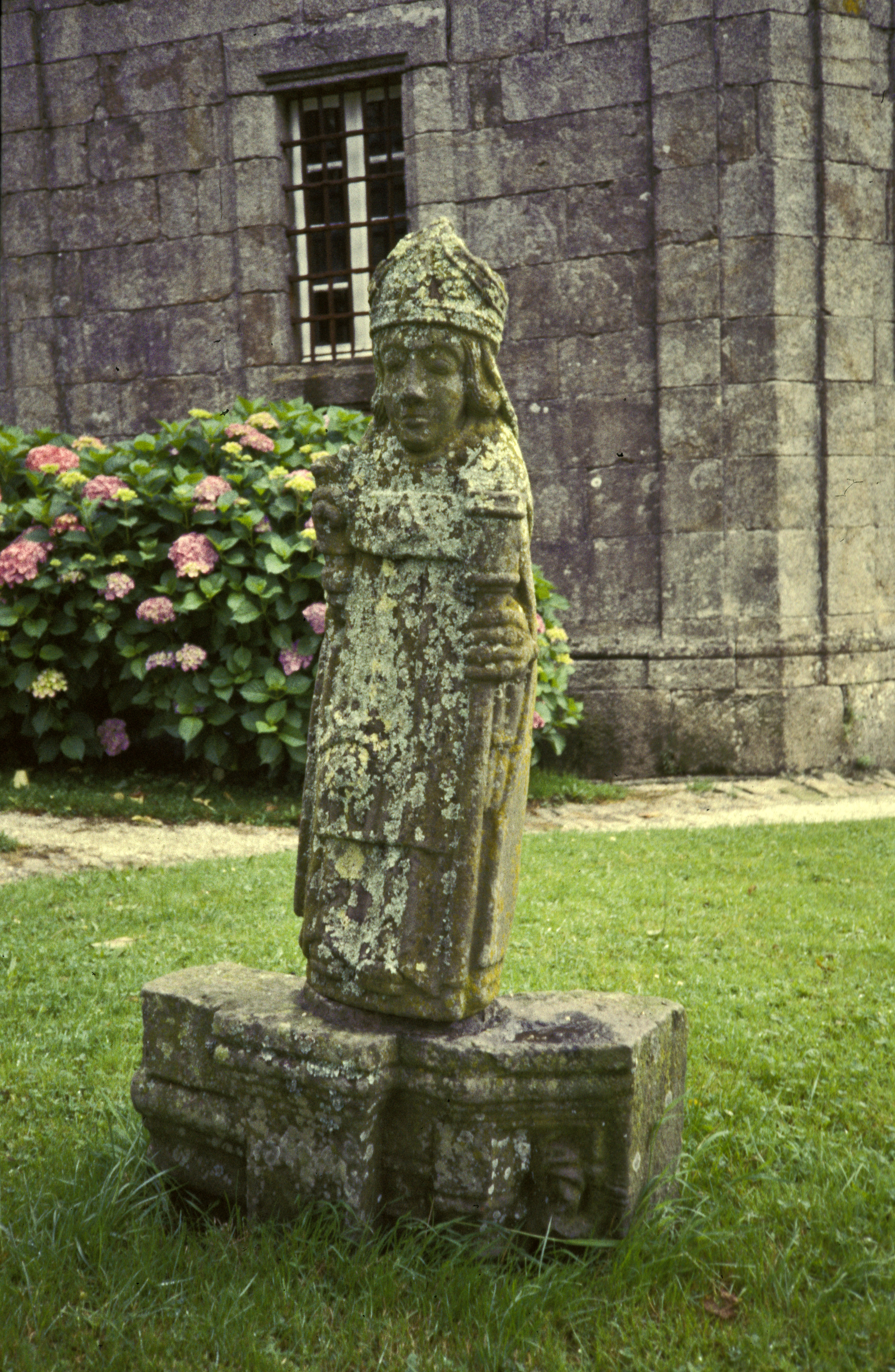
One of the many statues of Saint Suliau, this located on the lawn outside the church

== The ossuary ==
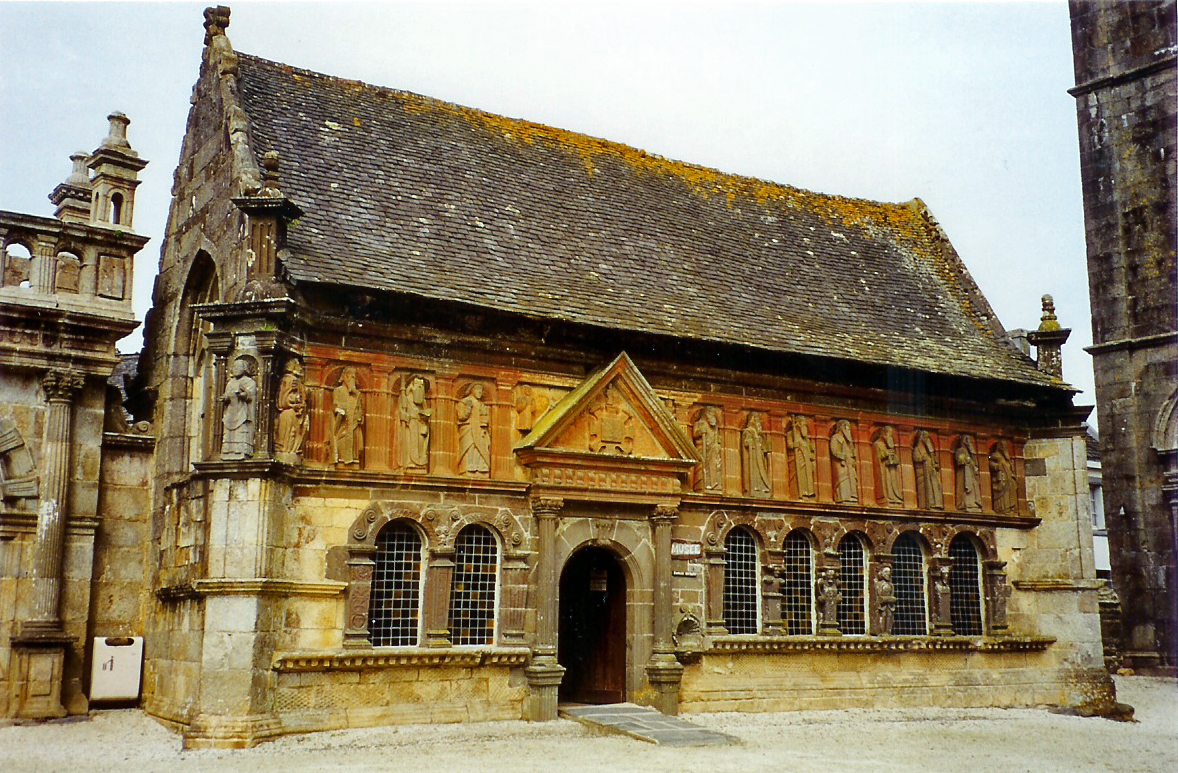
The Sizun ossuary

The ossuary chapel is located in the western part of the cemetery, and was built between 1585 and 1588. The ossuary door has decorated, fluted columns topped with Corinthian capitals on either side, and over this door is an entablature with the Rohan coat of arms in a triangular pediment and a small statue of Saint Suliau. Outside of the pediment are 1588 depictions of the Franciscans, Saint Francis of Assisi and Saint Anthony of Padua. Saint Francis shows his stigmata and Saint Anthony holds a chalice or ciborium. There are inscriptions by the Rohan coat of arms. One reads "Memento Mori", and the others in French remind visitors that they are in the presence of the dead ("Souviens-toi qu'il faut mourir" – Remember that you will die), and ("Vous nos enfants qui par ici passés, souvenez-vous que nous sommes trépassés" – You, our children who pass through here, remember that we are dead). The lower level of the building is built with yellow granite honeycomb stone and has arched windows separated by pilasters, some with caryatids depicting women who are naked apart from the scrolls they hold. Along the upper level of the building are twelve niches with fluted Doric pilasters between them and in these niches are statues of the twelve apostles, Saint Peter is depicted with a key, Saint Andrew with a cross, Saint James the Greater with a seashell, Saint John with a chalice, Saint James the Lesser with a stick, Saint Mathias with a pastoral staff, Saint Phillip with a cross, Saint Bartholomew with knife, Saint Matthew with some scales, Saint Simon with a saw, Judas Iscariot with a sword and Saint Thomas with a set-square. The ossuary is now used as a museum devoted to Breton Art and Culture. On a buttress on the south east corner there is a statue of Saint Suliau holding a cup.

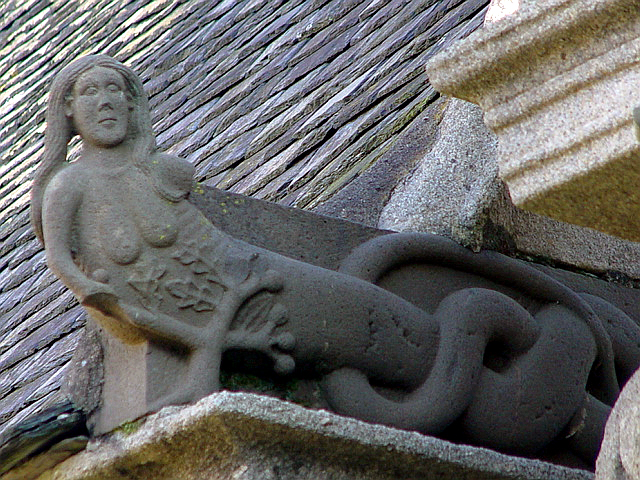
This sculpture decorates the ossuary. The demon has the bust of a woman and the body of a serpent and is shown plucking the apple from the tree of the Temptation

== The church ==
The Église St Suliau was constructed in stages between the 16th and 17th centuries. The church's best feature is the 16th century southern porch built in the flamboyant gothic style in 1514. The church boasts five altarpieces, a Thomas Dallam organ dating to 1683 and some exquisite furnishings and there is a showcase in the north transept containing many artifacts including the solid silver bust of Saint Suliau shown in the gallery of images at the end of the article. The main altar has twisted pink columns on either side and includes images of the Virgin Mary and Joseph with the baby Jesus and statues of Saint Peter and Saint Paul on either side of the tabernacle. There are also depictions of the four Evangelists with their attributes of a bull, a lion, a child and an eagle. Above Joseph and the baby Jesus is a statue of Saint Suliau. One of the altarpieces is dedicated to Saint Augustine and at the top of this altarpiece Jesus holds a terrestrial globe and turns his head to the main altar nearby. This altarpiece is carved from Lava limestone whilst all the other altarpieces in the church are carved from oak. Another of the altarpieces deals with Jesus' baptism and nearby are statues of Saint Yves, Saint Peter, Saint Guillaume and Saint Maudetz. The sabliéres, the beams that sit below the ceiling and above the stone walls of churches, are partly made of wood and richly decorated. In the corners angels are depicted holding some of the instruments of the passion, a traditional embellishment in the art of the area around the river Élorn. The altarpiece of the Rosary in the south transept is the work of the sculptor Jean Berthouloux and features statues of Saint Dominique and Saint Catherine of Siena. There is a depiction of the Virgin Mary and child in the upper part of the altarpiece surrounded by two angels. Opposite this altarpiece is the oldest statue of Saint Suliau in the church. The altarpiece known as the "Agonisants" in the north transept depicts the death of a believer in the presence of Dom Michel le Nobletz, the Breton missionary. The composition includes statues of Saint Peter and Saint Paul and is topped with a statue of Joseph.

== The Sacristy ==
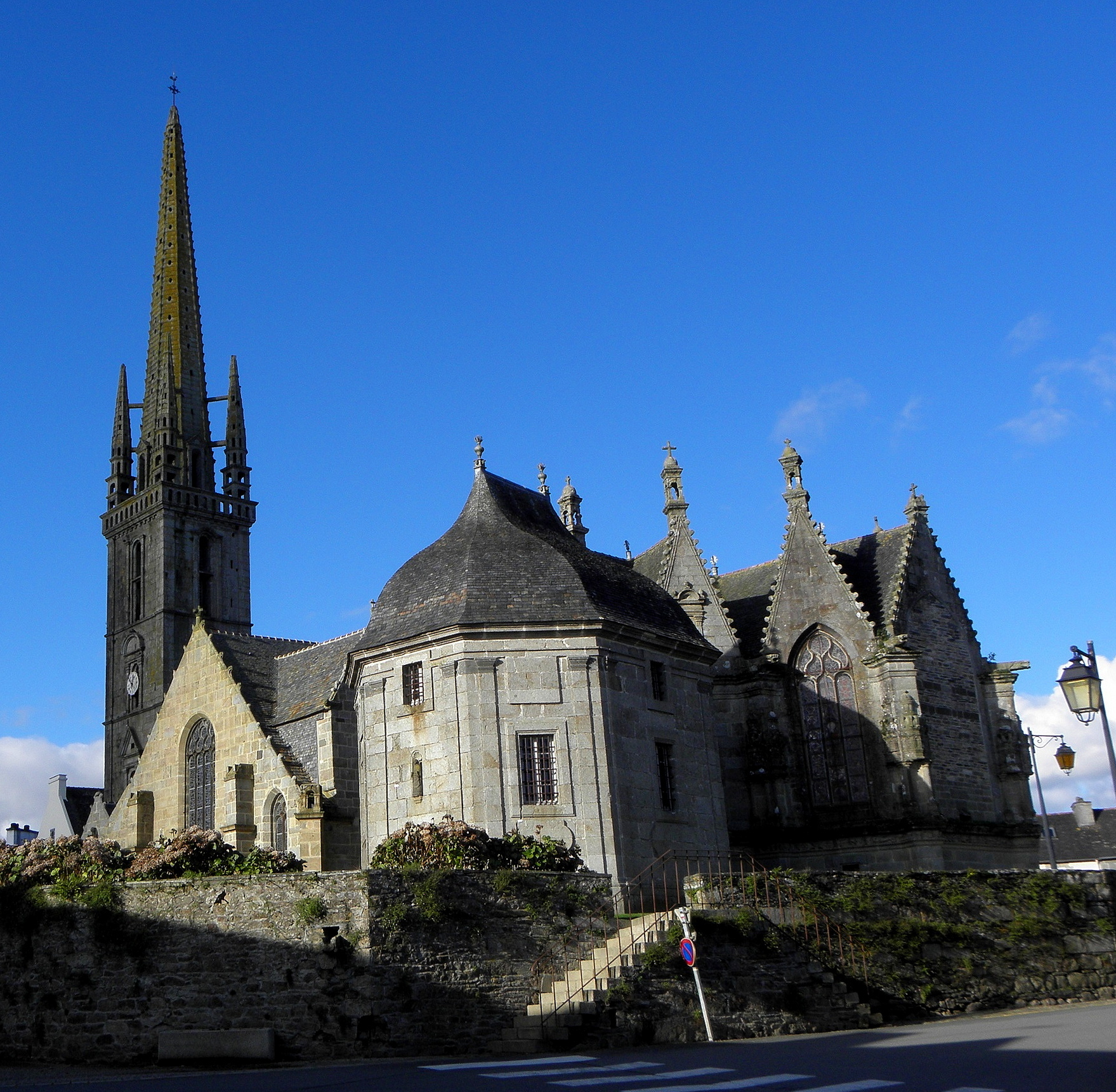
View of sacristy

The 17th century sacristy is located on the south side of the choir and is connected to the choir by a stone arch. The sacristy is octagonal in shape with a classical facade decorated with pilasters. The roofing slates are from the Monts d'Arré.

== Gallery ==
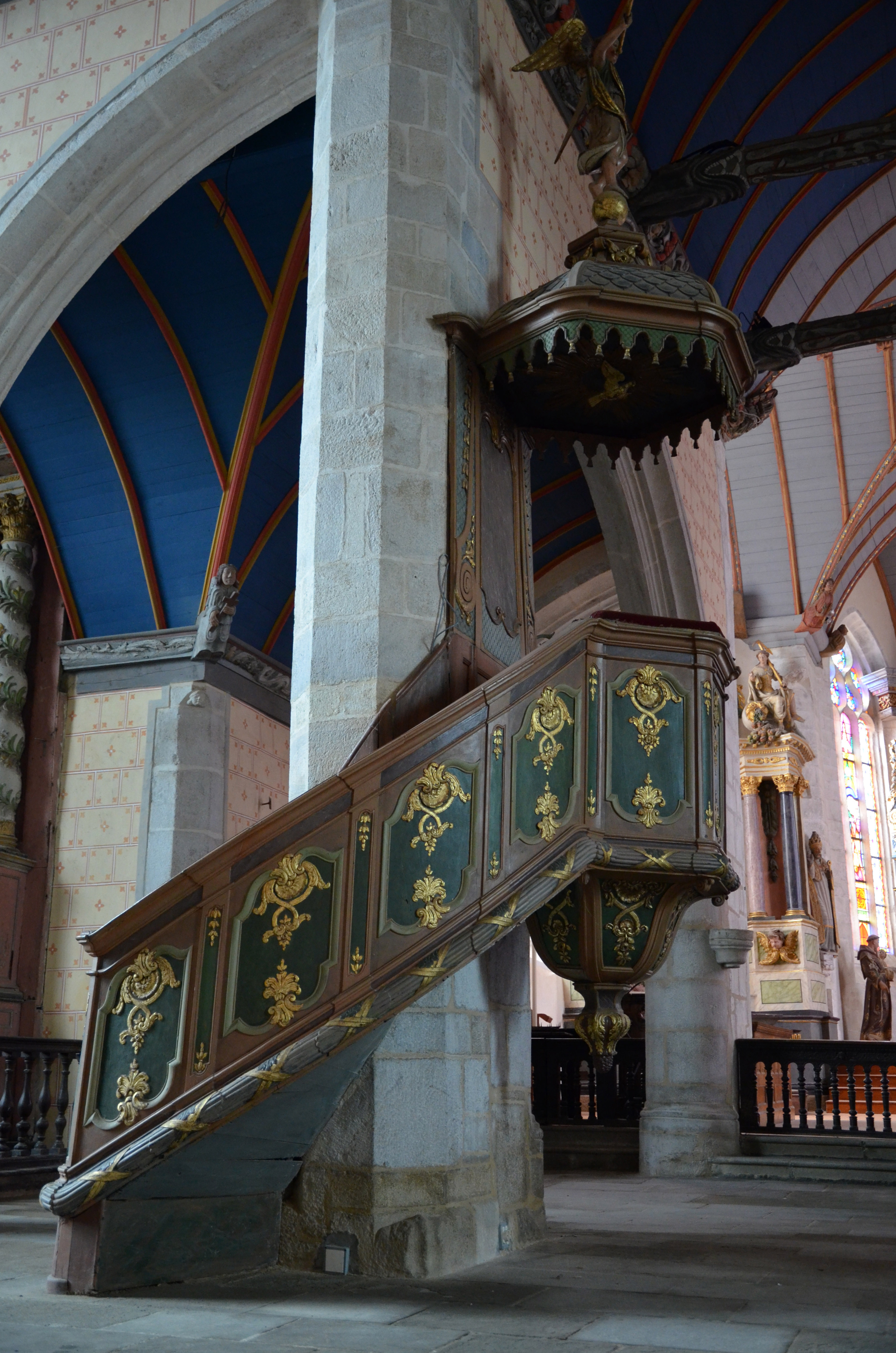
The pulpit in the church of St Suliau. This pulpit ("chaire à prêcher") dates to 1784 and is the work of Yves Cevaer.

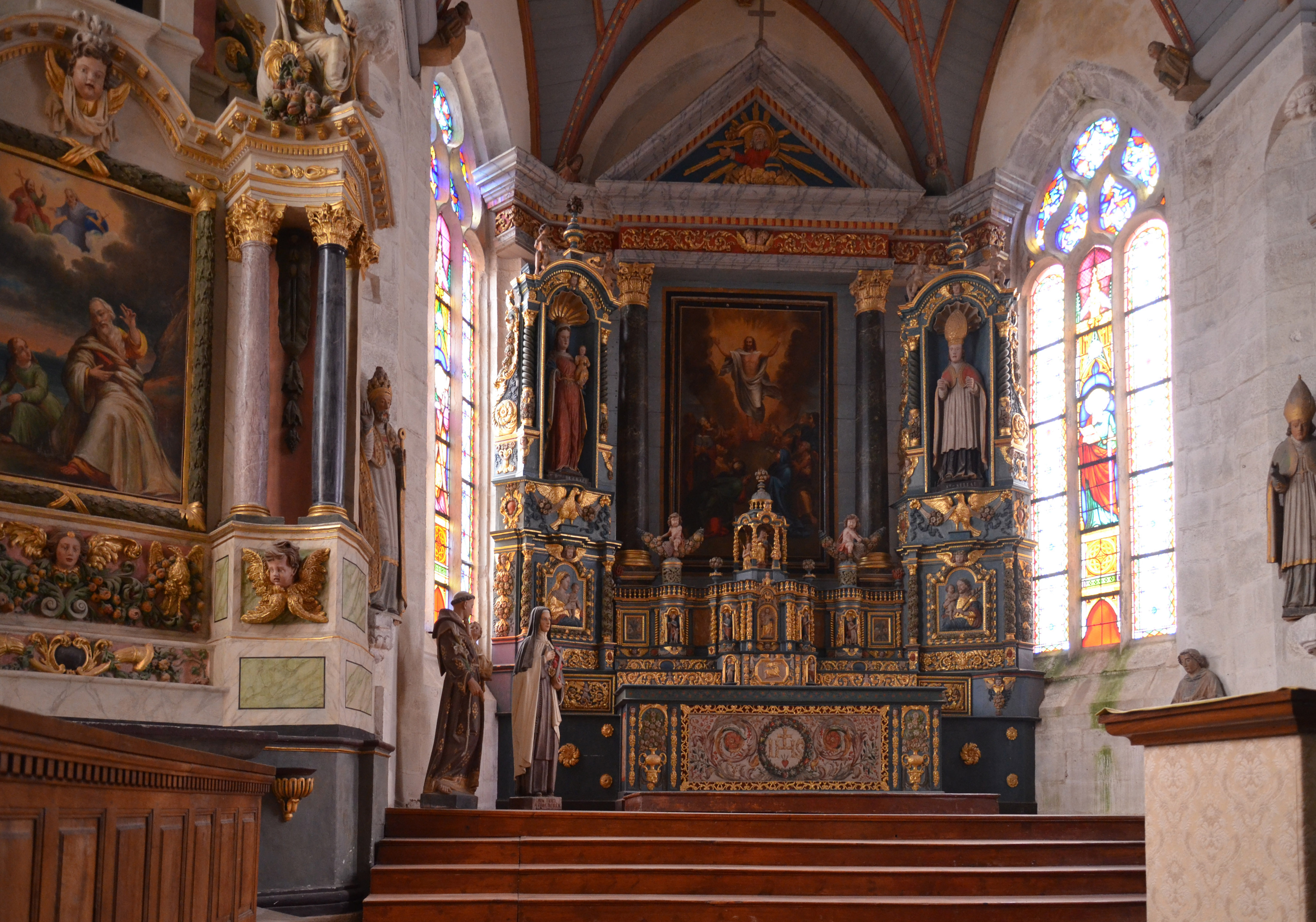
The main altar at Sizun.

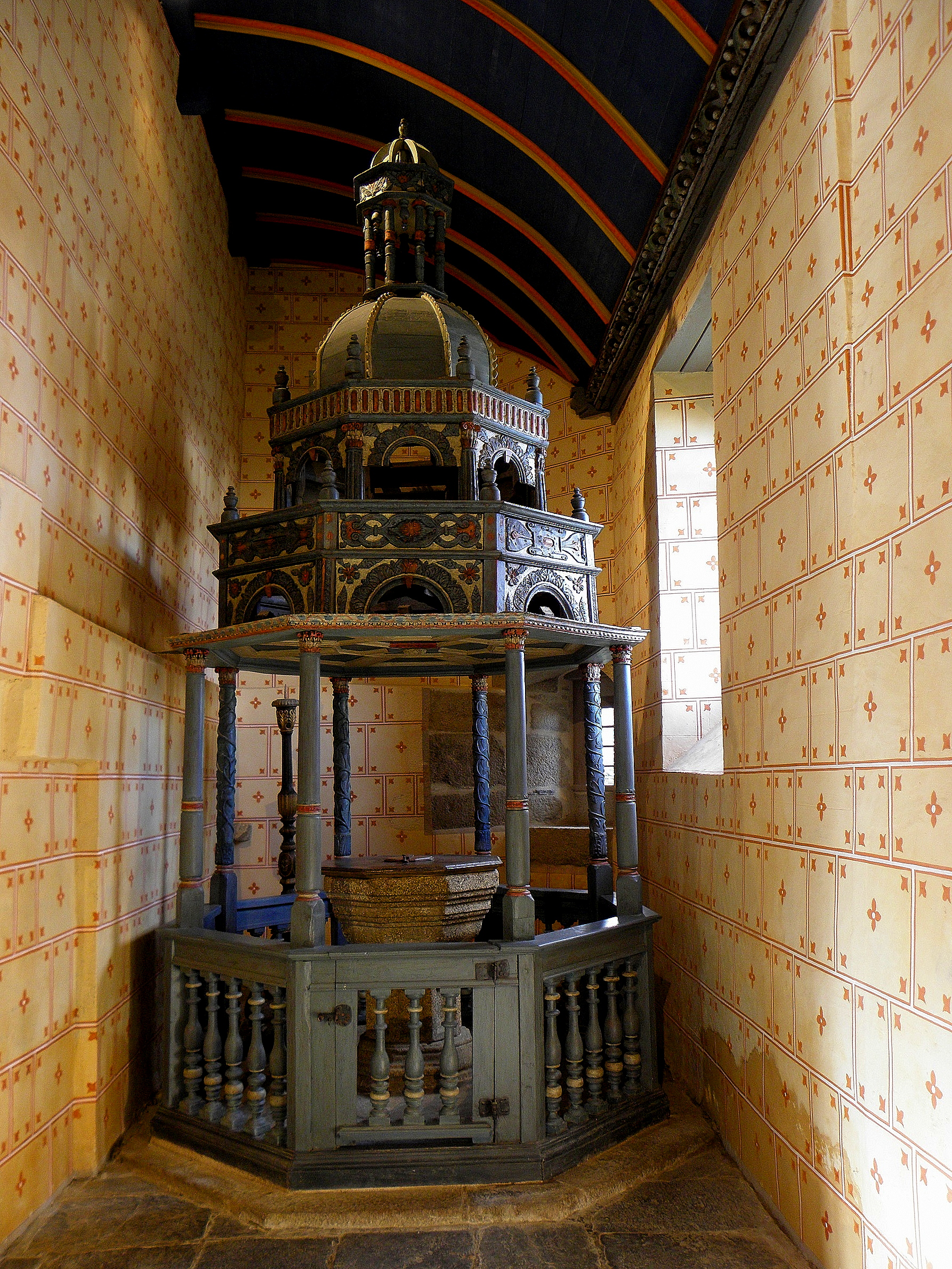
The baldachin over the baptismal font in the Eglise Saint-Suliau. The granite baptismal font is dated 1679. It is surmounted by a canopy or baldachin supported by eight columns, four plain and four ornamented.

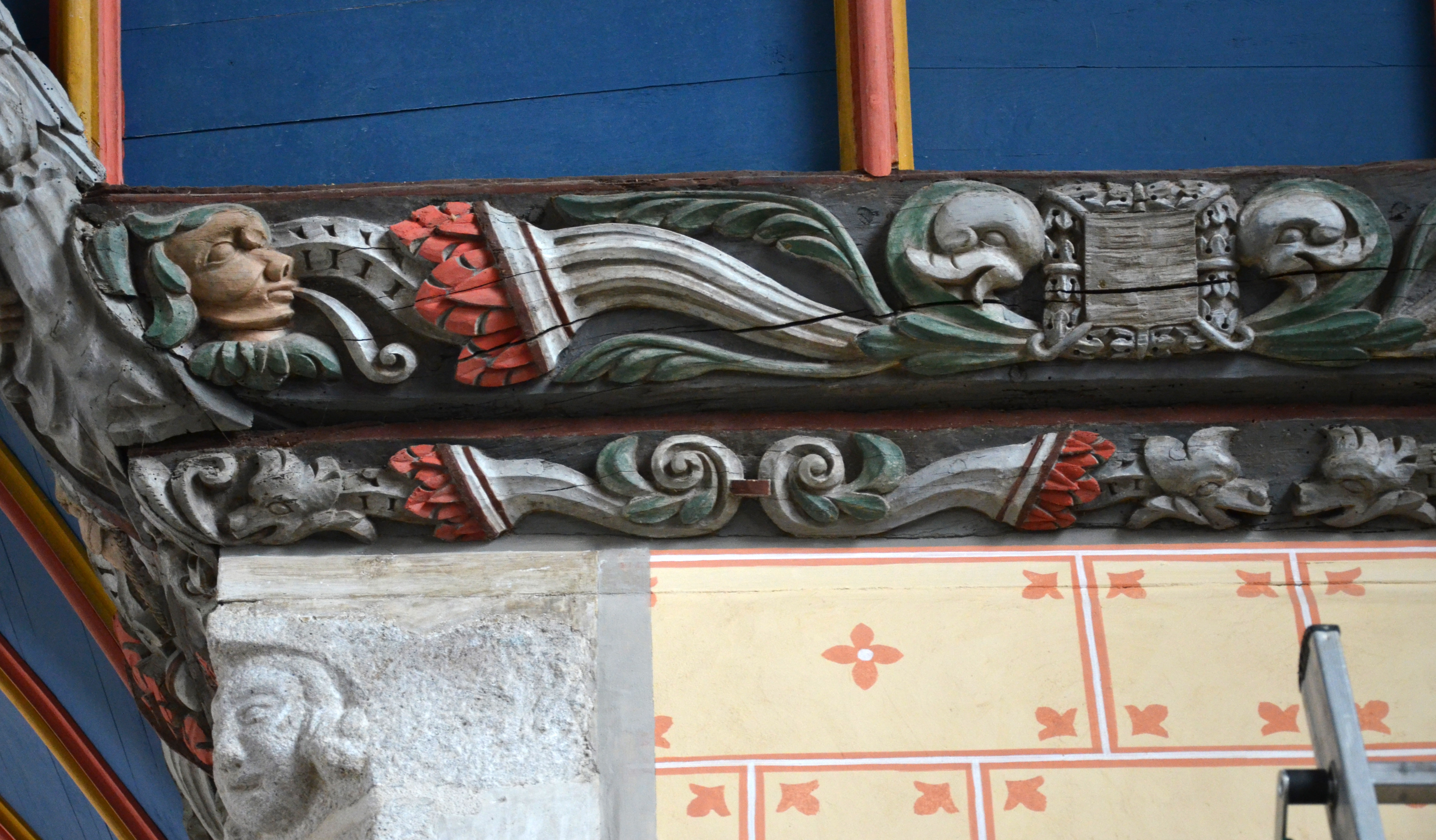
Sablière at Sizun. Sablières are the beams that sit below the ceiling and above the stone walls of churches.

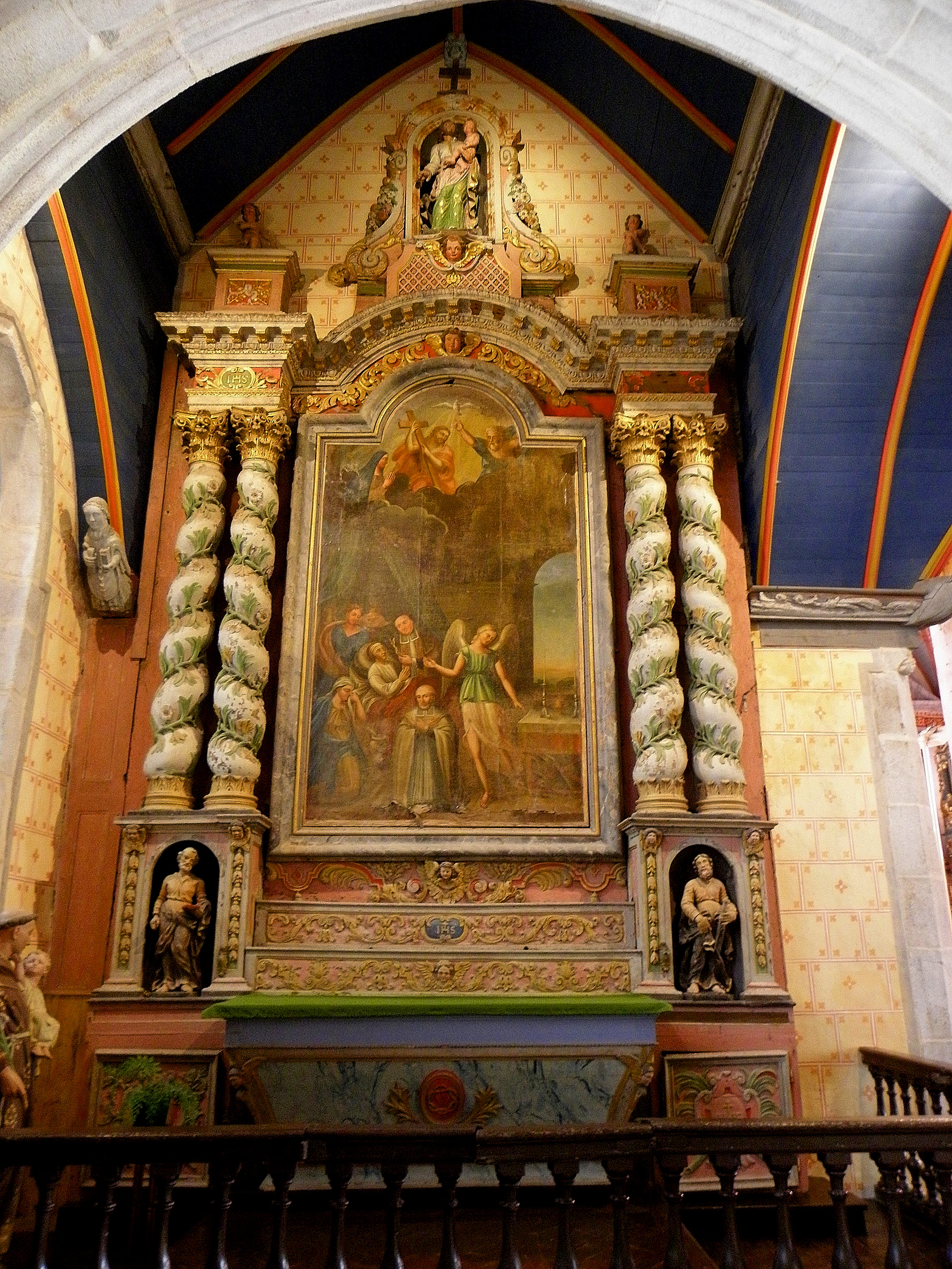
The Saint Joseph altarpiece

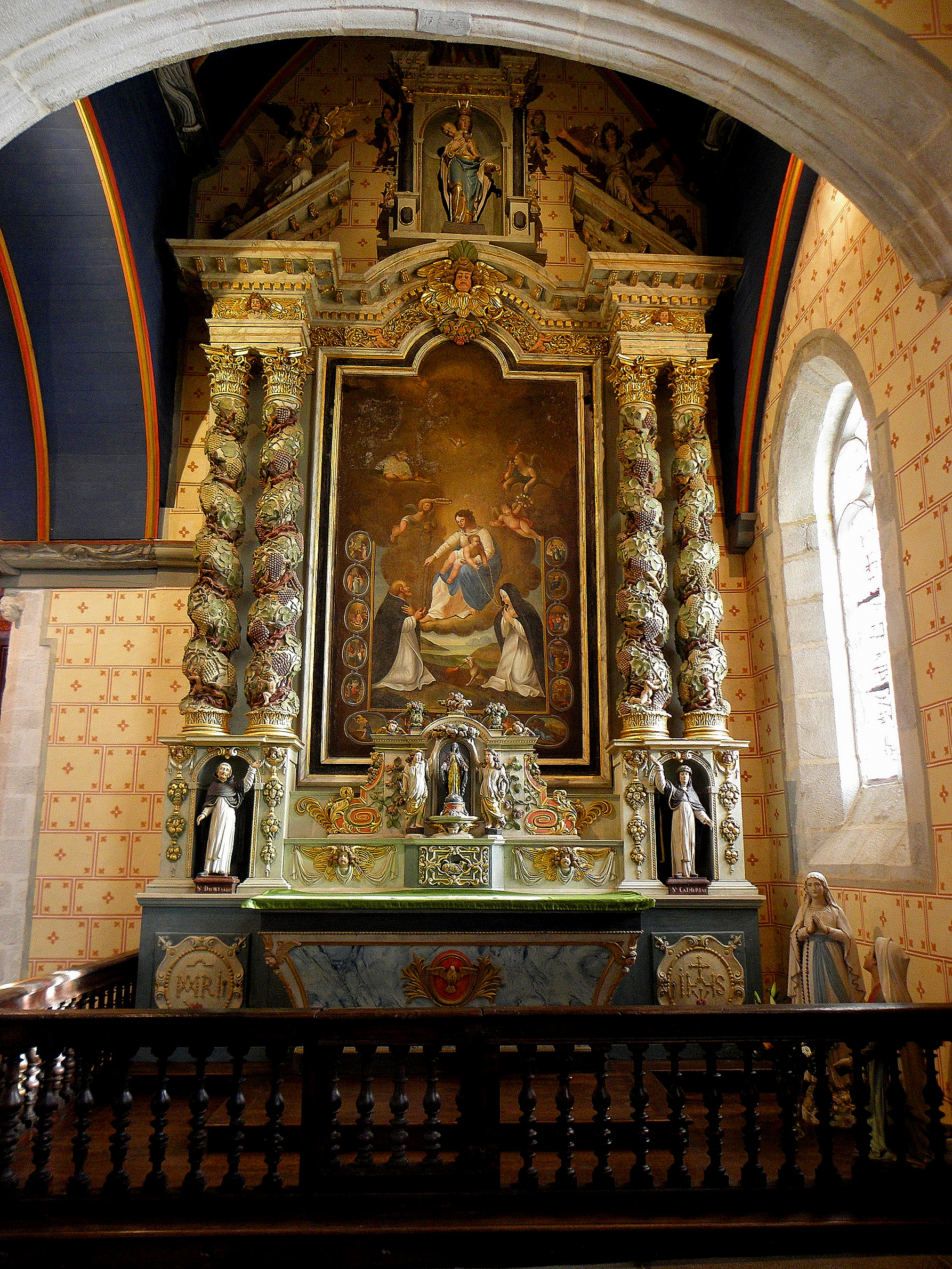
The "rosary" altarpiece. The altar of the Holy Rosary has two twisted columns that frame a painting of the death of a dedicated Christian in the presence of Dom Michel le Nobletz, a famous Breton missionary from the 17th century. The altar has statues of Saint Peter and Saint Paul on either side as well as a statue of Saint Joseph at the top.

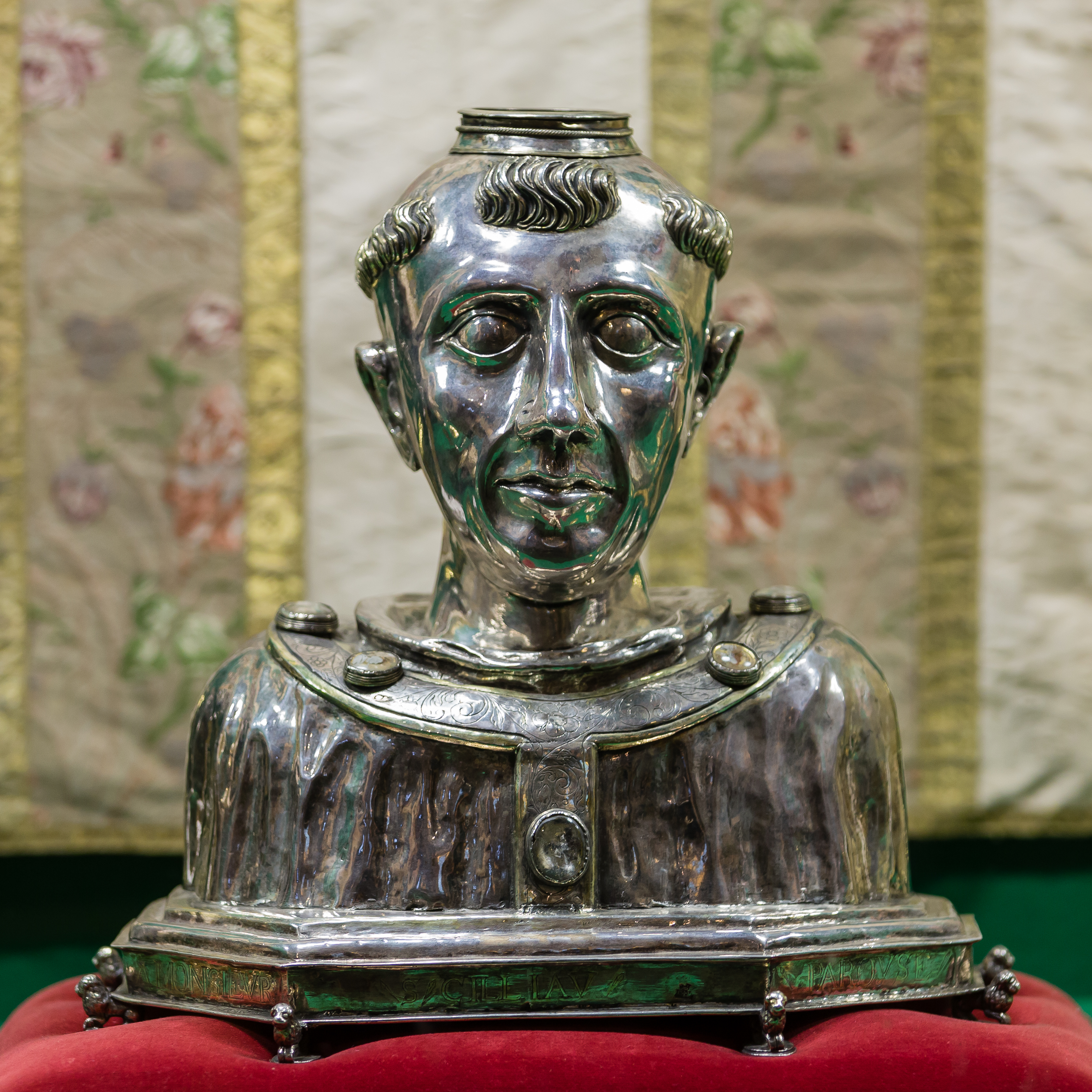
A relic; the head of Saint Suliau
