= Jeannette Laot =

French trade unionist and feminist (1925–2025)

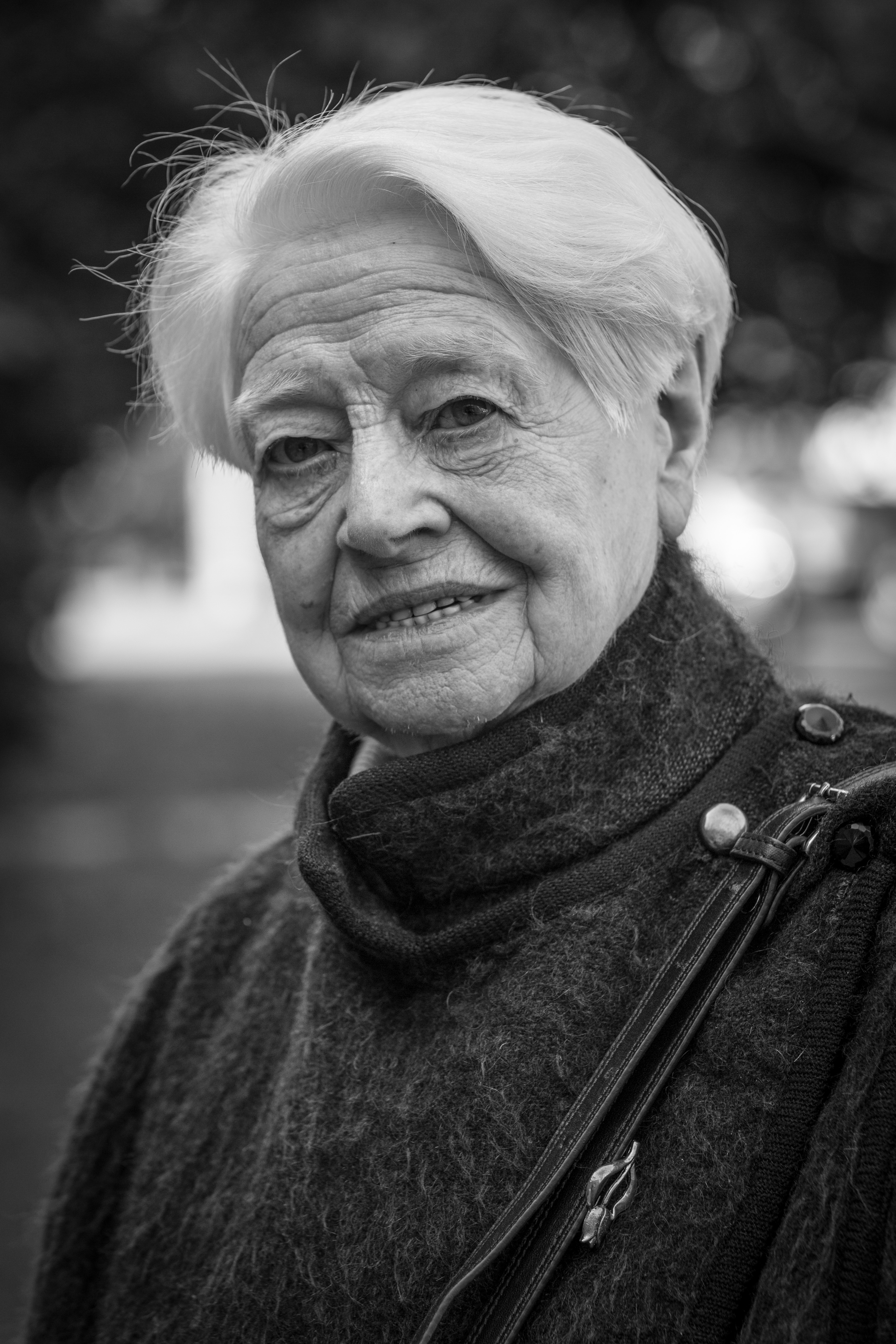
- Jeannette Laot in 2014
- Born: Jeanne Marie Laot; 15 January 1925; Landerneau, France
- Died: 14 May 2025 (aged 100); Strasbourg, France
- Occupation: Trade unionist • Feminist

Jeannette Laot (French: [ʒanɛt laɔt]; 15 January 1925 – 14 May 2025) was a French trade unionist and feminist.

== Life and career ==
Laot was born in Landerneau on 15 January 1925. She attended a Catholic school and obtained her school certificate in 1938. After initially joining Force Ouvrière (FO), but disappointed, she founded a trade union section of the French Confederation of Christian Workers (CFTC) in 1948 with the help of CFTC officials she had met at the Catholic Workers' Action.

In 1954, Laot moved to Paris and took on national responsibilities at the Federation of the Société d'exploitation industrielle des tabacs et des allumettes (SEITA). Active within the CFTC minority, it participated in the secularization of the union (the CFTC to the CFDT). In 1970, she joined the executive committee of the French Democratic Confederation of Labour (CFDT) in the wake of Edmond Maire. She was in charge of the living environment and then of industrial action while being responsible for the confederal women's commission. She also served as a special adviser to François Mitterrand.
