= Landerneau =

Landerneau Landerne (Breton)
- Commune
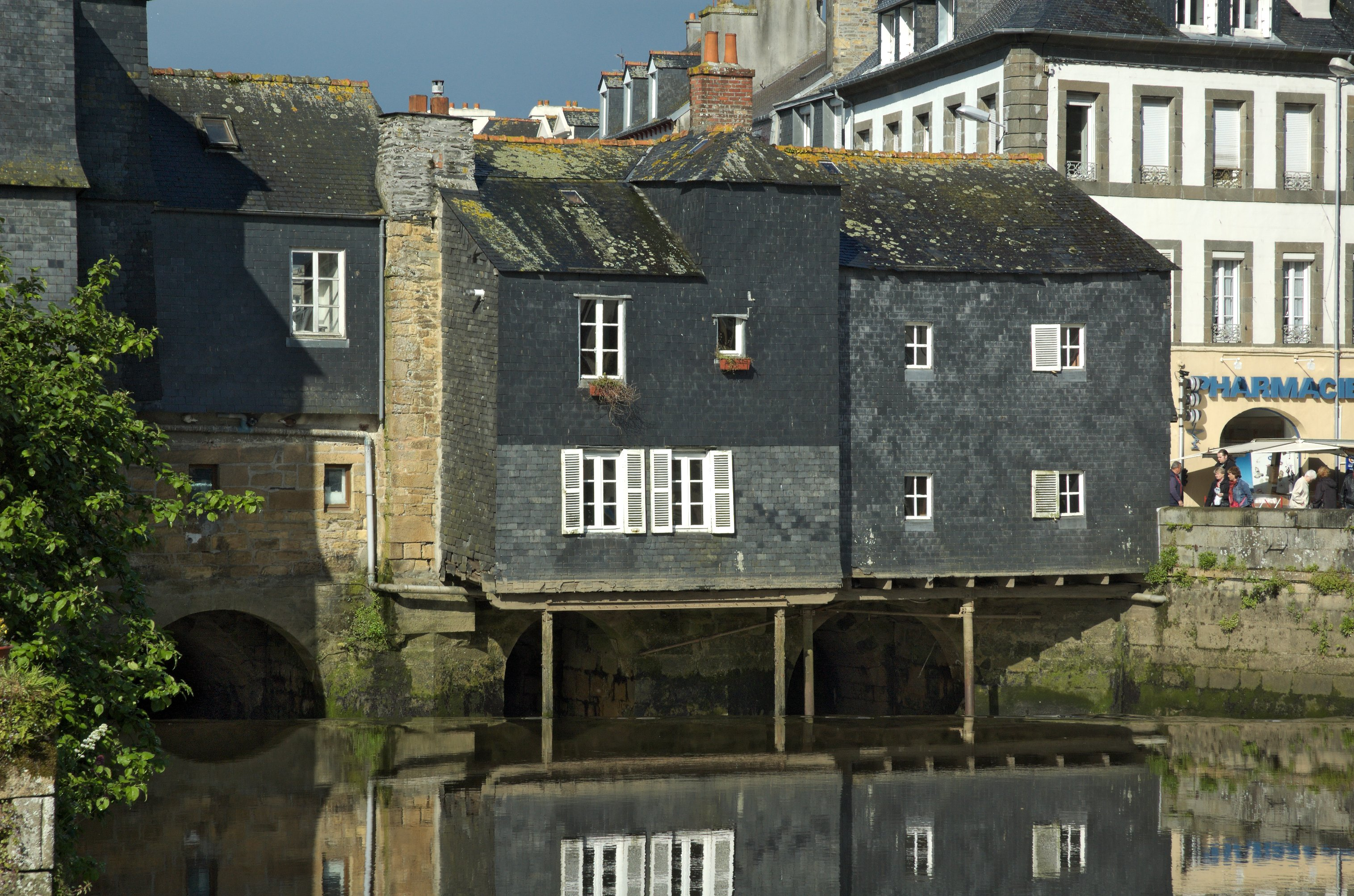
- Houses with a slate facade, on the Rohan Bridge

- Flag Coat of arms
- Location of Landerneau
- Location within France Location within Brittany
- Coordinates: 48°27′06″N 4°14′53″W
- Country: France
- Region: Brittany
- Department: Finistère
- Arrondissement: Brest
- Canton: Landerneau
- Intercommunality: CA Pays de Landerneau-Daoulas

Government
  - Mayor (2020–2026): Patrick Leclerc
- Area^{1}: 13.19 km^{2} (5.09 sq mi)
- Highest elevation: 175 m (574 ft)
- Lowest elevation: 1 m (3.3 ft)
- Population (2023): 16,363
  - Density: 1,241/km^{2} (3,213/sq mi)
- Time zone: UTC+01:00 (CET)
  - Summer (DST): UTC+02:00 (CEST)
- INSEE/Postal code: 29103 /29800
- ^{1} French Land Register data, which excludes lakes, ponds, glaciers > 1 km^{2} (0.386 sq mi or 247 acres) and river estuaries.

Landerneau (French pronunciation: [lɑ̃dɛʁno]; Breton: Landerne, pronounced [lãnˈdɛrne]) is a commune in the Finistère department of Brittany in north-western France.

It lies at the mouth of the Elorn River which divides the Breton provinces of Cornouaille and Léon, 22 km (14 mi) east of Brest. The name is from Lan Terneo and can mean "(religious) enclosure of St Ténénan (Welsh: Tyrnog)": allegedly a Welshman who also had llans in the Vale of Clwyd in North Wales and in Somerset, and who moved to Brittany in the 7th century. Lann means a religious sacred place. The town has been founded by Saint Arnoc, some times called Ternoc and confusion can occur with Saint Ténénan. Some sources point Saint Arnoc and Saint Ténénan as the same person. It was an important centre of the flax and linen industries in the 16th and 17th centuries. Landerneau is also the hometown of Édouard Leclerc, a businessman and entrepreneur who founded the French supermarket chain E.Leclerc in 1948. The town is actually the heart of the agricultural market in northwest Brittany with several agribusiness companies headquarters located in the town.

The town is also known for its moon, La Lune de Landerneau (the Moon of Landerneau). This nickname is supposed from a noble visiting Versailles court and was not impressed by the luxury of the Château de Versailles. He was contemplating the moon with others in the Versailles gardens when he said "the Landerneau's moon is bigger", that made the assembly laugh. The Breton noble made reference to a big silver metal disc on top of the Saint Houardon Church, well known in the surroundings as "the moon of Landerneau".

It was at Landernau that the painter Eugène Boudin painted "Landernau, Mouillage à l'Embouchure de la Rivière" circa 1870-3.

== Pont de Rohan ==
A picturesque feature of the town centre is the sixteenth-century house-lined bridge (the Pont de Rohan) across the Elorn. The Pont de Rohan was the most downstream crossing of the Elorn River until 1930 and the construction of the Pont Albert Louppe near Brest.

== International relations ==
Landerneau is twinned with the towns of Caernarfon in Gwynedd in Wales and Hünfeld in Germany.

== Music festival ==
Each year in August a music festival called "Fête du bruit dans Landerneau" takes place in Landerneau. "Fête du bruit dans Landerneau" means "festival of noise in Landerneau". When spoken it sounds identical to "faites du bruit dans Landerneau" which means "make some noise in Landerneau". This is a play on words based on the homophones "fête" and "faites". It also a play on words based on a French expression "Cela va faire du bruit dans Landerneau" meaning "That gonna make some noise in Landerneau". The origins of the expression is not clear. The first theory is from a 1796 theater drama, "Alexandre Duval's Les Héritiers", after a famous sailor declared dead is back to his hometown, Landerneau. "His death will make some noise in Landerneau" text said. The second theory is from the "Bagne de Brest" (Brest's Prison between 1749 and 1848). When a prisoner escapes, the prison's cannons were fired to alarm the area of the evasion. The noise of the canons could be heard from Landeneau, 22 kilometers (14 miles) away.

== Population ==
Inhabitants of Landerneau are called in French Landernéens. It the 4th most populous commune of Finistère Departement.

Historical population

Year	Pop.	±% p.a.
1793	4,012	—
1800	3,669	−1.27%
1806	3,896	+1.01%
1821	4,317	+0.69%
1831	4,933	+1.34%
1836	4,963	+0.12%
1841	4,906	−0.23%
1846	4,934	+0.11%
1851	5,113	+0.72%
1856	6,518	+4.98%
1861	6,959	+1.32%
1866	7,853	+2.45%
1872	7,717	−0.29%
1876	8,195	+1.51%
1881	9,078	+2.07%
1886	8,927	−0.33%
1891	8,497	−0.98%
1896	8,038	−1.10%
1901	7,080	−2.51%

Year	Pop.	±% p.a.
1906	7,737	+1.79%
1911	8,252	+1.30%
1921	7,735	−0.64%
1926	7,424	−0.82%
1931	8,004	+1.52%
1936	8,855	+2.04%
1946	10,975	+2.17%
1954	10,950	−0.03%
1962	11,834	+0.98%
1968	12,781	+1.29%
1975	14,541	+1.86%
1982	14,482	−0.06%
1990	14,269	−0.19%
1999	14,281	+0.01%
2007	14,902	+0.53%
2012	15,265	+0.48%
2017	15,781	+0.67%
2023	16,363	+0.61%

Source: EHESS and INSEE (1968-2023)

== Breton language ==
Landerneau has many bilingual signs (French and Breton), and is the first town where the indications in the local station were made bilingual, as a result of the Ya d'ar brezhoneg charter of the Ofis ar Brezhoneg.

The municipality launched a linguistic plan through Ya d'ar brezhoneg on 12 December 2004. In 2008, 12.46% of primary-school children attended bilingual schools.

== Schools ==
There are eight (private and public) preschools and primary schools in the town, including a Diwan school, and two high schools.

== Transport ==
- The town has its own bus transportation system named "Ar Bus" (The bus) and includes 6 lines. Buses are free of charge on Saturdays.
- Landerneau station is a stop on the Paris–Brest railway and the branch to Quimper. Near the Train Station, all local bus lines and departement bus lines connect at the "Gare Routière" (central bus station).
- The Town was the first in France to build a Square shaped roundabout in front of its Train Station, on Matthieu Donnart Place.
- The town is connected to RN 12; a trunk road connecting Landerneau to Brest and Paris via Departmental Road (D)770 that also links to the town of Daoulas at south, where the trunk road to Quimper is. The D770 can be a bypass from/to Quimper to the north coast (N165 <> N12) avoiding Brest surroundings.

== Notable people ==
- Jeannette Laot (1925–2025), trade unionist and feminist.

== See also ==
- Communes of the Finistère department
- Landerneau Parish close
- List of the works of Bastien and Henry Prigent
- List of the works of the Maître de Plougastel
- St Thomas' Church
