= Plougastel Bridge =

Plougastel Bridge Pont Albert-Louppe
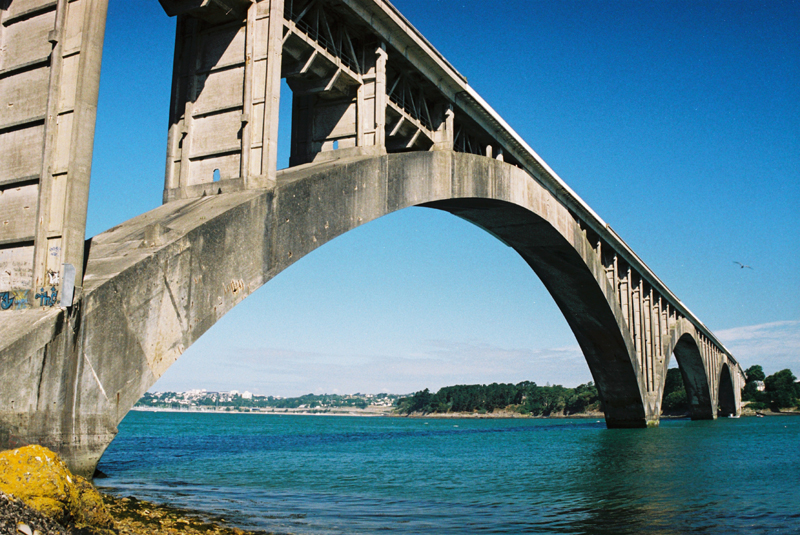
- Coordinates: 48°23′14″N 4°23′59″W
- Crosses: L'Élorn

Characteristics
- Design: Arch bridge fixed at two levels
- Material: Reinforced concrete
- Total length: 888m
- Width: 9m
- Height: 27.5m

History
- Architect: Eugène Freyssinet
- Constructed by: Direction départementale de l'Équipement du Finistère
- Fabrication by: Entreprises Limousin
- Construction start: 1926
- Construction end: 1930
- Inaugurated: 1930

Location
- Interactive map of Plougastel Bridge

The Plougastel Bridge, or Albert-Louppe Bridge, is a bridge over the river Élorn near Brest, France, connecting Plougastel-Daoulas and Le Relecq-Kerhuon.

Construction on the Plougastel Bridge started in 1926 and was completed on 9 October 1930. Part of it was destroyed by the German army in 1944, and shortly after was closed for repair. It was reopened after the widening and construction five years later. Between 1991 and 1994 another bridge, the Pont de l'Iroise, was built parallel to this bridge. Today the Plougastel carries tractor, pedestrian and bicycle traffic and is a landmark on the route of the Paris–Brest–Paris bicycle event.

The Plougastel Bridge is an arch bridge, or has a fixed, double deck structure. The arches are composed of concrete and have a total length of around 888m. The three major spans are 188 m but sometimes said to be 186 m.

The engineer who constructed the bridge was named Eugène Freyssinet, and the president of the committee managing the project was Albert Louppe, an explosives engineer who pursued a parallel career in politics, becoming the Senator for Finistère in 1921. Louppe died in 1927, one year after work on constructing the bridge finally began.
