= St Thomas' Church, Landerneau =

Coordinates: 48.4490°N 4.2490°W

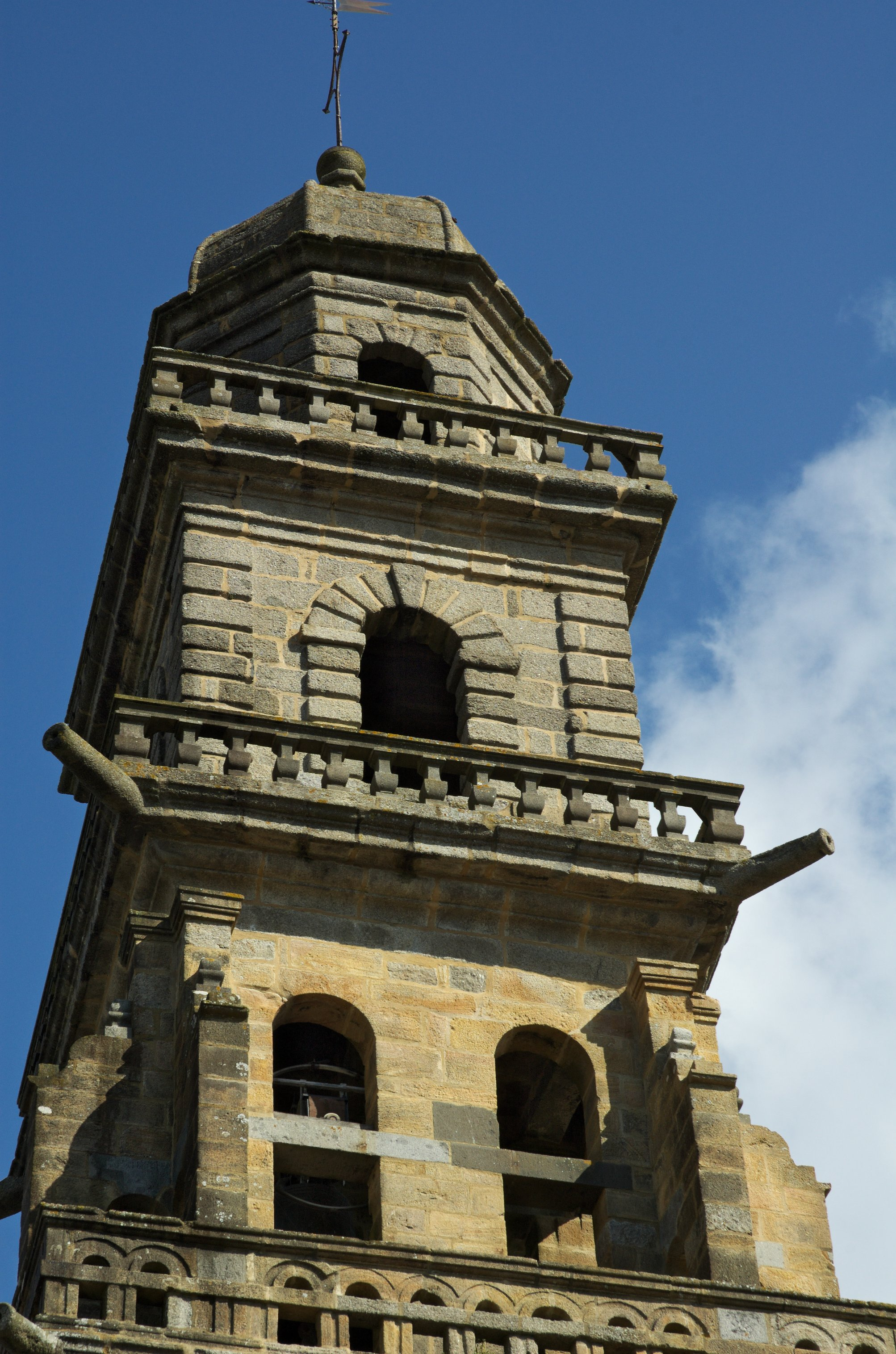
The bell tower at Saint-Thomas-de-Cantorbéry

St Thomas' Church (French: Église Saint-Thomas-de-Cantorbéry) is located at Landerneau in the arrondissement of Brest in Brittany in north-western France. The church, dedicated to Saint Thomas of Canterbury, was built between 1607 and 1669. The church is a listed historical monument since 1932.

== History ==
The clock tower was built in 1607 and on the small bell-tower attached to the sacristy, the date 1669 is inscribed. The church was listed on the 11 May 1932. Only the church and ossuary remain of the original parish enclosure. The original sanctuary or priory dates back to around 1200 when it was established by Hervé 1st of Léon and dedicated to Saint Thomas Becket, who had been assassinated by Henry II of England. Historians suggest that the choice of Becket as the patron saint was a demonstration of Hervé 1st's determination to avoid English domination and to remove the stigma left by his father's defeat and death at the hands of the English in 1167. When Brittany began to prosper in the 16th and 17th centuries, the existing church was replaced by something more substantial and the resultant church included a bell tower with porch, a nave with five transepts and two aisles and a flat chevet in the Flamboyant Gothic style, so typical of the region's churches in the 16th century. The Église Saint-Houardon is also an important church in Landerneau.

== The porch ==
The arched porch has a leaf-shaped keystone and has three niches topped with the carving of a crescent moon, a design attributed to Philibert Delorme and common to the area. The porch interior has 12 niches to accommodate statues of the apostles but these niches are empty. There is however a stoup carved from Kersanton stone, this having a fluted bowl.

== The sablières ==
These have both Renaissance type motifs with masks, putti and vases and some more bizarre and humorous carvings such as a sow drinking from a barrel whilst a woman has taken a knife and attempts to carve a piece from the sow's bottom.

== The altar ==
This takes the shape of a tomb. The altar was built in 1711 and is surmounted by a five-lancet window, and on one side of the altar there is a statue of Saint Thomas of Canterbury and on the other Saint Blaise. Under each statue there is a bas-relief depicting their martyrdoms. Above the steps of the altar are two reliefs. One depicts the Last Supper and the second Jesus washing the disciples' feet.

== Statues ==
The church has many fine statues in the nave and choir areas. There is a sculpture in wood of the Virgin Mary dating from 1430 to 1450 and a statue in Kersanton stone dating from the 16th century.

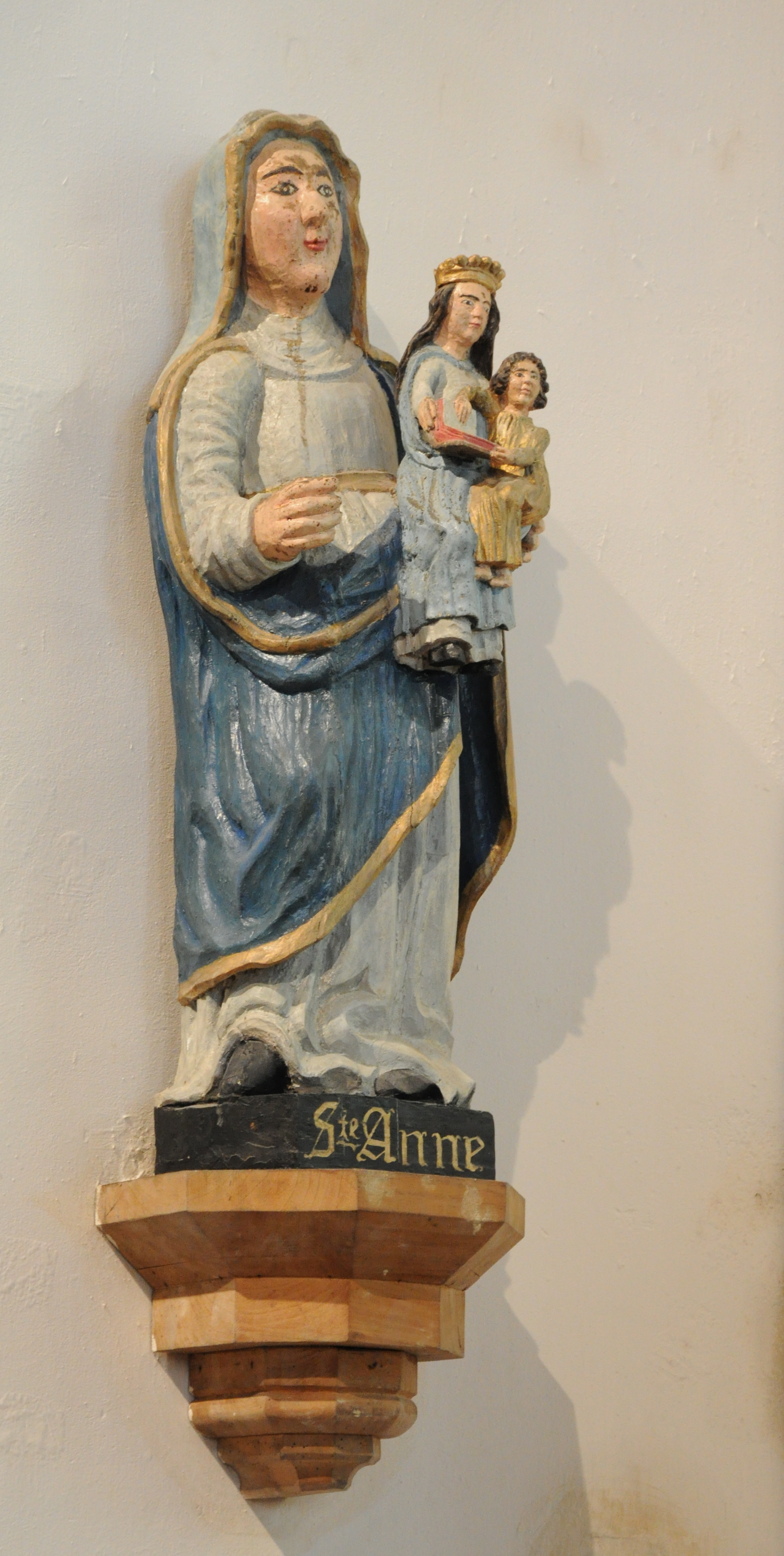
Statue of Saint Anne. She holds the Virgin Mary and baby Jesus

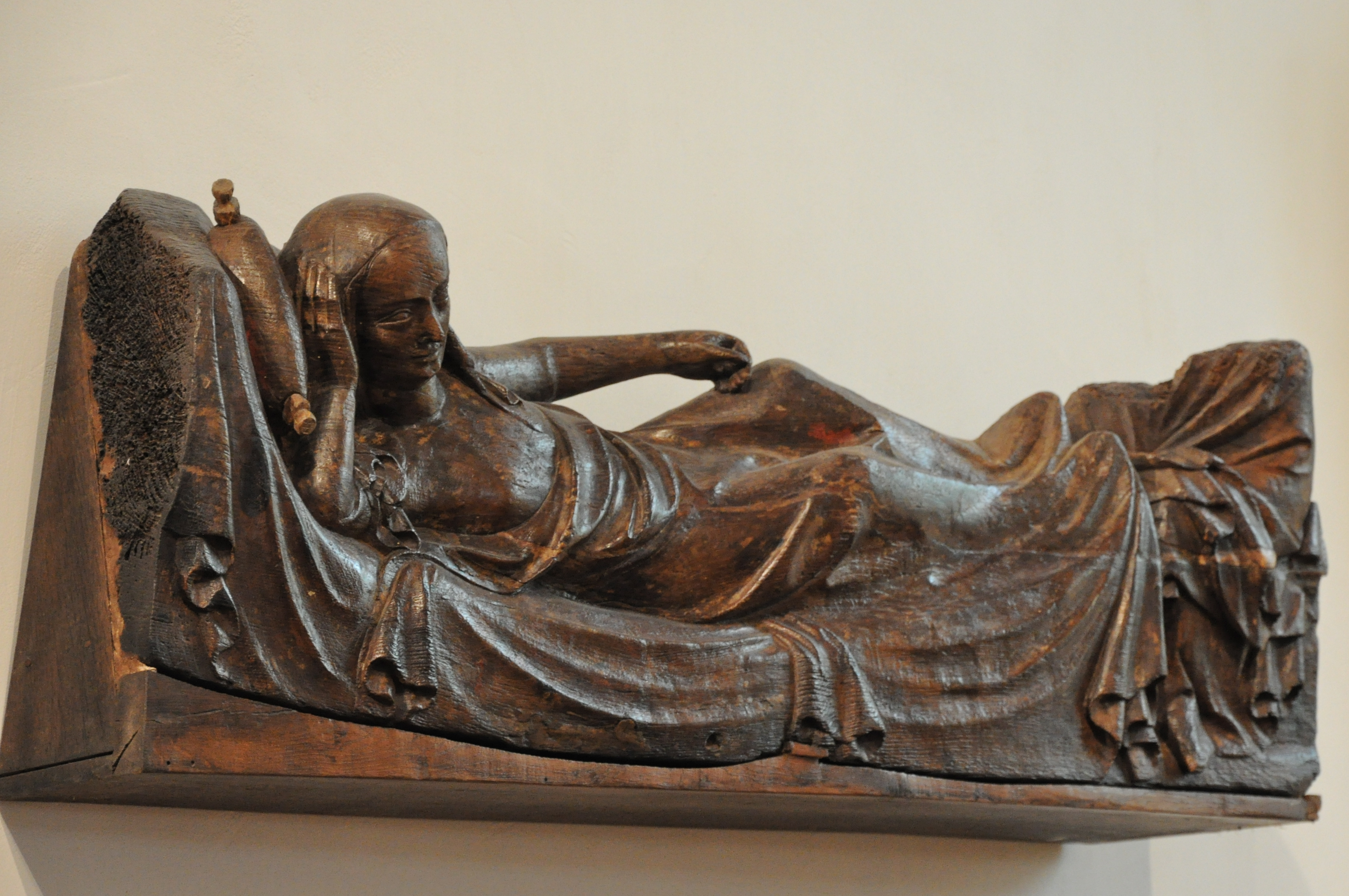
Wood carving depicting the Virgin Mary

== The ossuary ==
The ossuary dates to 1635 and stands on the west side of the church. It is dedicated to Saint Cadou, a 16th-century monk. The building's façade has four windows separated by ionic pilasters.

== Gallery of images ==
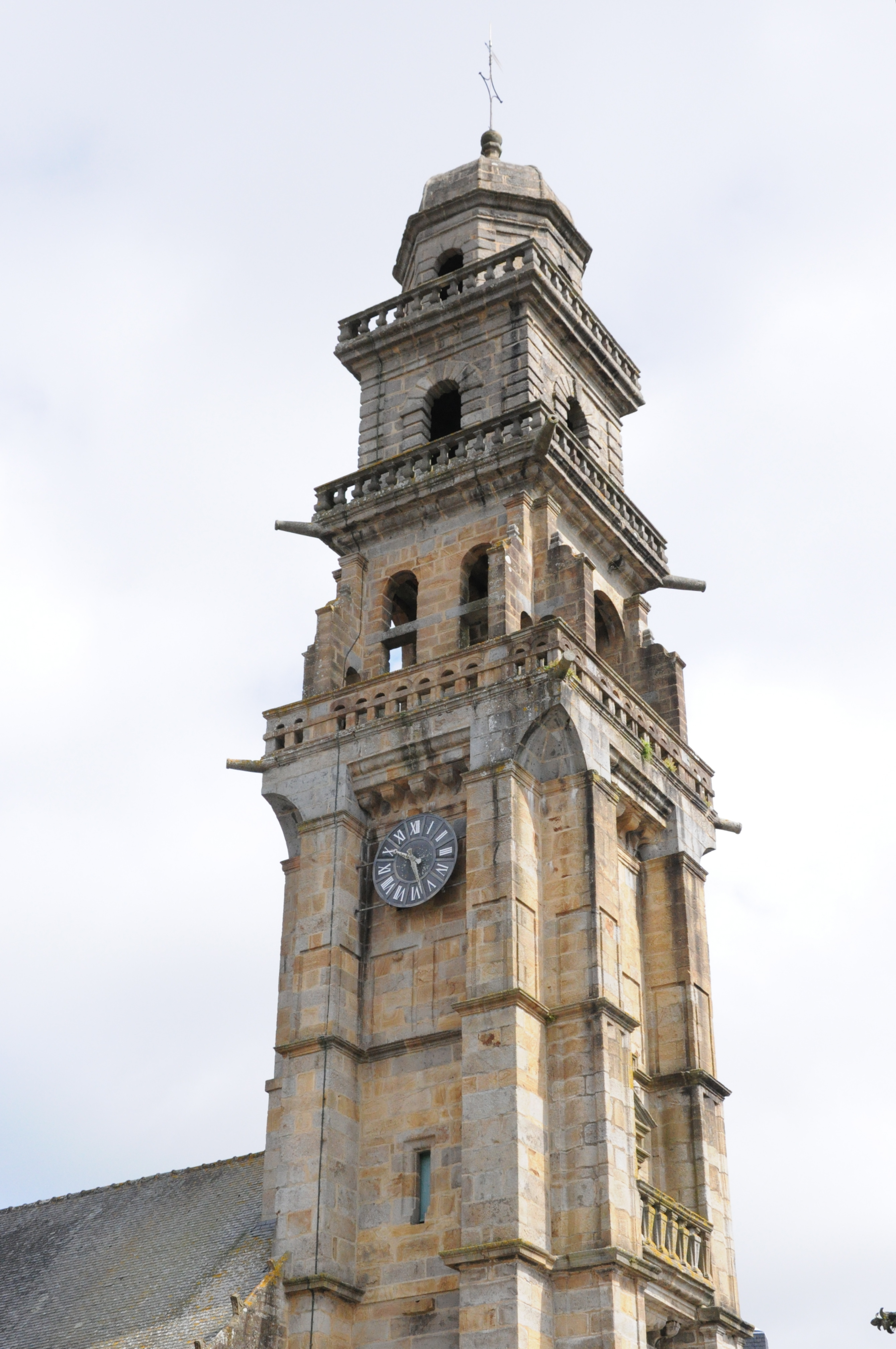
Another view of the bell tower

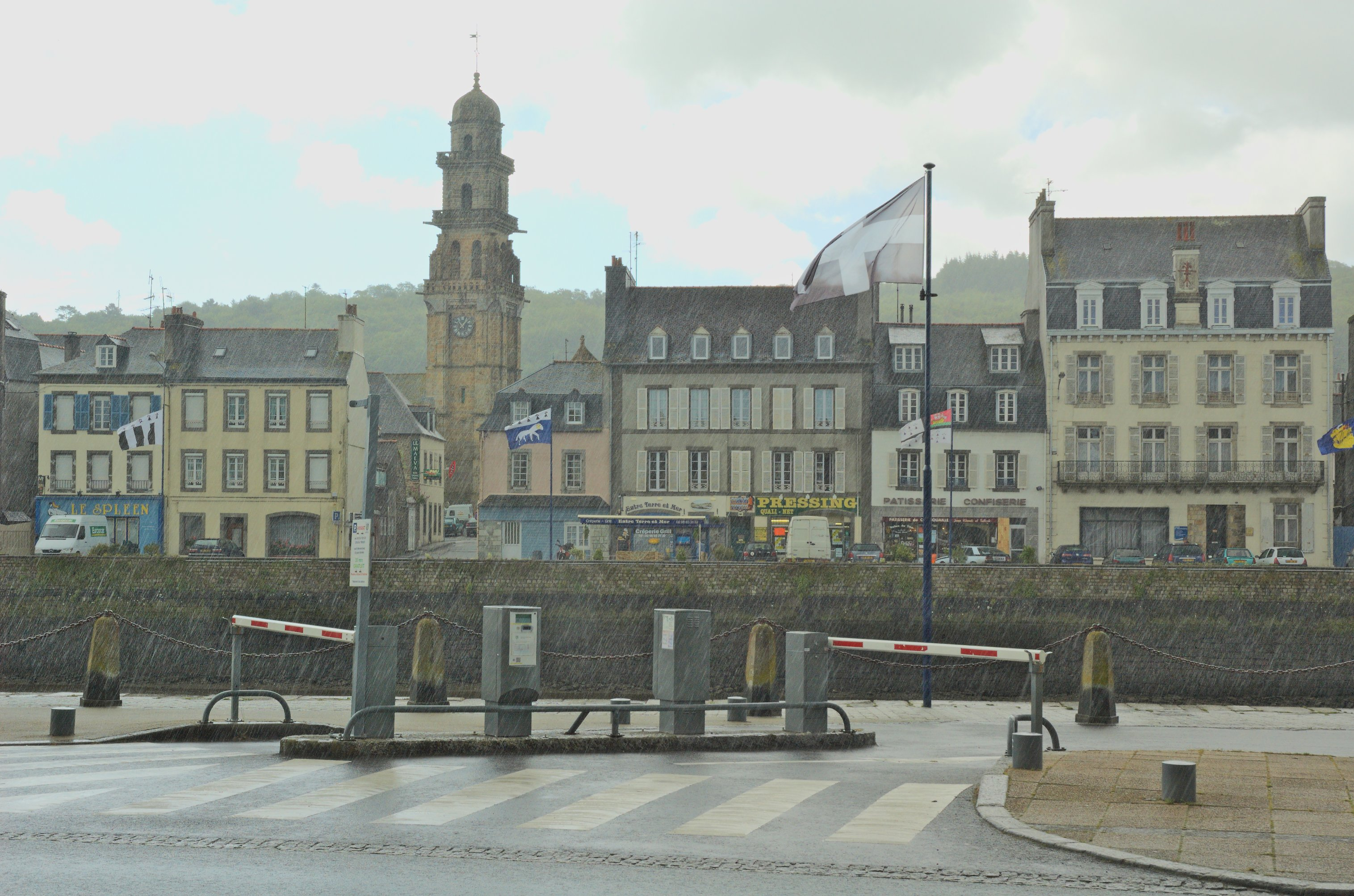
View of church from the Quai Leon

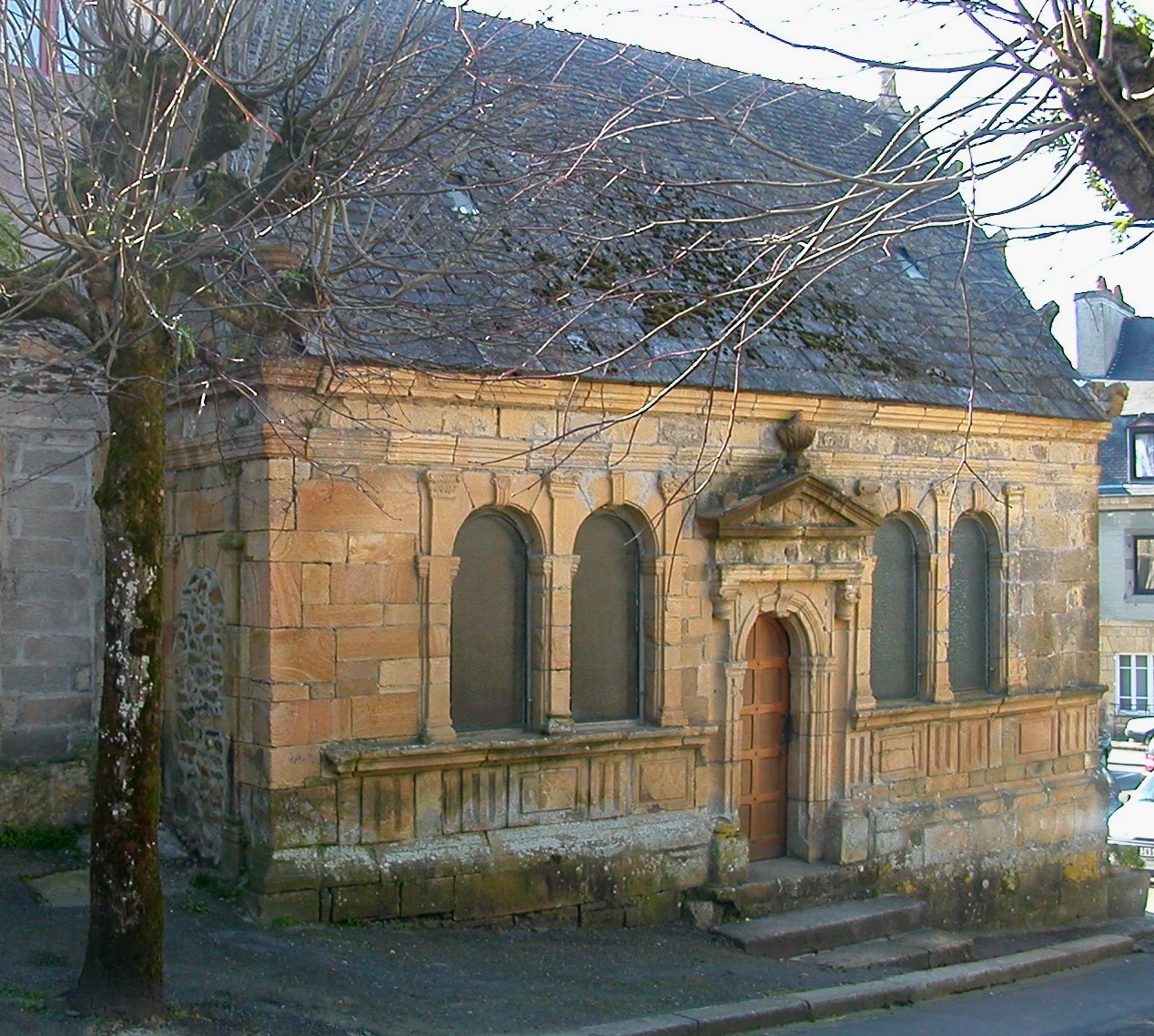
The ossuary

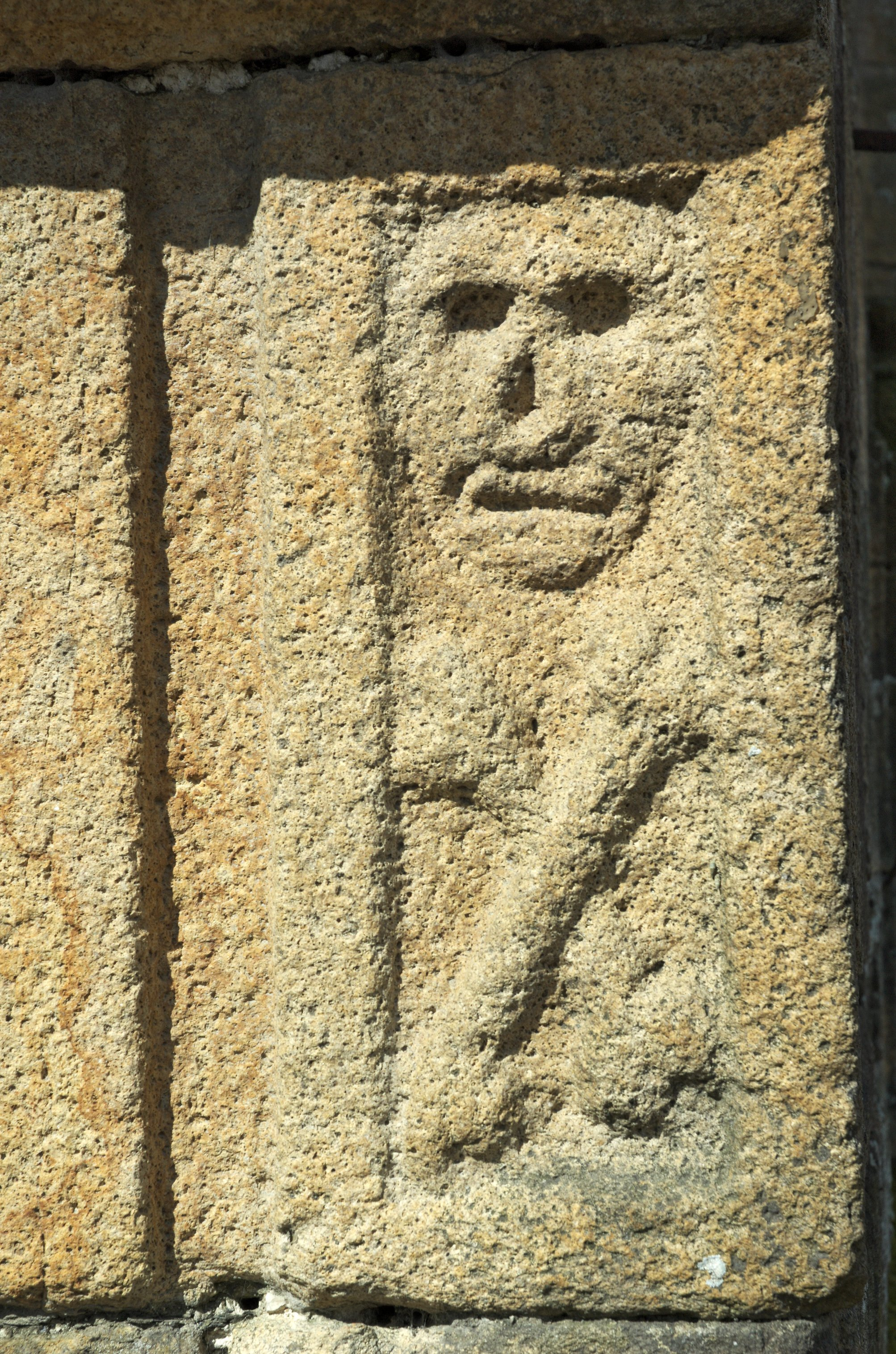
An ankou on the ossuary wall.
