= Iroise Sea =

Part of the Atlantic Ocean

Map of the Iroise Sea

Iroise (/ɪˈrwɑːz/) or the Iroise Sea (French: mer d'Iroise [iʁwɑz]; Breton: An Hirwazh) is the part of the Atlantic Ocean which stretches from the Ile de Sein to Ushant off the coast of Brittany in north-western France. It is contained within the Celtic Sea, bordering the remainder of the Celtic Sea to the north and west, and the Bay of Biscay to the south. It is one of the most dangerous seas in Europe for sea-going vessels. In winter, there are often violent storms with huge waves. It is also one of the richest areas for marine life and was designated as one of UNESCO's biosphere reserves in 1988 and as France's first marine park in October 2007.

== Name and extent ==
The name is first recorded in the Neptune francois of 1693 as Le Passage de l'Yroise (passage = "channel"); as Passage de l'Iroise in the 18th century; as Iroise in the 19th century; and as mer d'Iroise (mer = "sea") in the 1970s, by the seabed exploration industry. The name appears to have been fixed not by local seafarers but rather by staff at the naval base at Brest. The 18th-century maps identify "Passage de l'Iroise" as the channel leading north-west from Pointe Saint-Mathieu and keeping south of Ushant (Ouessant) and the Ponant Islands. From the 19th century, the term Iroise encompassed all the sea along the west coast of Brittany between Ouessant and Sein. While this remains the limit used by mariners, some twentieth-century sources have used mer d'Iroise to denote the entire Celtic Sea as far as Ireland and Great Britain.

The meaning of Iroise is obscure; theories include:

- from the Old French Iroise meaning "Irish", denoting the sea route from France to Ireland
- from a dubious Old French adjective iroise, meaning "angry", referring to the rough seas (sometimes Angry Sea is found as an English language translation)
- from Breton hirgwaz; hir "long" + gwaz "stream, channel"
- From the Breton ervoas, or "deep", referring to the Atlantic Ocean, in contrast to the shallow English Channel

From the 1990s, "Iroise" became popular in Finistère in the name of many local businesses and associations. The Pont de l'Iroise bridge was opened in 1994.

in maritime weather forecasts by Météo-France and Spain's AEMET, "Iroise" denotes the sea area east of a line from 48°27′N 6°0′W to 47°30′N 6°0′W; this corresponds to the northern part of the UK shipping forecast sea area of Biscay.

== Location and environment ==
The Iroise coastline consists of a rich variety of beaches, rocky cliffs, sand dunes, coves and islands such as the Île de Sein and the Island of Molene.

The considerable differences in depth and the adjacent English Channel create the strong currents through the Iroise. High tides in the Channel bring about strong north-easterly currents, which reverse at low tide. The currents can reach particularly high speeds at the Raz de Sein or the Goulet de Brest.

Many lighthouses were erected in the area to guide sailors. Many local legends describe lost ships and tragedies at sea.

== Activities ==
The Iroise Sea enjoys a variety of activities. The French navy has been active there since 1631, when Brest was established as a naval base. Since the late 20th century, it has been a centre of submarine activity, owing to the nuclear submarine base established at Île Longue on the Crozon peninsula in the roadstead of Brest.

Fishing, though less important than in the past, is still practised, especially through the ports of Le Conquet, Douarnenez, Camaret and Brest. Catches range from crabs to sardines and monkfish. The area is also popular for sailing and pleasure boating, particularly in the less exposed areas along the coast and in Douarnenez Bay. Diving is also increasingly popular, particularly in view of the many accessible wrecks and spectacular underwater vistas.

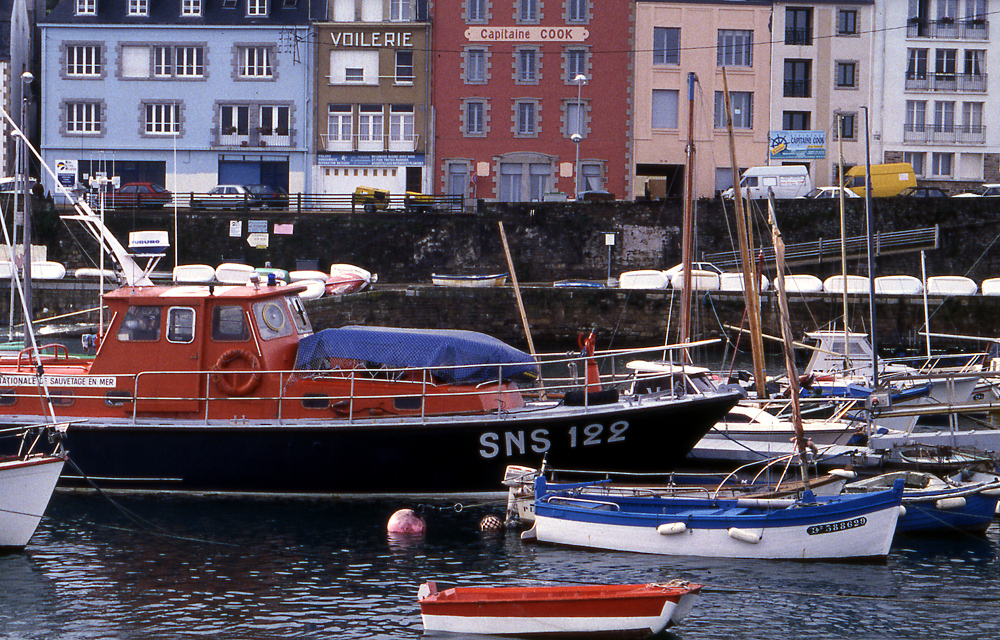
SNSM lifeboat in the port of Douarnenez

== Sea search and rescue ==
Owing to the hazardous conditions at sea, the high density of shipping and a number of shipwrecks in recent years, the French authorities have introduced special search and rescue operations. These rely on vessels such as the Abeille Bourbon, as well as a number of large lifeboats based in the ports of Douarnenez, Camaret, Le Conquet, Molène and Ushant.

== Marine Park ==
Despite several major oil spills and cases of overfishing, the Iroise Sea is still rich in flora and fauna. It is especially well known for its seabass, its shoals of dolphin, seals, lobsters and, on occasion, sunfish, basking shark and whales. The many varieties of seabird include cormorants, guillemots and herons. The sea is also recognized as the richest environment for seaweed in Europe, with some 300 species.

As a result, on 2 October 2007, the French authorities designated this area as the country's first marine park, officially labelled Parc naturel marin d'Iroise. Its three main objectives are to increase knowledge of the marine environment, to protect the area's habitats and species, and to develop marine activities of all kinds. The Iroise Marine Park covers an area of 3,550 km^{2} (1,370 sq mi) from latitude 48°31′N (the north coast of Ushant) and latitude 47°59′N (south coast of the Île de Sein), the mainland coastline to the east except for the Rade de Brest, and the 12-nautical-mile (22 km) limit on French territorial waters to the west.

== Ecology ==
The Iroise Sea is among the world's most important biogeographic transition zones. This is a dividing line between the temperate marine and the cold-temperate and boreal marine animals.

== See also ==
- Celtic Sea & North Atlantic
