= Guny =

- Commune
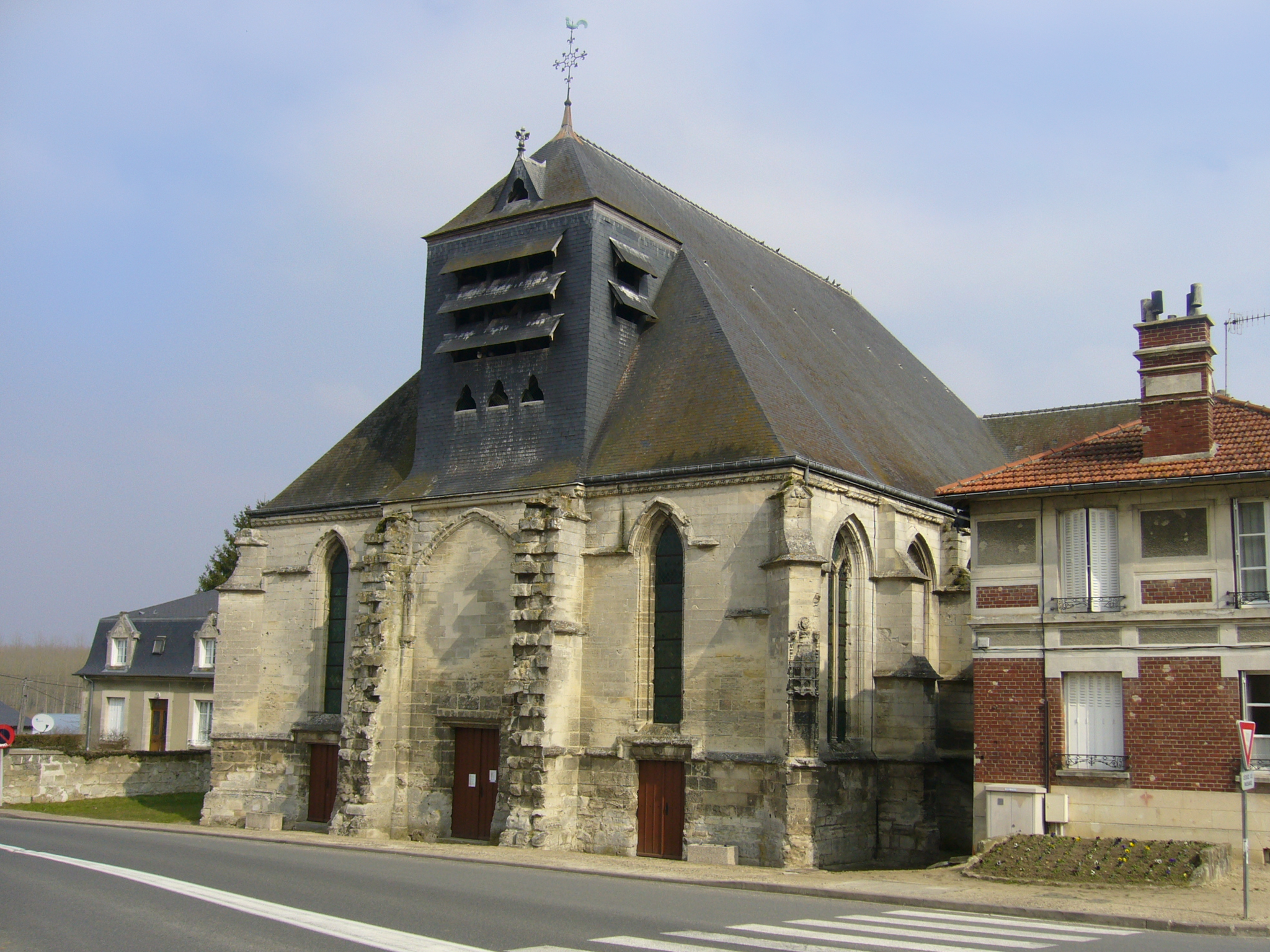
- The church of Guny
- Location of Guny
- Location within France Location within Hauts-de-France
- Coordinates: 49°31′11″N 3°16′06″E
- Country: France
- Region: Hauts-de-France
- Department: Aisne
- Arrondissement: Laon
- Canton: Vic-sur-Aisne

Government
  - Mayor (2026–32): Estelle Legrand
- Area^{1}: 9.32 km^{2} (3.60 sq mi)
- Elevation: 70 m (230 ft)
- Highest elevation: 152 m (499 ft)
- Lowest elevation: 42 m (138 ft)
- Population (2023): 357
  - Density: 38.3/km^{2} (99.2/sq mi)
- Time zone: UTC+01:00 (CET)
  - Summer (DST): UTC+02:00 (CEST)
- INSEE/Postal code: 02363 /02300
- ^{1} French Land Register data, which excludes lakes, ponds, glaciers > 1 km^{2} (0.386 sq mi or 247 acres) and river estuaries.

Guny (French pronunciation: [ɡyni]) is a commune in the Aisne department in Hauts-de-France in northern France.

== History ==
In 858, Guny's village is given to the abbey of Notre-Dame of Soissons by Charles the Bold.

In 1368, Enguerrand VII of Coucy grants the collectivity franchise to Guny and twenty-two other churches.

1914–1918, World War I devastated the village. From August 27 until September 28, the 11th and 20th infantry fight Battle of Ailette around Guny's quarries.

Saint Georges' church is destroyed. It was restored in 1923.

A new bell was inaugurated in November 1923, in a temporary church.

== Geography ==
The river Ailette forms all of the commune's northeastern border.

== Population ==
Historical population
Year	Pop.	±% p.a.
1968	562	—
1975	594	+0.79%
1982	549	−1.12%
1990	508	−0.97%
1999	447	−1.41%
2007	430	−0.48%
2012	458	+1.27%
2017	423	−1.58%
2023	357	−2.79%
Source: INSEE

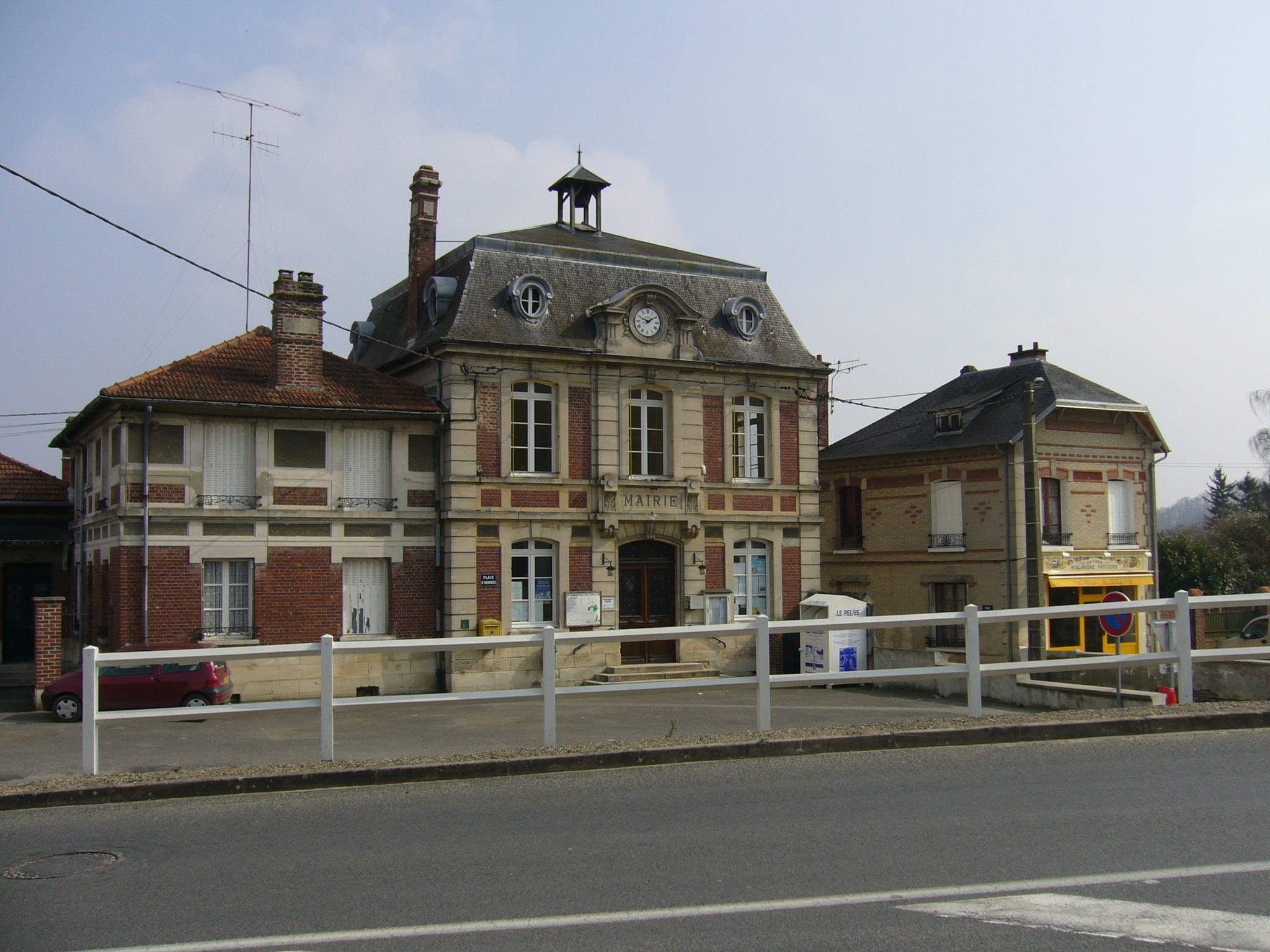
Town hall

== See also ==
- Communes of the Aisne department
