= Sizun =

- Commune
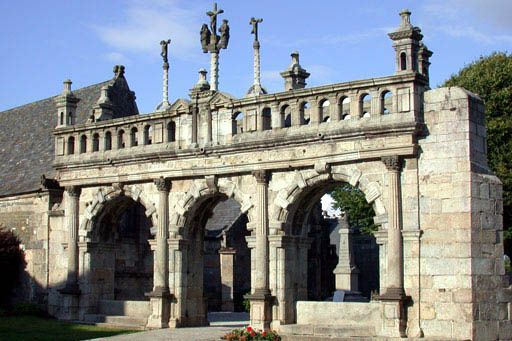
- Arc de Triomphe in Sizun

- Coat of arms
- Location of Sizun
- Location within France Location within Brittany
- Coordinates: 48°24′21″N 4°04′34″W
- Country: France
- Region: Brittany
- Department: Finistère
- Arrondissement: Morlaix
- Canton: Landivisiau
- Intercommunality: Pays de Landivisiau

Government
  - Mayor (2023–2026): Catherine Le Roux
- Area^{1}: 58.14 km^{2} (22.45 sq mi)
- Highest elevation: 382 m (1,253 ft)
- Lowest elevation: 61 m (200 ft)
- Population (2023): 2,325
  - Density: 39.99/km^{2} (103.6/sq mi)
- Time zone: UTC+01:00 (CET)
  - Summer (DST): UTC+02:00 (CEST)
- INSEE/Postal code: 29277 /29450
- ^{1} French Land Register data, which excludes lakes, ponds, glaciers > 1 km^{2} (0.386 sq mi or 247 acres) and river estuaries.

Sizun (French pronunciation: [sizœ̃]; Breton: Sizun) is a commune in the Finistère department of Brittany in north-western France.

== Geography ==
=== Climate ===
Sizun has an oceanic climate (Köppen climate classification Cfb). The average annual temperature in Sizun is 10.4 °C (50.7 °F). The average annual rainfall is 1,324.0 mm (52.13 in) with January as the wettest month. The temperatures are highest on average in August, at around 16.3 °C (61.3 °F), and lowest in February, at around 5.4 °C (41.7 °F). The highest temperature ever recorded in Sizun was 37.7 °C (99.9 °F) on 9 August 2003; the coldest temperature ever recorded was −11.3 °C (11.7 °F) on 17 January 1985.

Climate data for Sizun (1981–2010 averages, extremes 1983−present)
Month	Jan	Feb	Mar	Apr	May	Jun	Jul	Aug	Sep	Oct	Nov	Dec	Year
Record high °C (°F)	16.2 (61.2)	21.7 (71.1)	23.7 (74.7)	28.4 (83.1)	29.3 (84.7)	33.8 (92.8)	34.7 (94.5)	37.7 (99.9)	31.2 (88.2)	28.6 (83.5)	21.0 (69.8)	17.2 (63.0)	37.7 (99.9)
Mean daily maximum °C (°F)	8.0 (46.4)	8.2 (46.8)	10.4 (50.7)	12.4 (54.3)	15.8 (60.4)	18.5 (65.3)	20.3 (68.5)	20.6 (69.1)	18.5 (65.3)	14.8 (58.6)	10.6 (51.1)	8.5 (47.3)	13.9 (57.0)
Daily mean °C (°F)	5.5 (41.9)	5.4 (41.7)	7.2 (45.0)	8.6 (47.5)	11.7 (53.1)	14.2 (57.6)	16.1 (61.0)	16.3 (61.3)	14.4 (57.9)	11.5 (52.7)	7.8 (46.0)	5.9 (42.6)	10.4 (50.7)
Mean daily minimum °C (°F)	3.0 (37.4)	2.6 (36.7)	4.0 (39.2)	4.8 (40.6)	7.6 (45.7)	9.9 (49.8)	11.9 (53.4)	11.9 (53.4)	10.2 (50.4)	8.2 (46.8)	5.1 (41.2)	3.2 (37.8)	6.9 (44.4)
Record low °C (°F)	−11.3 (11.7)	−8.0 (17.6)	−4.6 (23.7)	−3.8 (25.2)	−2.0 (28.4)	2.0 (35.6)	2.5 (36.5)	3.4 (38.1)	1.9 (35.4)	−2.0 (28.4)	−5.0 (23.0)	−9.0 (15.8)	−11.3 (11.7)
Average precipitation mm (inches)	162.7 (6.41)	127.1 (5.00)	105.8 (4.17)	101.3 (3.99)	84.0 (3.31)	63.9 (2.52)	71.4 (2.81)	75.9 (2.99)	95.7 (3.77)	132.5 (5.22)	145.4 (5.72)	158.3 (6.23)	1,324 (52.13)
Average precipitation days (≥ 1.0 mm)	18.0	15.0	14.6	14.0	11.7	9.4	11.1	10.8	11.0	15.0	17.4	17.0	164.9
Source: Meteociel

== Population ==
Inhabitants of Sizun are called in French Sizuniens.

Historical population

Year	Pop.	±% p.a.
1793	2,888	—
1821	3,156	+0.32%
1846	3,843	+0.79%
1872	3,716	−0.13%
1901	3,685	−0.03%
1926	3,123	−0.66%
1946	2,608	−0.90%
1962	2,201	−1.05%
1968	2,025	−1.38%

Year	Pop.	±% p.a.
1975	1,787	−1.77%
1982	1,765	−0.18%
1990	1,728	−0.26%
1999	1,850	+0.76%
2007	2,168	+2.00%
2012	2,234	+0.60%
2017	2,265	+0.28%
2023	2,325	+0.44%

Source: EHESS and INSEE (1968-2023)

== Breton language ==
In 2008, 19.74% of primary-school children attended bilingual schools.

== See also ==
- Communes of the Finistère department
- Parc naturel régional d'Armorique
- Sizun Parish close
