= Pont-de-Buis-lès-Quimerch =

Pont-de-Buis-lès-Quimerch Pont-ar-Veuzenn-Kimerc'h
- Commune
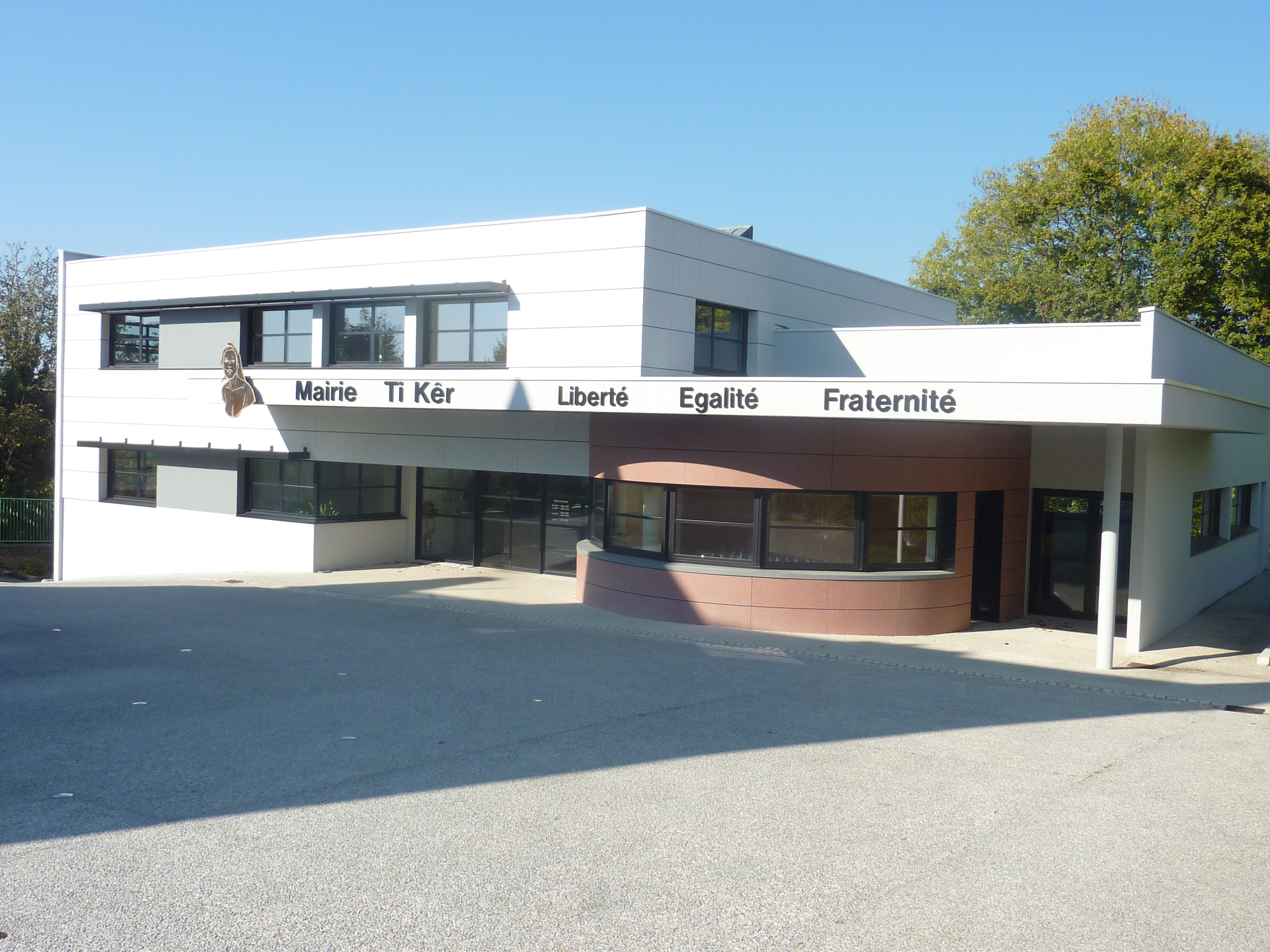
- The modern town hall in Pont-de-Buis-lès-Quimerch

- Coat of arms
- Location of Pont-de-Buis-lès-Quimerch
- Location within France Location within Brittany
- Coordinates: 48°15′19″N 4°05′18″W
- Country: France
- Region: Brittany
- Department: Finistère
- Arrondissement: Châteaulin
- Canton: Pont-de-Buis-lès-Quimerch
- Intercommunality: Presqu'île de Crozon-Aulne maritime

Government
  - Mayor (2020–2026): Pascal Prigent
- Area^{1}: 41.39 km^{2} (15.98 sq mi)
- Highest elevation: 278 m (912 ft)
- Lowest elevation: 0 m (0 ft)
- Population (2023): 3,663
  - Density: 88.50/km^{2} (229.2/sq mi)
- Time zone: UTC+01:00 (CET)
  - Summer (DST): UTC+02:00 (CEST)
- INSEE/Postal code: 29302 /29590
- ^{1} French Land Register data, which excludes lakes, ponds, glaciers > 1 km^{2} (0.386 sq mi or 247 acres) and river estuaries.

Pont-de-Buis-lès-Quimerch (French pronunciation: [pɔ̃ də bɥi lɛ kimɛʁ]; Breton: Pont-ar-Veuzenn-Kimerc'h) is a commune in the Finistère department of Brittany in north-western France. The commune was created in 1949 under the name Pont-de-Buis from parts of Le Faou, Quimerch and Saint-Ségal. In 1965 it absorbed the former communes Logonna-Quimerch and Quimerch, and its name was changed to Pont-de-Buis-lès-Quimerch.

== Population ==
Inhabitants of Pont-de-Buis-lès-Quimerch are called in French Pontdebuisiens.

Historical population
Year	Pop.	±% p.a.
1968	3,999	—
1975	3,916	−0.30%
1982	3,710	−0.77%
1990	3,373	−1.18%
1999	3,385	+0.04%
2007	3,715	+1.17%
2012	3,863	+0.78%
2017	3,792	−0.37%
2023	3,663	−0.58%
Source: INSEE

== See also ==
- Communes of the Finistère department
- Parc naturel régional d'Armorique
