= Élorn =

River in France

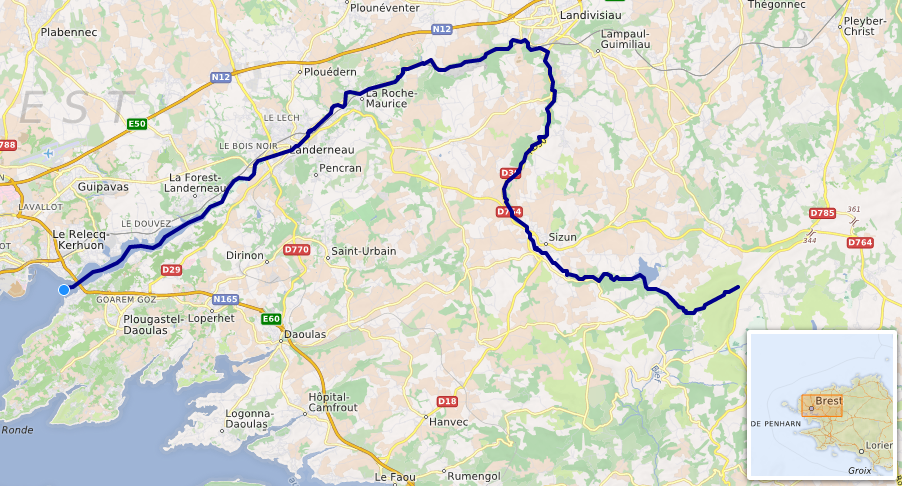

Location
- Country: France

Physical characteristics
- Source
  - location: Brittany
- Mouth
  - location: Atlantic Ocean
  - coordinates: 48°23′6″N 4°24′27″W
- Length: 56.4 km (35.0 mi)

The Élorn (French pronunciation: [elɔʁn]; Breton: Elorn) is a 56.4-kilometre (35 mi) long river in Brittany, France. Its source is in the monts d'Arrée, 1.5 kilometres (0.9 mi) north-northeast of Le Tuchenn Kador, and it then runs through several small towns such as Sizun and Landivisiau before flowing out into the roadstead of Brest.

The maritime part of the river stops at Landerneau, where the Pont de Rohan blocks seaborne ships from sailing any further upstream. The river also crosses the château de la Roche-Maurice and many abandoned mills, and on the banks of its maritime part are several family properties belonging to families in Brest (Park an Coat, le Frout, Beau Repos, le Petit Manoir de Poul ar Velin). At low tide the mud is met, at high tide the sea flows over the countryside.

Bridge over the Élorn
