= Childers Incident =

Opening shots between British and French forces during the French Revolutionary Wars

Coordinates: 48°19′00″N 4°35′50″W

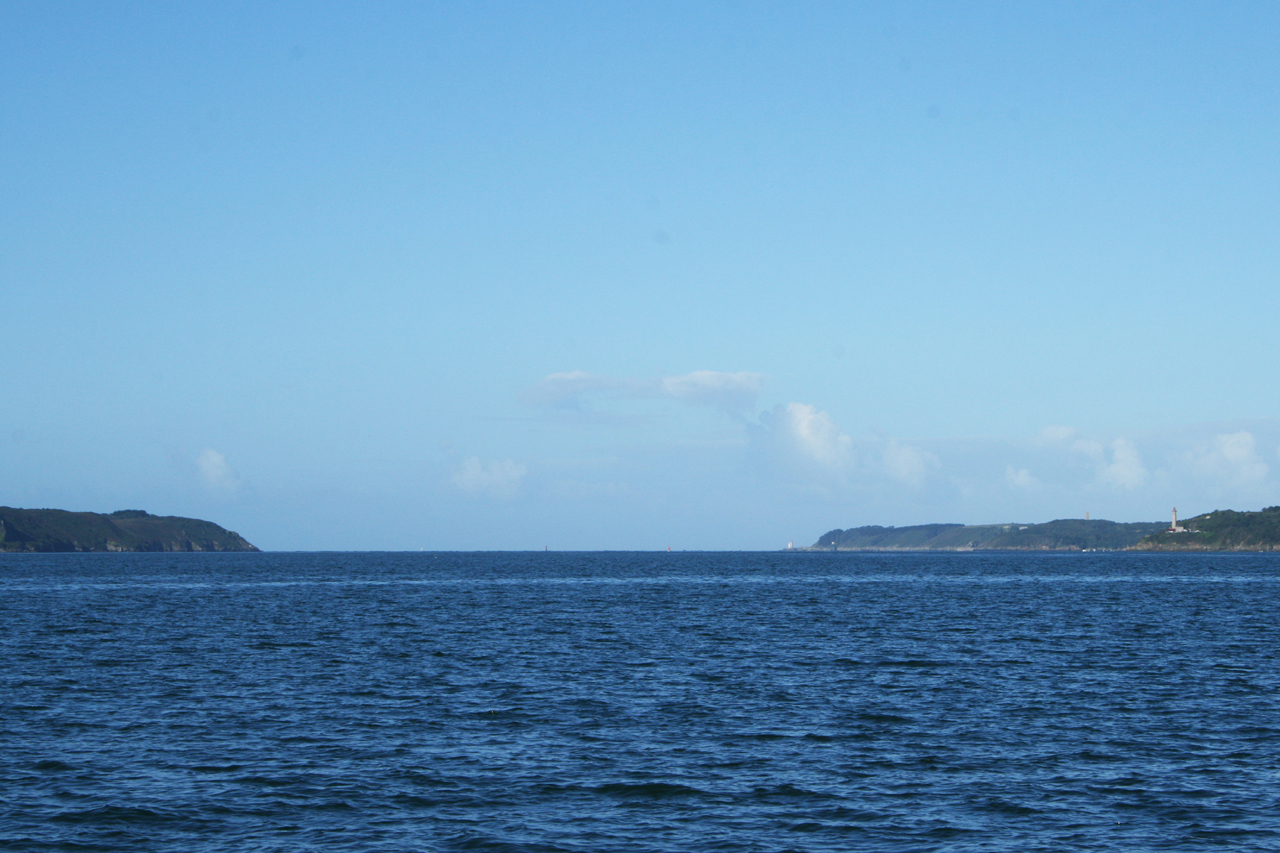
Goulet de Brest

The Childers Incident of 2 January 1793 marked the opening shots between British and French forces during the French Revolutionary Wars, the first phase of a 23-year-long war between the two countries. Following the French Revolution of 1789, diplomatic relations between the Kingdom of Great Britain and the French Republic had steadily deteriorated and France was in political and social turmoil. One of the strongest hotbeds of republican activity was the principal Atlantic naval base of the French Navy at Brest in Brittany, the scene of a significant mutiny in 1790.

On 2 January a small British warship, the 14-gun brig HMS Childers under Commander Robert Barlow, was ordered to enter the Roadstead of Brest to reconnoitre the state of readiness of the French fleet. As Childers entered the Goulet de Brest, the vessel came under fire from French batteries flying the tricolour. Although Barlow clearly identified his brig as a neutral British vessel the fire continued until he was able to withdraw. Although Childers had been struck by a 48 lb (22 kg) cannonball, none of the crew were wounded. The incident was of itself inconsequential, with minimal damage and no casualties on either side, but it marked a symbolic moment in the deterioration of relations between Britain and France in the approach to war, which broke out on 1 February 1793.

== Background ==
Following the French Revolution of 1789 relations between the newly declared French Republic and its European neighbours sharply deteriorated. In April 1791, the Declaration of Pillnitz was jointly issued by Austria and Prussia stating their support for King Louis XVI. In February 1792 Austria and Prussia formally allied and the French Legislative Assembly responded on 20 April 1792 by declaring war on Austria. This first conflict, known as the War of the First Coalition, began on land as other than France the principal European maritime powers remained neutral. The arrest of the French king in August 1792 and the expansion of the war into Northern Italy brought about the start of the naval war in the Mediterranean Sea.

Britain had remained neutral throughout the first stages of the war. Although unsympathetic to the violence and upheaval of the French Revolution, Britain's Prime Minister William Pitt the Younger was unwilling to go to war alongside the absolutist monarchies of Europe. Nevertheless, the Royal Navy had made extensive preparations for war should it occur, starting with the Spanish Armament of 1790. The French Atlantic Fleet however was in poor condition: the principal fleet base at Brest in Brittany had been the scene of a significant mutiny in 1790 and by 1791 desertion rates among French naval officers were running at more than 80%. Despite its strong republican politics and command difficulties, the fleet itself was very strong, having been expanded and improved during the 1780s – indeed the tax rises to pay for the French Navy had been one of the causes of the original Revolution in 1789.

== Childers incident ==
Map of the Roadstead of Brest

The strength of the French Atlantic fleet was a major cause of concern to the British Admiralty, and in late 1792 orders were issued for the small British brig, the 14-gun HMS Childers under Commander Robert Barlow, to enter the Roadstead of Brest and investigate the state of readiness of the French fleet.

On 2 January 1793, Childers was approaching the entrance to the roadstead under overcast skies and with a light, unreliable breeze. The only entrance to Brest harbour is through a narrow waterway known as the Goulet de Brest. The Goulet lies between the Pointe du Petit Minou and the Pointe du Portzic on the north shore and the îlot des Capucins and the Pointe des Espagnols on the Roscanvel peninsula to the south. Due to its importance as the entrance to Brest, the shores of the Goulet were heavily fortified. As Childers entered the Goulet one of the forts covering the entrance from the southern shore fired a shot at a distance of 0.75 nautical miles (1.39 km) which passed over the brig into the sea beyond.

Assuming this warning shot had been fired in the belief that his brig, which was not flying a flag, may be an enemy vessel, Barlow ordered the British naval ensign and the pennant of the Channel Fleet run up. Thus clearly identified as a neutral British warship, Barlow allowed Childers to drift closer inshore with the tide. The French battery responded by raising tricolour flags and red pennants, a move copied by the other batteries covering the Goulet. Having drifted much closer to two batteries Childers suddenly came under heavy fire, the batteries containing very large 48-pounder cannon.

Under fire and with the wind too calm for sailing, Barlow ran out oars to try and pull his brig away from the French batteries. The diminutive size of his vessel made it a difficult target and he was soon able to take advantage of a fresh breeze to withdraw from the crossfire. A single shot struck the brig, smashing into one of the 4-pounder cannon on deck and breaking it into three pieces, although none of the crew were wounded by the strike.

== Aftermath ==
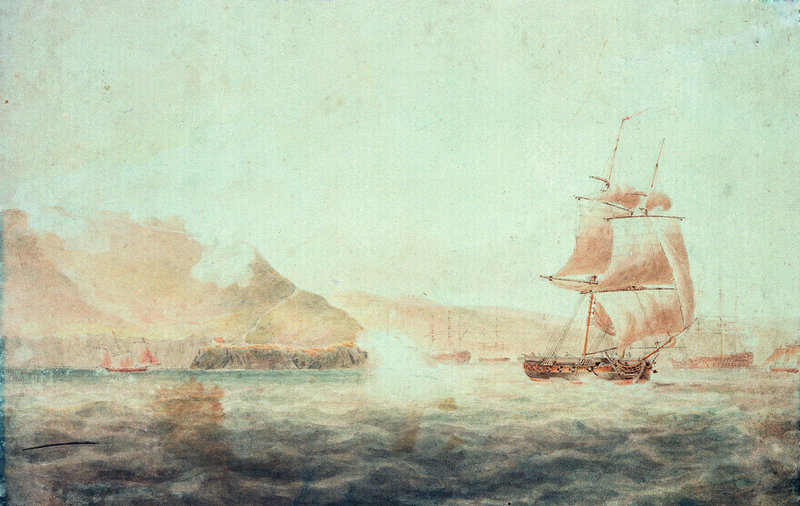
French batteries firing at Childers off Brest 1793; National Maritime Museum

Having successfully withdrawn Childers from danger, Barlow returned to Britain on 4 January after battling a strong gale in the Channel. Anchoring at the small Cornish port of Fowey, Barlow took an express coach directly to the Admiralty in London, arriving on 11 January carrying the 48 lb (22 kg) cannonball as evidence of the incident and what British historian William James called the "strong spirit of hostility on the part of the new republic". Historian Edward Pelham Brenton, writing in 1825, noted however that French hostility on this occasion was justified, commenting that "in the then troubled state of Europe Childers and her captain had no business to be prying into the equipments at Brest within gunshot of the forts: if we had seen a French vessel of war running from the Needles to St Helens, and making observations, I suspect we should, at such a crisis, have taken the liberty to bring her to action."

On 24 January the French ambassador was expelled in response to the Execution of Louis XVI in Paris on 21 January and on 1 February the National Convention declared war on Great Britain. The naval campaign in the Atlantic began in earnest in March 1793, when a French battle squadron briefly put to sea before a mutiny forced it to return. The war between Britain and France begun in the Goulet on 2 January 1793 was to last, with a 14-month break in 1802–1803, until 1815.

== Bibliography ==
- Brenton, Edward Pelham (1837) [1825]. The Naval History of Great Britain, Vol. I. London: C. Rice.
- Chandler, David (1999) [1993]. Dictionary of the Napoleonic Wars. Ware, Hertfordshire: Wordsworth Military Library. ISBN 1-84022-203-4.
- Gardiner, Robert (2001) [1996]. Fleet Battle and Blockade. London: Caxton Editions. ISBN 978-1-86176-018-0.
- James, William (2002) [1827]. The Naval History of Great Britain, Volume 1, 1793–1796. London: Conway Maritime Press. ISBN 0-85177-905-0.
- Tracy, Nicholas (1998). The Naval Chronicle, Volume 1, 1793–1798. London: Chatham Publishing. ISBN 1-86176-091-4.
- Woodman, Richard (2001). The Sea Warriors. London: Constable Publishers. ISBN 1-84119-183-3.
