= Le Minou =

Beach and lighthouse at Brest harbor, France

Coordinates: 48°20′23″N 4°37′5″W

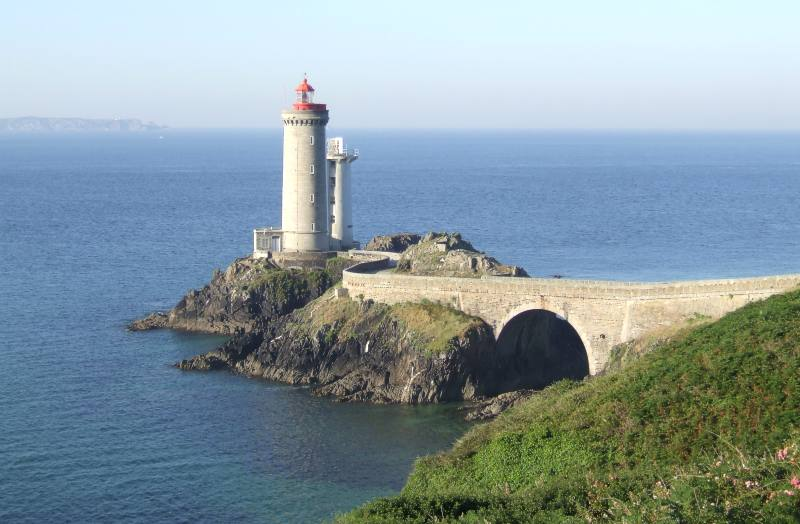
Phare du Petit Minou

Le Minou (Breton: Kazh-Koad) is the site of a popular surfing beach and a lighthouse at the entrance to Brest harbor in France. It is part of the commune of Plouzané, on the north side of the Goulet de Brest.

"Le Minou" means "pussy cat" in French. Le Minou is the site of the landfall of the first French transatlantic telegraph cable in 1869.

== See also ==
- Petit Minou Lighthouse
