= Kerbonn =

Coordinates: 48°16′9″N 4°36′58″W

Kerbonn (French pronunciation: [kɛʁbɔn]) is a village in the commune of Camaret-sur-Mer in France, between the pointe de Pen-Hir and the pointe du Toulinguet, on the Crozon peninsula. As well as its fortifications, the site also houses the ruins of the manor of Coecilian.

== Kerbonn batteries ==
Kerbonn's many fortifications form part of the defences of the goulet de Brest. The first fortification on the site is a mortar battery dating to 1889-1891, with its underground magazine. The Fort de Kerbonn is a side battery, designed to fire on ships in the roadstead of Brest. Another French battery was built in 1932, and between 1942 and 1944 the Germans built four casemates on the site to house French 164mm guns, 6 air-raid shelters, one fire-direction post and three anti-aircraft-gun positions. One of these German casemates now houses a memorial to the Battle of the Atlantic.
