= Model-tower, 1811 type =

Defensive fortification

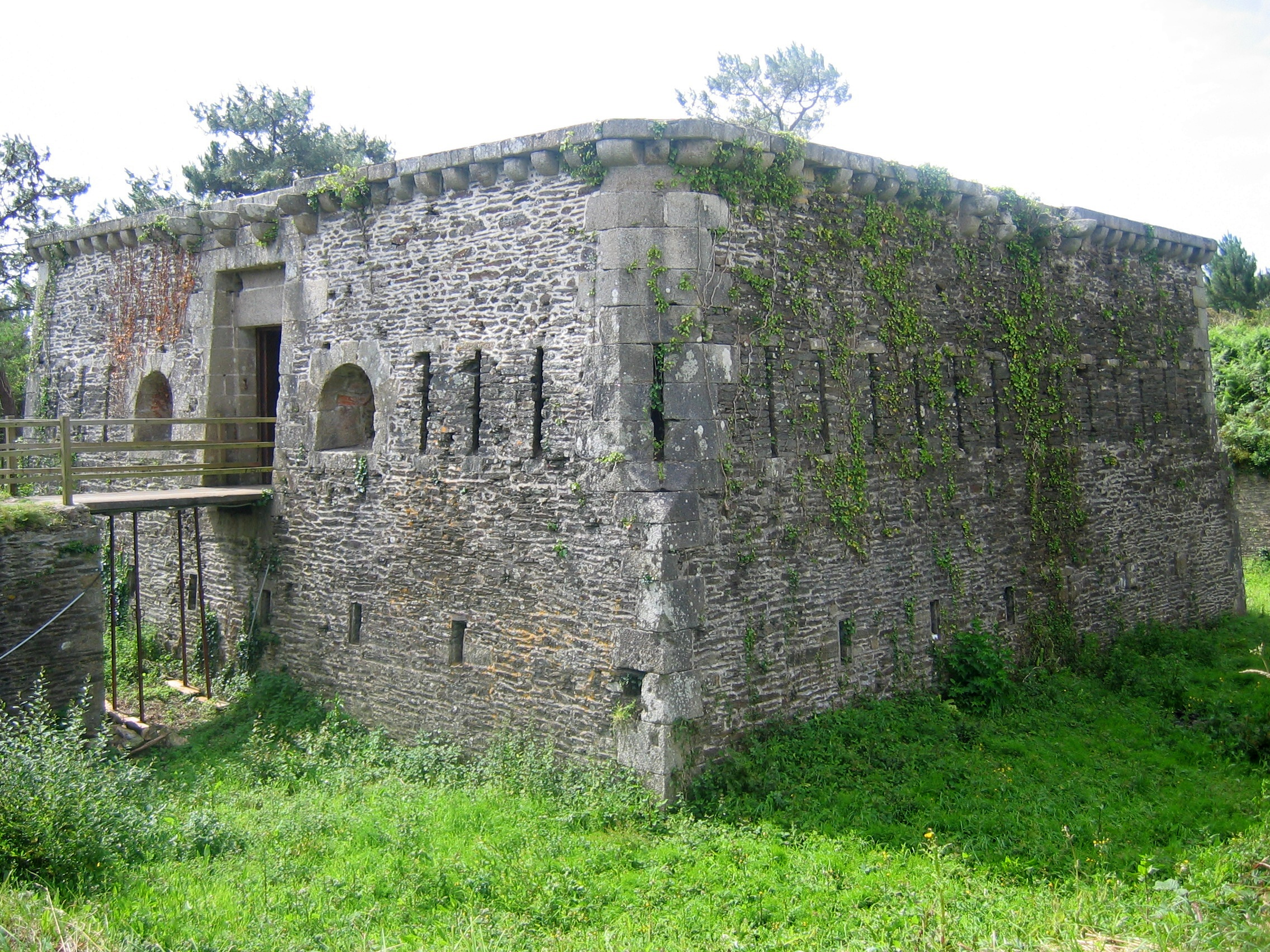
Model 1 tower in Pointe des Espagnols

A model tower (tour-modèle), also known as an Empire tower or a Napoleon tower, was a standardised defensive fortification created in 1811. Construction began along the Atlantic and Mediterranean coastlines the following year but the project was abandoned in 1814 with only 12 towers being completed.

== History ==
Napoleon I wished to organise France's coastal defences and so demanded the construction of a fortification combining powder magazines, food storehouses and gunners' lodgings in one building Napoleon's idea was that the cannons in coastal batteries were very vulnerable to enemy raids and so they could be made safer by combining these elements in a single building. As a coastal defensive chain, they can be compared to the United Kingdom's near-contemporaneous chain of Martello towers (built between 1804 and 1812).

This defence programme is known by the name "model towers and redoubts, 1811 type". Their construction programme was begun in 1812 and was originally intended to run for ten years, but it was abandoned on Napoleon's abdication in 1814. Of the 160 model works originally planned (106 on the Atlantic coast, and 54 in the Mediterranean), only 12 towers were completed by 1814, including six in Finistère around the roadstead of Brest (listed below). Louis-Philippe of France attempted to emulate Napoleon and complete this defence chain in 1846 with a set of standardised crenellated guardhouses.

== Types ==
=== 1 (model tower) ===
Model 1 is 16m wide and could house 60 men, along with four 24- or 18-pounder cannons.

- Pointe de Cornouaille, Roscanvel
- Pointe des Espagnols (parapet razed), Roscanvel

=== 2 (model tower) ===
Model 2 is 10.5m wide and could house 30 men, 1 field gun and 2 caronades.

=== 3 (model tower) ===
Model 3 is 9m wide and could house 18 men (or 12 men and a battery 'guardian') and 2 caronades.

- Pointe du Toulinguet, Camaret-sur-Mer
- Pointe du Créac'h Meur (second level and razed parapets), Plougonvelin
- Pointe du Grand-Minou, Locmaria-Plouzané
- Saint-Marzin, Plougonvelin

=== 4 (defensive guardhouse) ===
9m wide, it was built on 2 levels.

=== 5 (defensive guardhouse) ===
9m wide, it was only built on one level.
