= Pointe de Cornouaille =

Hamlet of Kerviniou in France

Coordinates: 48°19′49″N 4°34′16″W

La pointe de Cornouaille (French pronunciation: [pwɛ̃t də kɔʁnwaj]; Breton: beg Kernev-Veur) is a cape to the north of the hamlet of Kerviniou in France. They are both situated on the Roscanvel peninsula and, facing as it does the Fort du Mengant, a battery on the point forms part of the defences of the goulet de Brest. Known defences on the site include:

- Lower battery (1694) - built to plans by Vauban
- Tour modèle n°1 (1813) - see Tour-modèle type 1811
- Batterie de rupture sous roc (1888)
- Batterie du plateau (1897)
- Batterie de DCA allemande (1943, German)
- Torpedo-boat battery (German)
