= Goulet de Brest =

Coordinates: 48°20′30″N 4°34′0″W

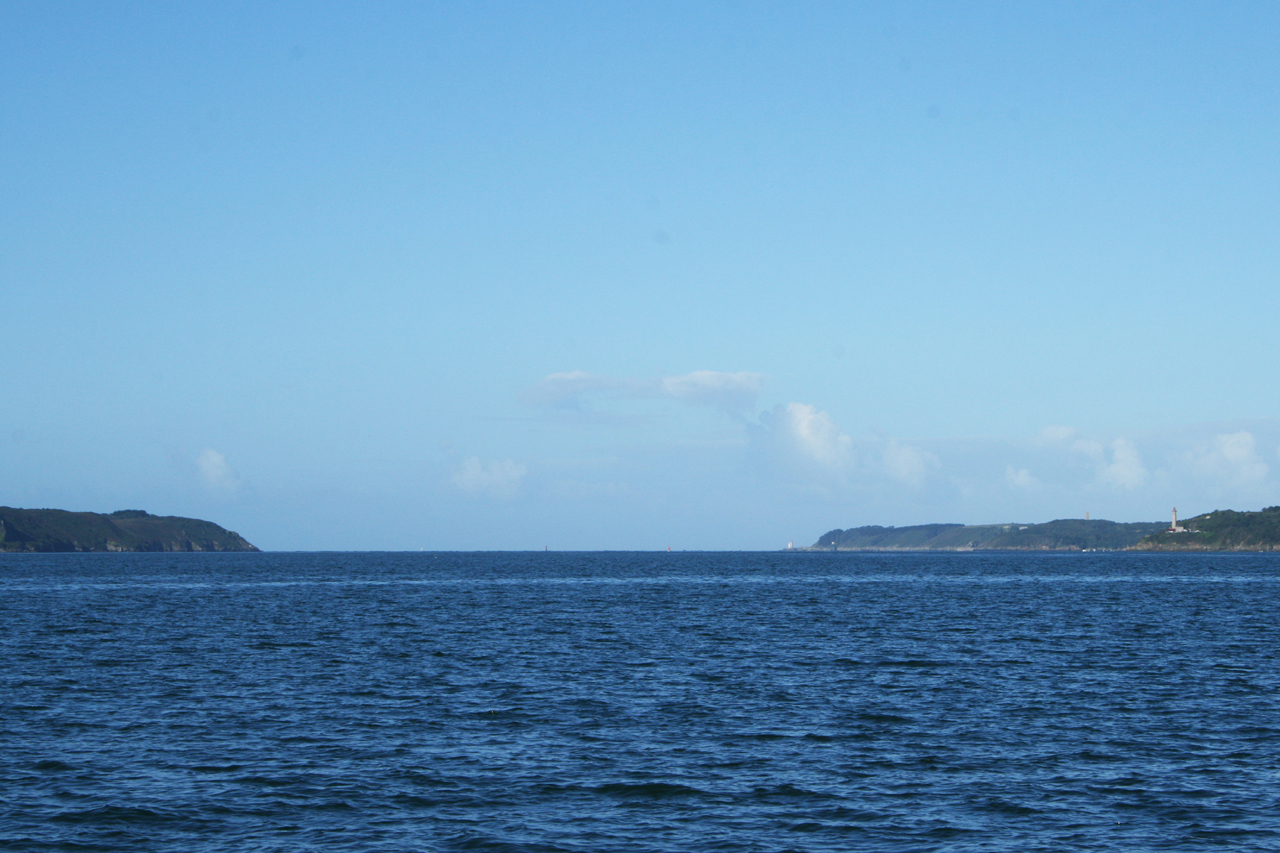
Goulet de Brest, with the Phare du Portzic

The goulet is centred on the left edge of this map (unlabelled, below the compass rose), north of the presqu'île de Roscanvel (peninsula) and south of the starred Pointe du Portzic. The goulet’s northwestern limit, the Pointe du Petit Minou, is outside of the map.

The Goulet de Brest (French pronunciation: [ɡulɛ də bʁɛst]; Breton: Mulgul Brest) is a 3-km-long strait linking the roadstead of Brest to the Atlantic Ocean. Only 1.8 km wide, the goulet is situated between the Pointe du Petit Minou and the Pointe du Portzic to the north and the îlot des Capucins and the Pointe des Espagnols to the south.

At each turn of the tide, the ocean refills the roadstead in a current that can attain 4 to 5 knots. Sailing ships would thus wait in the cove of Camaret-sur-Mer for a favourable current to carry them into the goulet.

On 2 January 1793, the Childers Incident – the first shots of the war between Great Britain and France during the French Revolutionary Wars – took place in the goulet.

== Military significance ==
It is the only opening into the roadstead of Brest, and thus the only access to the town. Consequently, successive French governments have lined the goulet with military installations to protect the town and the naval fleet based there, and to keep a watch on shipping using it. The geography of the goulet favours the defenders, as it has a spine down its length, in the form of the Le Mengant rocks, which force ships to sail either to their north or south.

The body of water is surrounded by these areas and sites (nearby or at a moderate distance):

Area around Brest
North shore

- Fort de Bertheaume
- Fort de Toulbroc'h
- Fort du Petit Minou
- Fort du Mengant (Fort du Léon)
- Fort du Dellec
- Fort de Portzic

Area around Roscanvel
South shore peninsula

- Fort of the îlot des Capucins
- Fort de la Fraternité
- îlot du Diable
- Fortified lines of Quélern
- Batteries of Kerviniou
- Batteries of Tremet
- Fort on pointe des Espagnols
- Powder-stores of the Île des Morts
- Battery of Cornouaille

Area around Camaret-sur-Mer
Southwest; not directly bordering the goulet, but Camaret Bay

- Batteries of Kerbonn
- Batteries of Le Toulinguet
- Batteries of Pointe du Petit Gouin and Pointe du Grand Gouin
- Tour Vauban, a tower
