= Tremet =

Coordinates: 48°17′57″N 4°34′16″W

Tremet is a hamlet on the Roscanvel peninsula in France. The gun batteries located here are part of the defences of the goulet de Brest, forbidding ships from entering the bay of Camaret-sur-Mer. The site had been occupied by the military since 1694 (a battery was probably sited here in Vauban's defensive scheme) and was updated several times in the 18th and 19th centuries. The battery became a heavy anti-aircraft post in 1955 as part of the outer defences of Brest's military fort - part of that battery is still part of the military land around Quélern and not open to the public.
