= Tour Vauban =

Coordinates: 48°16′48″N 4°35′31″W

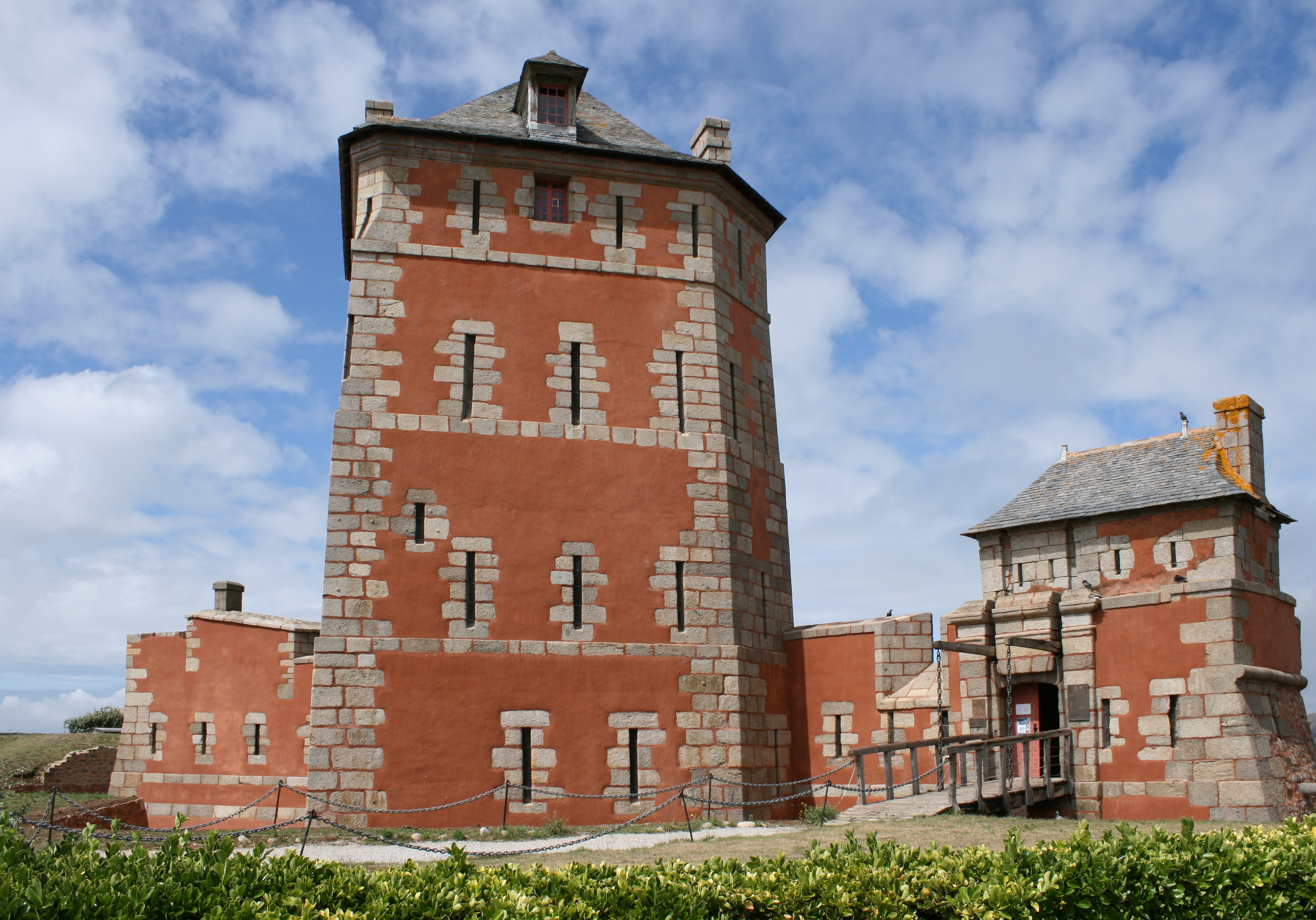
Tour Vauban

The Tour Vauban (Vauban Tower), initially known as the tour de Camaret, is an 18m-high polygonal defensive tower built to a plan by Vauban on the Sillon at Camaret-sur-Mer, as part of the fortifications of the goulet de Brest. It has three levels and is flanked by walls, a guardhouse and a gun battery which can hold 11 cannons as well as a cannonball foundry added in the French Revolution period.

Drafted in 1683, the tower was designed in 1689 by Vauban and construction was supervised by the military engineer Jean-Pierre Traverse from 1693 to completion in 1696. The 11 cannons in the battery are believed to have been forged with those for the battery on pointe du Grand Gouin, for the Quélern defensive-lines and the many neighbouring batteries. In the French victory in the Battle of Camaret on 18 June 1694, the battery and its two guard houses were only armed with nine 24-pounder cannon and three mortars firing 30 cm balls.

On 18 June 1694 Vauban himself was in command of the garrison when they repelled an Anglo-Dutch attack. The battery put several British vessels out of action. On land, a charge by French dragoons scattered the British troops that had landed, and the local militia helped complete the victory. The French claimed to have killed 1200 attackers and captured 450 prisoners. Vauban's forces claimed to have only suffered 45 men wounded. British estimates were that they had lost 700 soldiers killed, wounded, and captured, and that 400 men aboard the ships were killed or wounded. A Dutch frigate of 20 guns also was sunk.

The Anglo-Dutch fleet anchored between Camaret Bay and Bertheaume. Consequently, Tour Vauban also received some support from Fort de Bertheaume on the opposite side of the Goulet de Brest.

Camaret-sur-Mer is a member of the network of major Vauban sites. Since 7 July 2008 the tour Vauban and 11 other sites have been classified as a UNESCO World Heritage Site due to their outstanding engineering and testimony to Vauban's influence on military strategy and architecture from the 17th through the 19th centuries.
