= Fort de Portzic =

Coordinates: 48°21′31″N 4°32′8″W

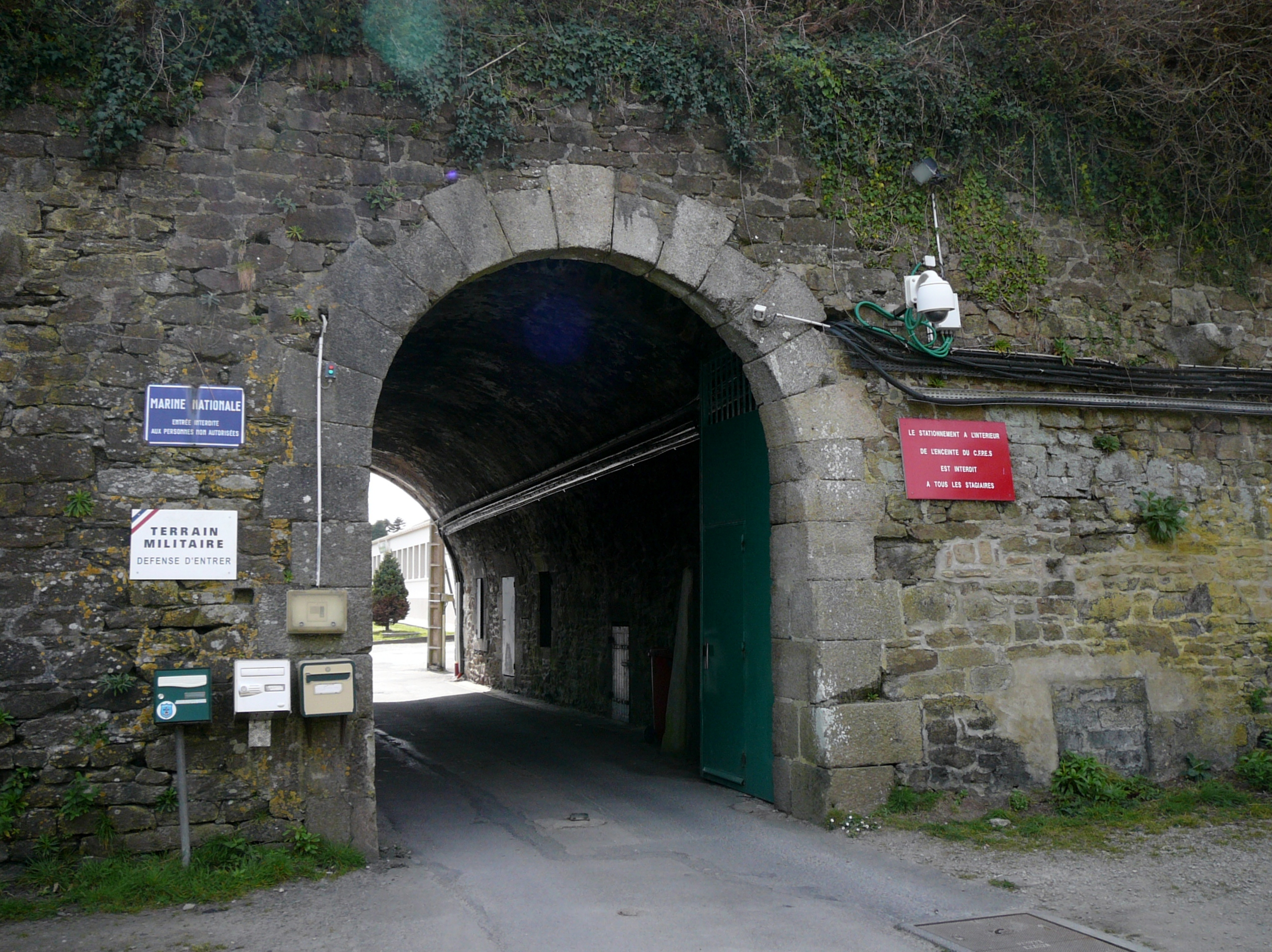
Entrance to Fort de Portzic

The Fort de Portzic was built near the town of Brest by Vauban between 1693 and 1699 as part of the defences of the goulet de Brest. It faces the pointe des Espagnols and was improved and enlarged over time (including the Phare du Portzic in 1848 and a semaphore station in 1987), since it formed the town's last and innermost defence. The buildings on the site remain in military use. Nearby is the lighthouse Phare du Portzic.
