= Pointe du Grand Gouin =

Coordinates: 48°17′15″N 4°36′3″W

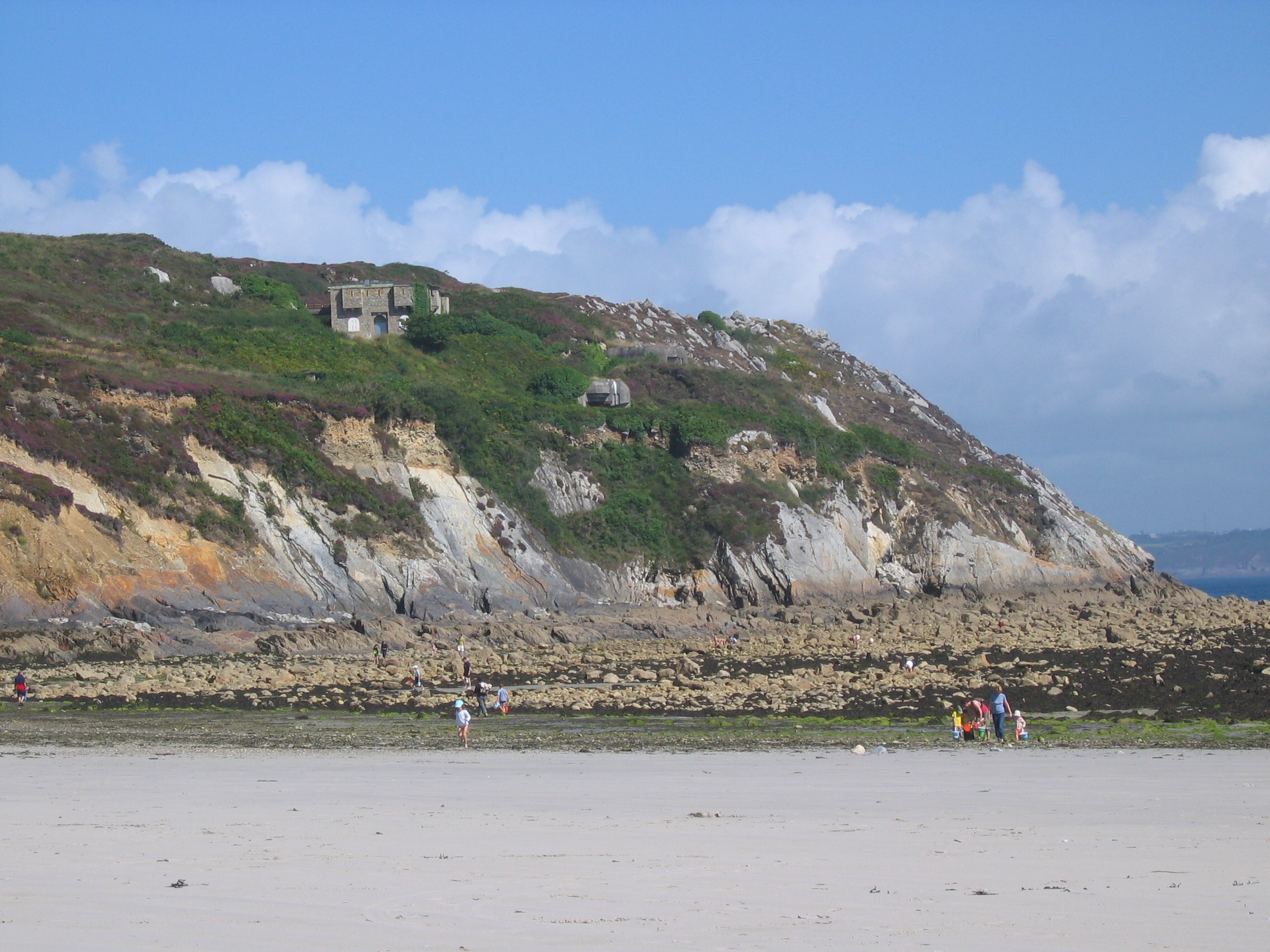
Pointe du Grand Gouin

The pointe du Grand Gouin (French pronunciation: [pwɛ̃t dy ɡʁɑ̃ ɡwɛ̃]; Breton: poent ar Gouin Bras) is a rocky promontory with vertical cliffs to the west of the inlet of Camaret-sur-Mer in France. It protects a port which, in Vauban's era, was vulnerable to possible landings. It is divided into the Grand Gouin (the top of the cliff) and the Petit Gouin (mid-cliff).

== Grand Gouin ==
In 1693, Vauban began to organise the defences of Brest with batteries and fortifications all along the Camaret bay, from the pointe du Gouin to the Quélern lines (Louis XIV had been warned of an Anglo-Dutch attack in the area, but did not know its precise landing point). In 1695 a mortar battery was set up on the Grand Gouin, though its location is now unknown. These mortar batteries could be directed towards the Cameret inlet and crossed their field of fire with those at Tremet, as well as covering the goulet de Brest to harry an approaching enemy.

The Germans built a platform for four 220mm Schneider guns on a new site here between 1942 and 1943, known as Camaret battery and manned by the 1/1274 HKAA (Heeres-Küsten-Artillerie-Abteilung). This had a range of 22 km and formed the most important coastal defence for the Crozon peninsula. It was made up of four batteries (one gun each), each accompanied by four bunkers, as well as a fire-direction point and many anti-aircraft guns.

== Petit Gouin ==
A battery was built here in 1813, and reorganised in 1859 (during the reinforcement of coastal defence begun in 1841) as a model-redoubt (1846 type, number two). In 1941 the Germans added 2 barrack-casemates on a platform, both armed with nearby 105 mm guns. There is also an underground magazine on the site.
