= Kerviniou Batteries =

Coordinates: 48°19′28″N 4°34′40″W

The batteries de Kerviniou are artillery batteries built in the late 19th and early 20th centuries, and are made up of an upper battery (1891) and an underground magazine (1891) Located on the Roscanvel peninsula facing the Fort du Mengant, they are a late addition to the defences of the goulet de Brest (a lower battery near the site, dating to 1695, has not yet been found). Demilitarised in 1915, they are open to the public.
