= Fort de Bertheaume =

Fort in Plougonvelin, in the Department of Finistère, France, located on a tidal island

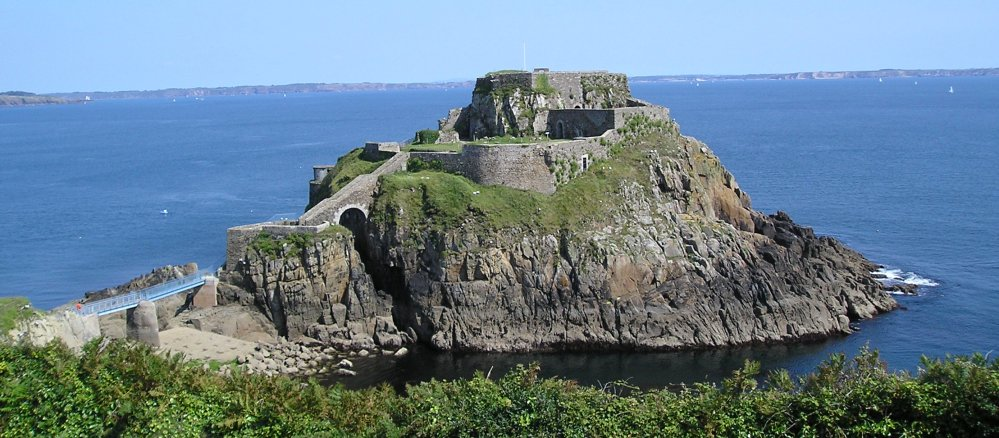
Fort de Bertheaume in 2004

Fort de Bertheaume is a fort in Plougonvelin, in the Department of Finistère, France, in the cultural region of Brittany. It is located on a tidal island that nowadays connects to the mainland via a footbridge. The fort sits well above sea level, and its steep cliffs have rendered it easily defended for centuries. Since the 17th century, the fort's role has been to monitor the Goulet de Brest, the straits of Brest.

== Name ==
The source of the site's name is a mystery. The Breton name is Kastel Persel. A plausible origin is that the fort was named for Saint Bertram, the founder of the city of Stafford. Alternatively, the name has been etymologised as Breton [A]ber C'homm ('bay of the valley', related to the Welsh words aber and cwm.

== History ==
People have used the site for a long time. Flints dating to the Stone Age have been found. A site on the cliff suggests the long-term presence of a workshop for making small flints. The flints are sufficiently distinctive that archaeologists have named the period the Berteaume Mesolithic.

On the land part of the site there are Bronze Age chamber tombs.

There are few traces of Roman presence. Some shards of pottery date back to the 2nd and 3rd Centuries C.E., and there are fragments of tile, but the remnants are too few to suggest a durable Roman presence.

In the 5th and 6th Centuries C.E., Irish and Welsh monks may have arrived to evangelize Armorica. Saint Sané landed on the beach of the Perzel and then, with 50 followers, moved a few miles inland to establish the parish of Plouzané. (The Breton sculptor Yann Larc'hantec or Yann Larhantec (1829-1913) created a statue of Saint Sané for Plouzané's fountain.)

=== Middle Ages ===
A document dated 8 March 1474 C.E. suggests that there was already a castle on the site by the 15th Century C.E. During this century, title to the site passed from the Viscount of Léon to the Duke of Brittany. This suggests that the castle was built at the beginning of the 14th century before the war of the Breton Succession (1344-1364). In January 1366, John V, Duke of Brittany (1364-1399), transferred the custody of Brest and its defenses to Edward III of England; John did not retrieve Brest until 1397.

It was during the period of English custody, that the island and castle received the name of Bertem or Bertheaume, after Saint Bertem, or Saint Bertellin, commonly called Berteaume.

=== Renaissance ===
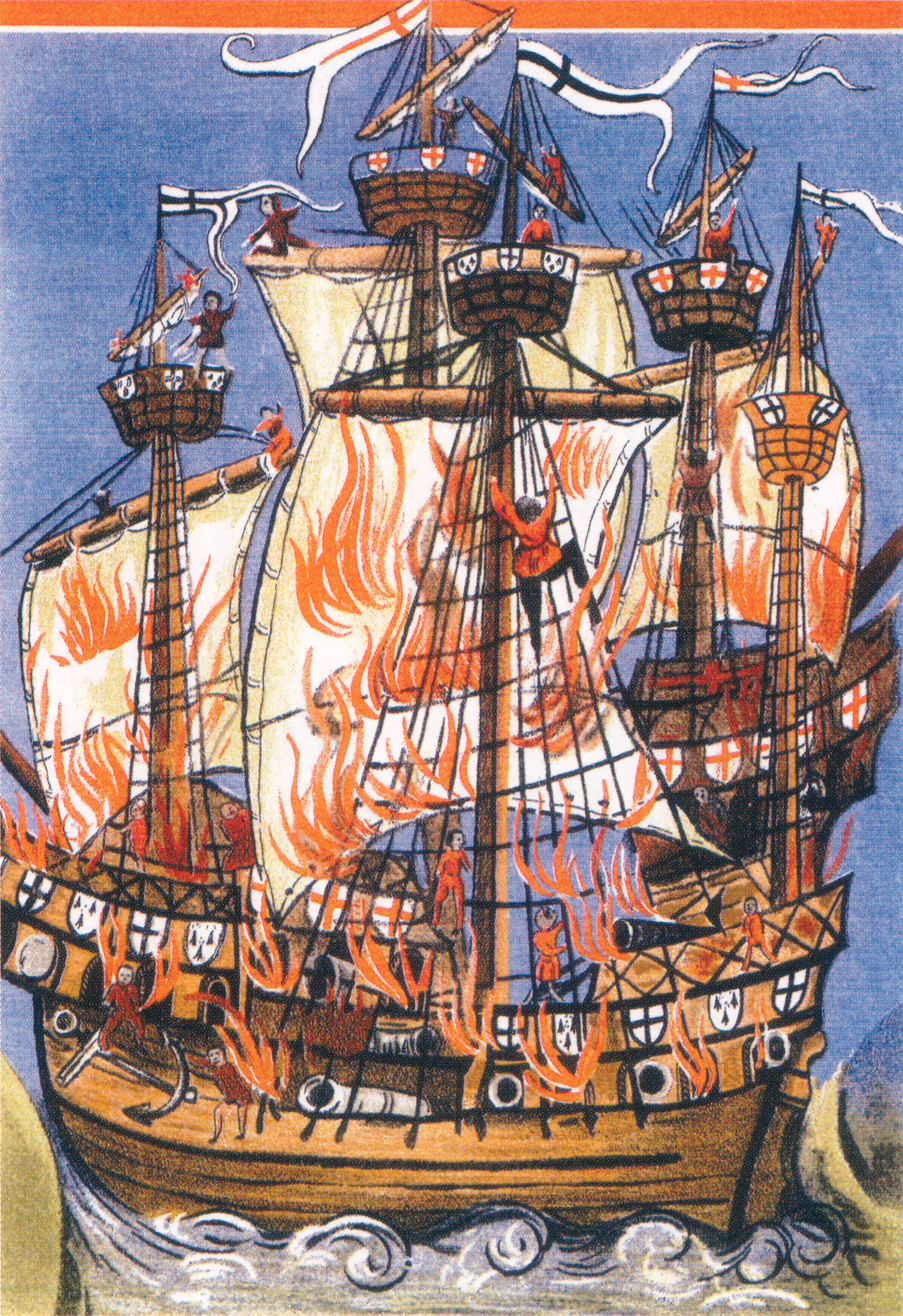
A contemporary image of the Cordeliere (bearing the Flag of Brittany) and Regent (with the Flag of England) on fire. Illustration to the poem Chordigerae navis conflagratio by Germain de Brie.

On 10 August 1512, the garrison at Fort de Bertheaume would have observed the naval Battle of St. Mathieu during which Cordelière, under the command of Hervé de Portzmoguer, and Regent, flagship of English admiral Sir Thomas Knyvett, were both lost with heavy loss of life. The English were boarding Cordelière when her powder magazine blew up. Knyvett and Hervé both perished, along with more than 1,700 men, both French and English.

In the morning of 29 July 1558, an Anglo-Dutch force of 100 vessels landed 7000 men on the Blancs Sablons (White Sands; 48°22′10″N 4°45′52″W). The force then moved around the headlands, destroying and looting as they went. They burned all but eight of 400 houses in Le Conquet, looted and then burned the Abbey of Saint-Mathieu, burned 220 houses at Plougonvelin, and finally destroyed the castle at Bertheaume. Originally charged with capturing Brest, this was all the expeditionary force accomplished before Guillaume de Châtel gathered a force of 10,000 men and forced them to re-embark. The French were able to capture a party of Flammands who had wandered out of gunshot of their ships.

On 14 October 1585, François, son of Olivier Kerannou de Kervasdoué, captain of the castle of Bertheaume, was baptised.

=== Fortification by Vauban ===
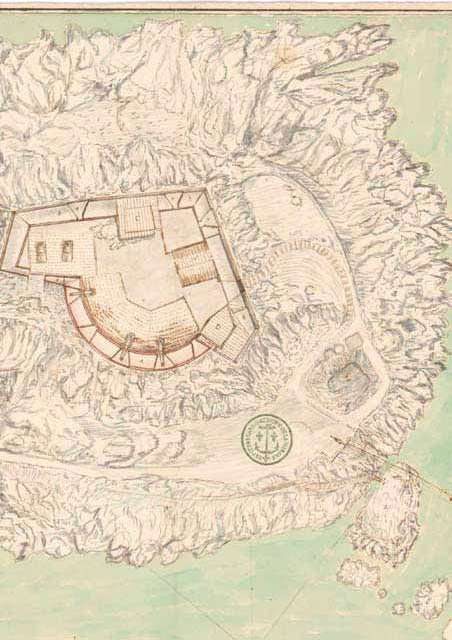
Plan of Fort de Bertheaume at the end of the 17th Century

In 1677, the French engineer Sainte Colombe proposed to Louis XIV of France "to install cannons on the small island of Bertheaume near the port of Trehire on the ruins of the castle of the former Dukes of Brittany".

Vauban, attempting to enhance the defense of Brest, established a battery in 1689 to repel potential English attack. The battery proved its worth during the Anglo-Dutch attack on Camaret-sur-Mer and the Tour Vauban on 17 June 1694. At the time the battery was armed with only three cannons and two mortars. Even so, it was able to fire on the British.

On 28 September 1694 Vauban decided to start building a fort on the site in 1695. However, only in May 1699 did Vauban present plans to build a small fort with a battery on the island that would command the roads of Berteaume and its bay, where vessels waiting for favourable winds to enable them to sail into Brest harbour would anchor. Bertheaume thus is the northern counterpart to the defenses at Camaret-sur-Mer.

Construction of a more elaborate fort began in 1700 under Benoît de Musinot, an artillery officer with the Navy at Brest, and inventor of a swiveling mortar. His plan called for the construction of a bastion and a semi-circular battery, together with a magazine, a barracks, and a powder store.

=== 18th & 19th Centuries ===
In the 18th Century, the Vauban battery received a second, lower battery, located on the east side of the fort. An inspection by auditors in 1793 found the battery in a poor state of repair and generally useless. The defenses on the site came to extend over two islands. The smaller island, which is closest to the mainland, date to the 19th Century. The larger island has batteries for cannons on four levels, with stairs connecting the levels. Posterns gave access to the foot of the walls. At the end of the Napoleonic Wars, the fort was disarmed.

In 1835, the first footbridge connecting the island to the mainland was built.

In the late 19th Century the French military abandoned the fort. Between 1880 and 1890, they replaced it with modern casemates on the mainland. The main battery was armed with two 320mm guns, two 240mm guns, and two 160mm guns. The guns of this battery were able to cover the Goulet all the way to the Crozon peninsula. Two smaller batteries, armed with 95mm quick-firing guns, complemented the main battery. The lower battery had three guns, and the upper battery had four, as well as two heavy 240-mm mortars.

=== First World War ===
As Britain and France were allied during World War I, the fort lost its role in protecting Brest from the Royal Navy. Still, the fort apparently did fire one shot at the beginning of the war. In August 1914, shortly after the start of the war, the fort fired a warning shot to stop a freighter unaware that war had begun. The French army then stripped the fort of its guns, which were shipped to the front. Still, the military retained possession of the fort.

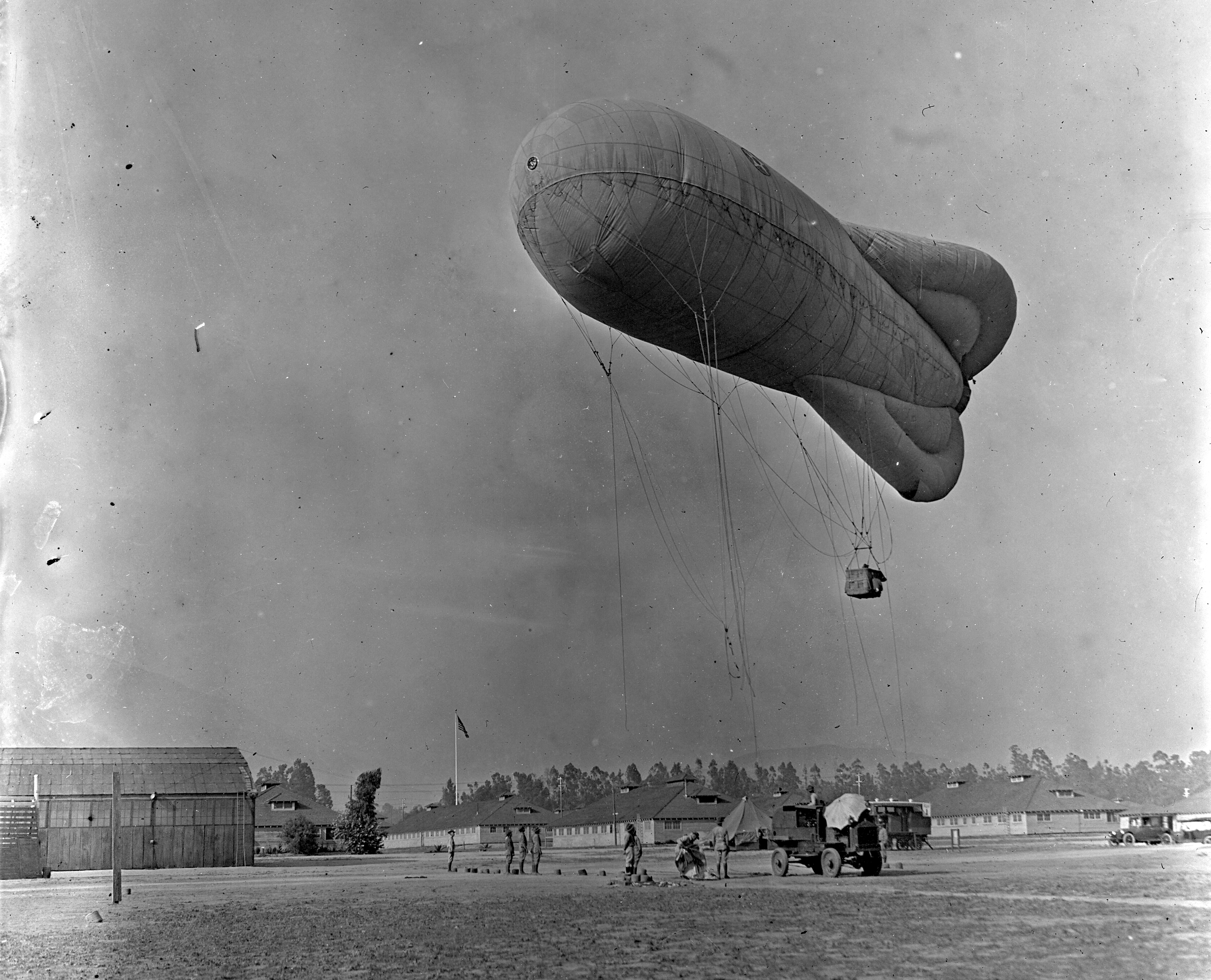
Caquot type dirigible, used by the Allies in the mid-latter part of WWI

Although the fort had lost its guns, it still performed a useful function as a site for captive observation balloons. Observers in the balloons kept watch for German U-boats, especially as convoys started arriving at Brest in 1917 bringing U.S. troops.

After the war, Bertheaume continued for some time to be a training site for crews of captive balloons.

=== Second World War ===
The Germans occupied the site in 1940 and gradually enhanced the defenses, building a small, modern concrete blockhouse on the island. They armed the fort with anti-aircraft guns, 75mm cannon, mortars, and machine guns. The garrison strongly resisted the Liberation, only surrendering on 8 September 1944. Fort de Bertheaume has never again fulfilled a military role.

=== Post-war ===
After the war, the island and the land site came under the purview of the Ministry of Defence, which ignored them for 45 years, abandoning them to the growth of vegetation.

== Rehabilitation of the site ==
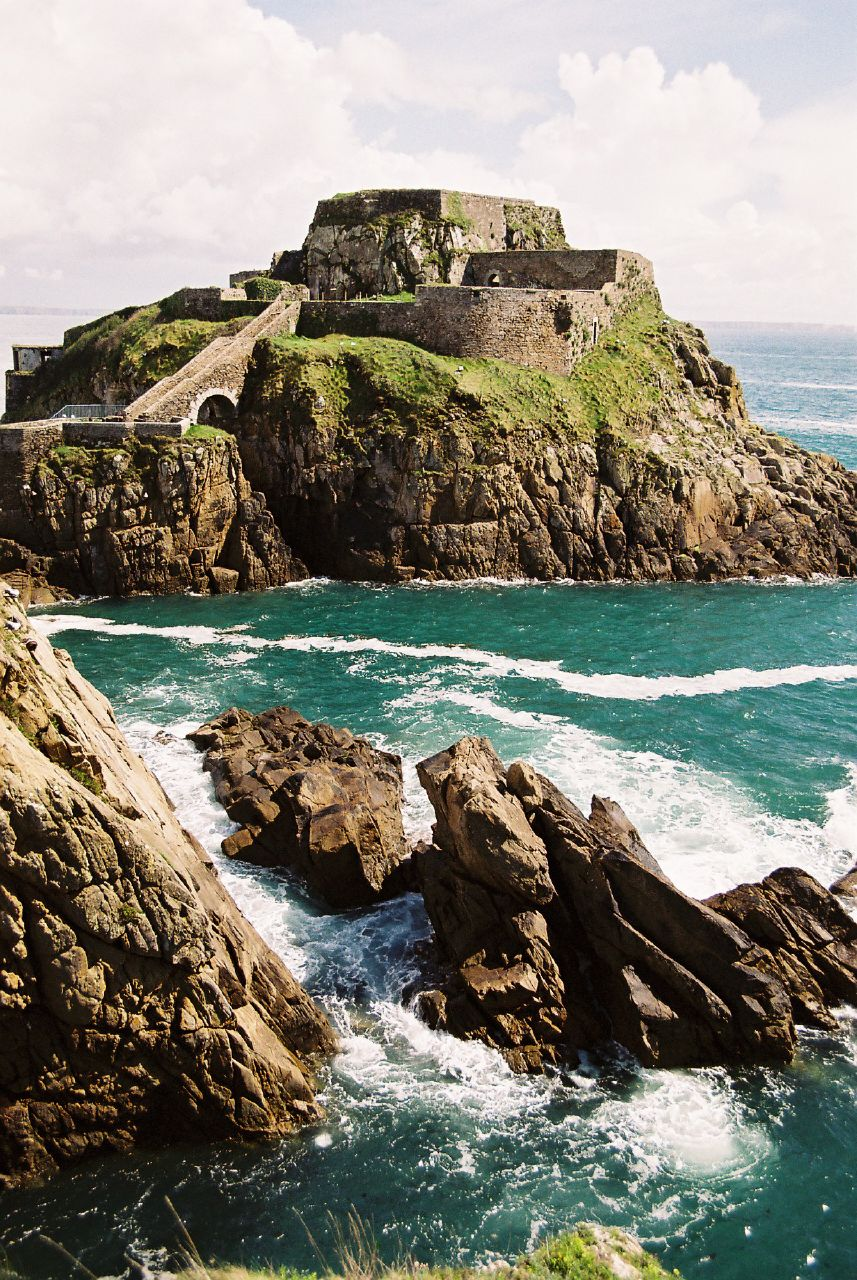
Fort de Bertheaume

In 1992 the commune of Plougonvelin purchased the site for 600,000 Francs (€91,000). However, clearing the site of land mines took some time.

Since then the fort and the surrounding area have been subject to archaeological examination and undergone rehabilitation to make the site visitable. A main issue was that of the footbridge, which had to be rebuilt several times after being damaged on numerous occasions by winter storms. The landward part of the fort now accommodates an open-air theatre.

The lower battery has been converted to an exhibition space, an open-air theatre and restaurant.

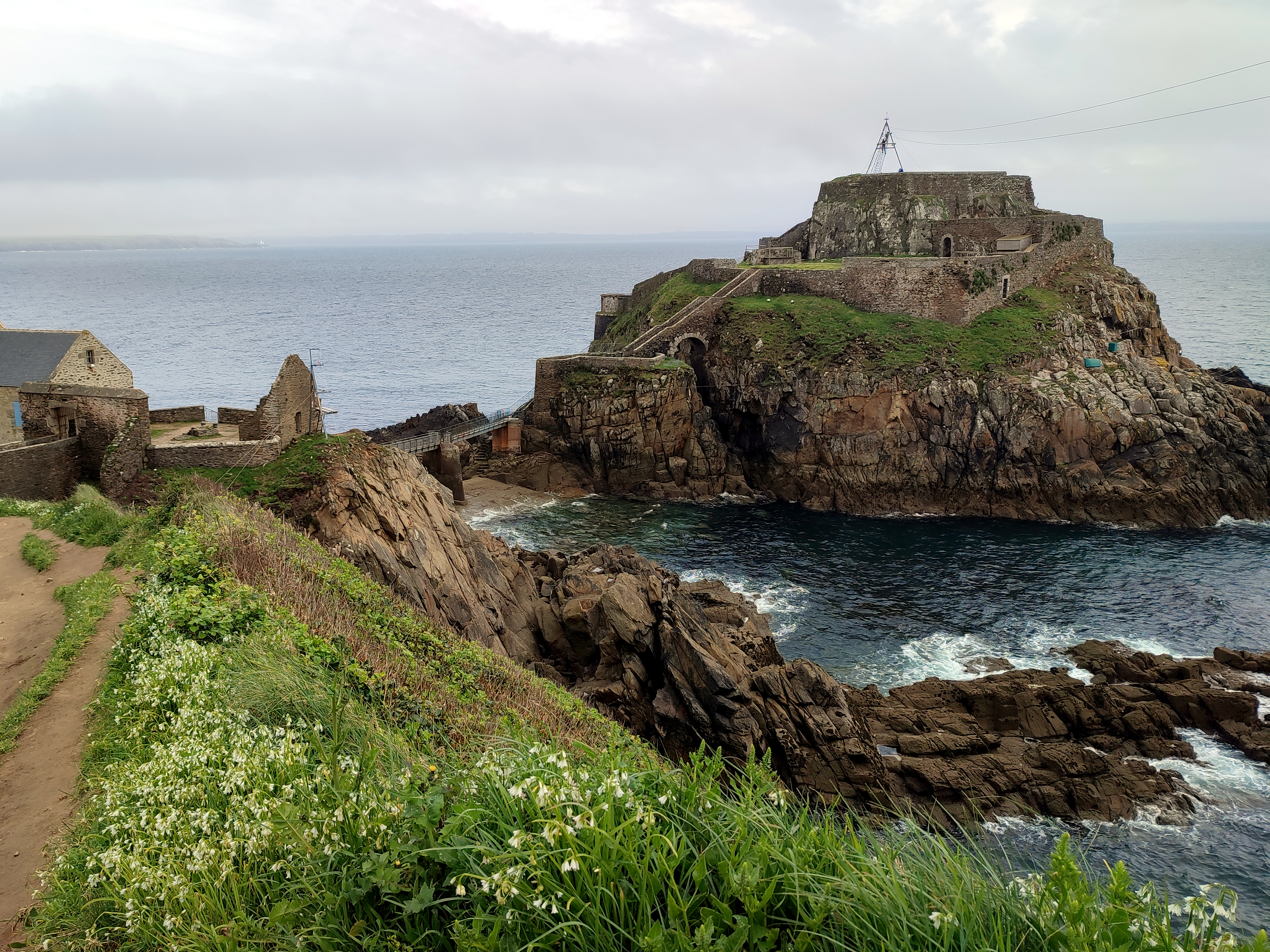

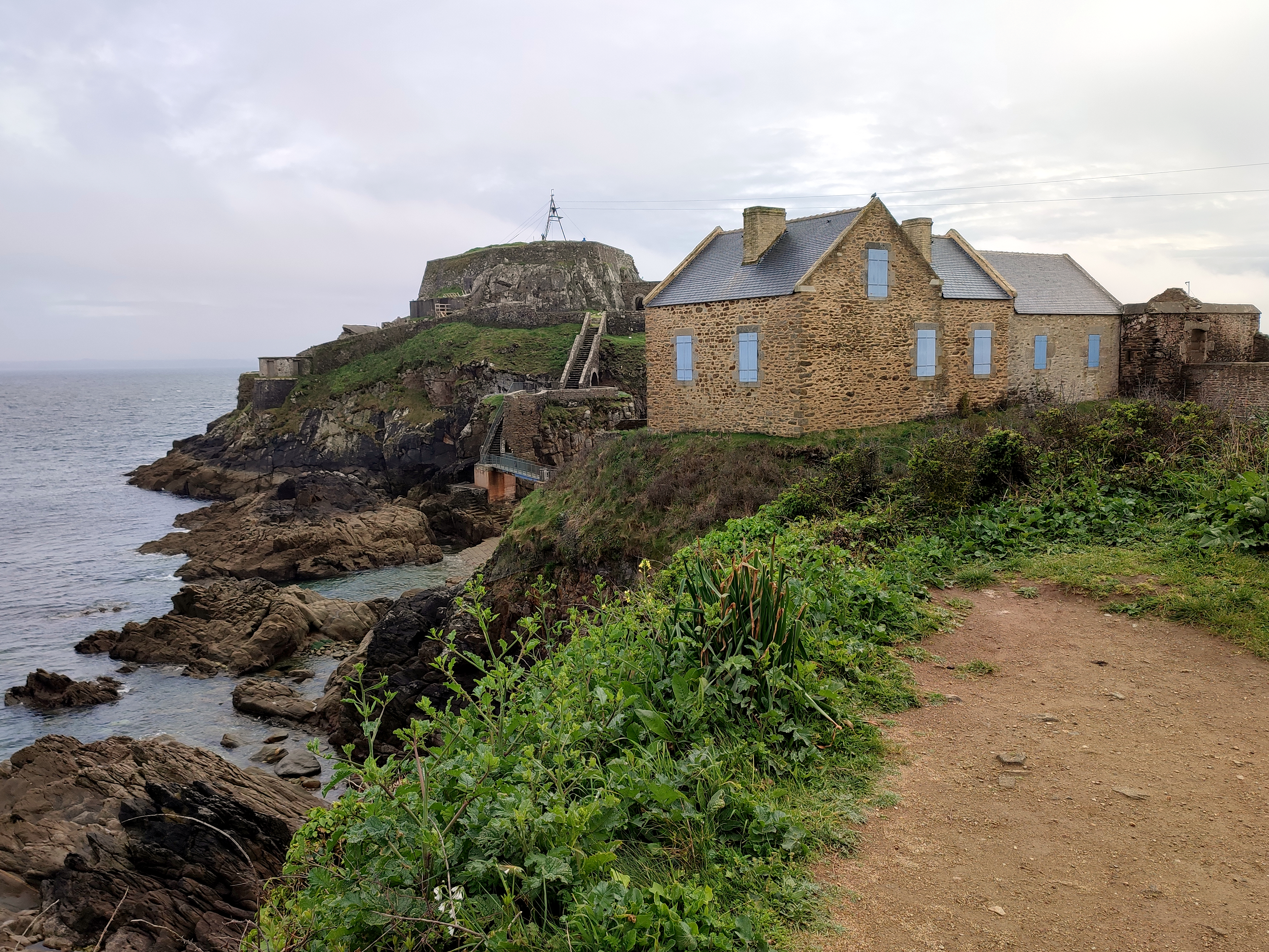
