= Îlot des Capucins =

Coordinates: 48°19′9″N 4°34′59″W

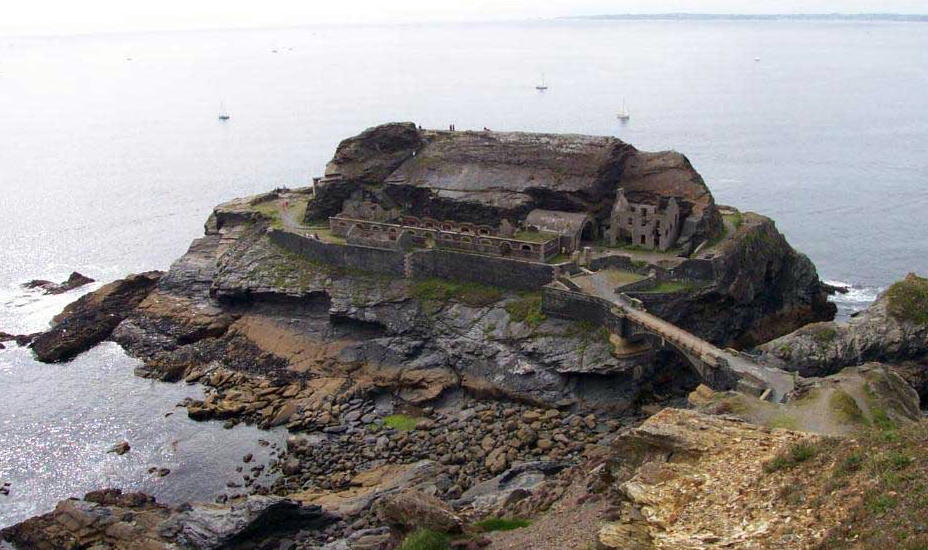
Ilot des Capucins

Îlot des Capucins (Islet of the Capuchins; Breton: Enez ar Gapusined) is a rocky islet at the foot of a cliff in the commune of Roscanvel on the Crozon peninsula. Its name comes from a rock near the island, shaped like a praying monk. It has a strategic position at the entrance to the goulet de Brest and so a fort sited on it controlled the whole of Camaret Bay, with views stretching from pointe du Grand Gouin (to the southwest), to fort de Bertheaume (to the northwest).

The fort was built in 1848 after plans drawn 150 years earlier by Vauban, built in schist and granite and made up of an underground battery (1890) and a rapid-fire battery (1890) It was linked to the mainland by a bridge in 1859.

On the heights overlooking the islet is an upper battery (1885) to the islet's right and left, a platform battery with an underground magazine (1897) and a mortar battery (1889).
