= Fort de Toulbroc'h =

Coordinates: 48°20′28″N 4°37′42″W

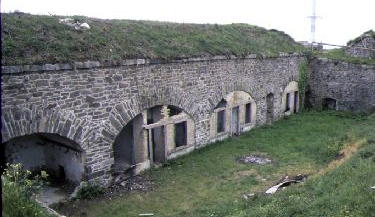
Fort de Toulbroc'h

The military remains known as Fort de Toulbroc'h form part of the defences along the goulet de Brest in France, in the commune of Locmaria-Plouzané. They are accessible via coastal path GR34 to the pointe du Grand Minou.

The first buildings and batteries on the site date to 1884. They were occupied by the Germans and on 2 September 1944 60 men of the 5th Ranger Battalion took them in 6 minutes, capturing a German garrison of 5 officers and 237 men.
