= Pointe des Espagnols =

Headland in Brest, France

Coordinates: 48°20′29.22″N 4°32′2.23″W

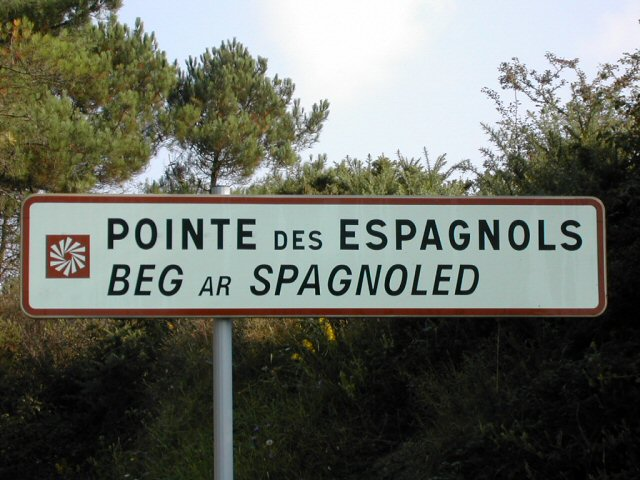
Road-sign

Chart of the Iroise Sea showing the Pointe

The Pointe des Espagnols (Breton: Poent an Espagnol) is the north-east extremity of the Roscanvel peninsula, an outgrowth of the Crozon peninsula closing off the roadstead of Brest. It also marks the south-east limit of the goulet de Brest (the other limits are marked by pointe des Capucins, pointe du Petit Minou and pointe du Portzic).

Formed by a cliff that is more than 60m high, at whose summit and base are the remains of fortifications and barracks, the point reaches towards the north-east via the rocher de la Cormorandière, marked by a pole. The straight channel situated between the point and the rocher is the location for strong currents which affect the roadstead.

This strategic position, facing Brest, was already noted by the Duchy of Brittany, who sited a fortlet there in 1387 (now lost). In 1594, Spaniards landed here and were only dislodged after several battles – it was in this period that the cape first took on its present name.

== Fortifications ==
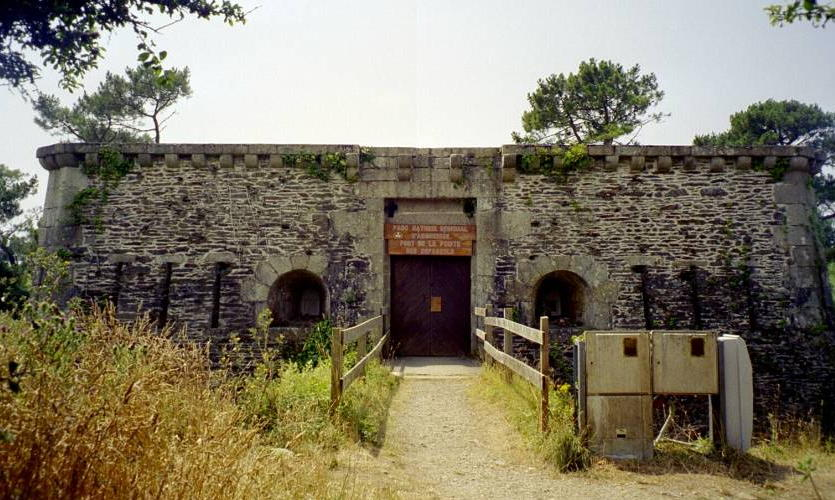
Fort des Espagnols

The known works are:

- Fortlet (fortin) of the Dukes of Brittany (1387) – Disappeared
- Fortin des Espagnols (1594) – Disappeared
- Lower battery (1695) – built to plans by Vauban, on a platform re-using a mine at the bottom of the cliff
- Fort (1749)
- Tour modèle n°1 (1812) – see Tour-modèle type 1811. Battlements destroyed by the Germans
- Underground battery (1888) – embrasures topped by a German blockhouse in 1942
- External battery (1890–1891)
- Magazines and underground battery (1890)
- DCA battery (1942)
