= Toulinquet =

Toulinquet or Toulinguet may refer to:

- Twillingate Islands, the French language name
- Twillingate, Newfoundland and Labrador, the main town on the island
- Georgina Stirling (1866–1935), Canadian opera singer from Twillingate and known by her stage name Marie Toulinquet
- Pointe du Toulinguet, a promontory in Brittany
