= Fort du Dellec =

Coordinates: 48°21′8″N 4°34′5″W

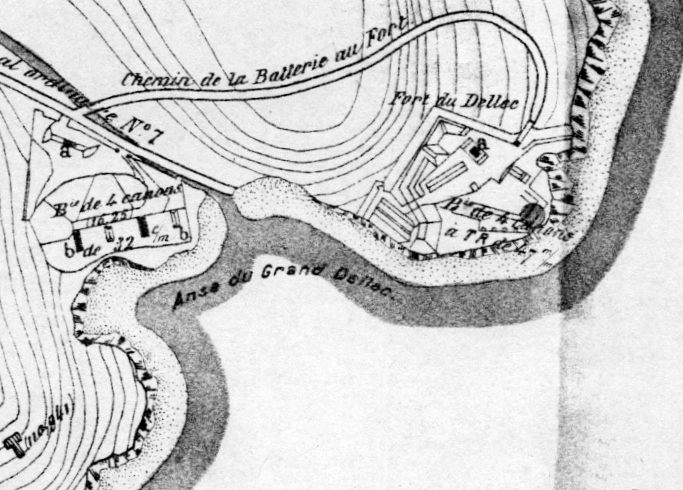
Fort du Dellec (1700 ca)

Forming part of the chain of fortifications along the goulet de Brest, the fort du Dellec was built by Vauban in the 17th century, then rebuilt several times, notably in the 19th century when casemates were added for barracks and munitions storage. A German blockhouse typical of those on the Atlantic Wall was also added here by the Germans. It is located on the coastal paths between Brest and Le Conquet in the commune of Plouzané. The fort has been open to the public for some years.

Two viewing points allow views of the cliffs of the Crozon peninsula and the Goulet, and there is a marina in a nearby small creek.
