= Déolen =

Village in Rajasthan, India

Coordinates: 48°20′52″N 4°38′25″W

Déolen is a small coastal village in the commune of Locmaria-Plouzané in Brittany, France.

Déolen has a popular surfing beach. It is 12 kilometers from Brest and 21 kilometers from the Brest International Airport. It was the landfall of the French transatlantic telegraph cables.
