= Fort du Petit Minou =

Coordinates: 48°20′18″N 4°36′51″W

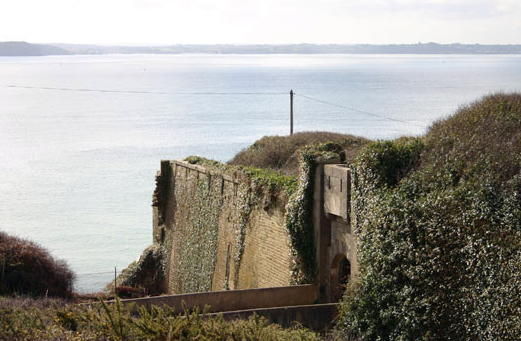
Entrance to the Fort

Built between 1694 and 1697, the Fort du Petit Minou was a fort built in the commune of Plouzané in France to defend the goulet de Brest. It consists of 6 m (20 ft) high masonry bastions, surrounded by a 3 m (9.8 ft) deep and 9.5 m (31 ft) wide moat.

Vauban completed the defences along the goulet and at this fort installed 240-mm cannons and a command post for directing fire and coordinating the defences' magazines. It was reinforced in the 18th and 19th centuries, with the Phare du Petit Minou being added nearby in 1848. The fort was occupied in 1940 as a German blockhouse and after the point's liberation at the start of September 1944 the remains of a former hôtel were demolished. After losing its military purpose, the fort was acquired by the commune and opened to the public in October 2007.
