= Guillaume Balay =

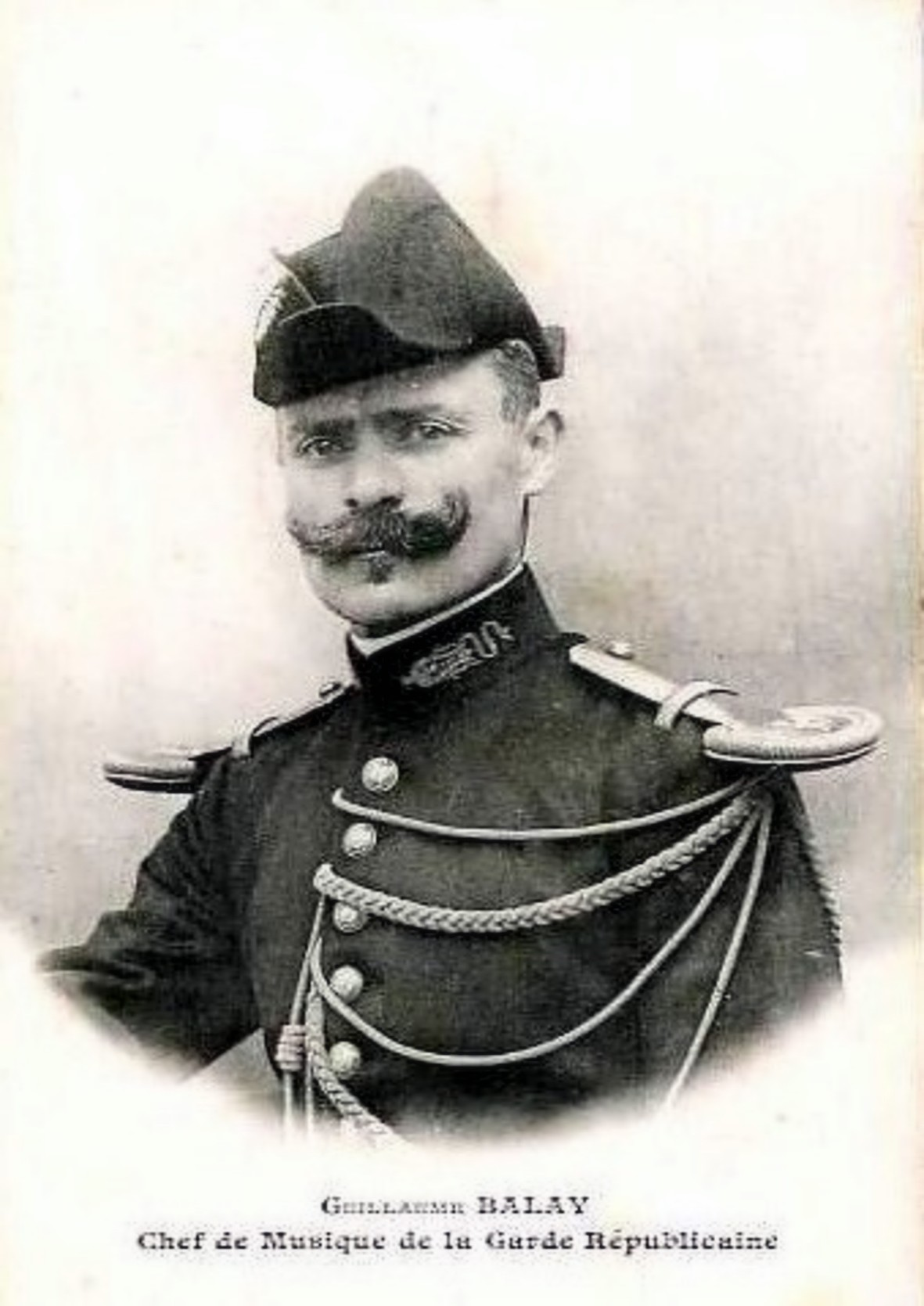
Guillaume Balay

Guillaume Balay, (born April 30, 1871, in Crozon and died December 13, 1943, in Ploujean (now Morlaix), was a French military bandmaster and composer.

== Bio ==
Guillaume Balay was born on April 30, 1871, in Crozon, into a large family. His father, a schoolteacher, introduced him to music.

In 1889, he enlisted in the army, joining the band of the 19th Infantry Regiment in Brest. In 1892, he transferred to the 5th Infantry Regiment in Caen. Guillaume Balay studied cornet at the Paris Conservatory, where in 1894 he unanimously won first prize in the class of Jean-Joseph Mellet. He also studied harmony with Paul Vidal and composition with Vincent d'Indy.

In 1894, he was appointed assistant bandmaster and joined the 119th Infantry Regiment in Courbevoie. In 1898, he was appointed bandmaster. He was assigned to the 154th Infantry Regiment in Bar-le-Duc in 1900, and then in 1904 to the 72nd Infantry Regiment in Amiens, with which he won first prize at the Caen Military Band Competition in July 1908. In 1911, Guillaume Balay won the competition for Bandmaster of the Republican Guard, succeeding Gabriel Parès. He held the position of musical director until his retirement in 1927. Returning to civilian life, he conducted the Fanfare Champenoise de la Marne for several years before retiring to his native Finistère, to Ploujean, where he died on December 13, 1943.

Guillaume Balay transcribed several works by his contemporaries for wind orchestra, including pieces by Florent Schmitt, Claude Debussy, and Maurice Ravel, and orchestrated scores by André Caplet (Douaumont), Camille Saint-Saëns (Marche interalliée), and Gabriel Fauré (Chant funéraire). He also wrote methods for trumpet and cornet, and, as a composer, is the author of chamber music pieces as well as military marches, overtures, and original pieces for wind orchestra.

== Works ==
Among his works are the following:

- Armorique, Breton rhapsody in 4 parts (ed. H. Schoenaers-Millereau, 1914);
- Albert de Belgique, march for wind band and brass band, with optional vocals (ed. H. Schoenaers-Millereau, 1915);
- Au pays lorrain, overture;
- La plainte du clocher (ed. Leduc);
- L'Aurore sur la forêt, piece for wind quintet with principal horn (ed. Buffet-Crampon, 1931);
- La Vallée silencieuse, for wind quintet with principal flute (ed. Leduc);
- A small miniature suite in the 18th-century style, for wind quintet (Leduc edition);
- The Forester's Song, for horn and piano (Leduc edition);
- Echoes of Armor, piece for oboe and piano (Evette and Schaeffer edition, 1923);
- Bells of Arvor, Breton song, for voice and piano, lyrics by the composer (Durand edition, 1934);
- Prelude and Ballad, for cornet (or saxhorn or trumpet) and piano (Leduc edition, 1912);
- Andante and Allegro, for cornet (or saxhorn or trumpet) and piano (1912);
- A small concert piece, for cornet (or saxhorn or trumpet) and piano (competition piece from the Paris Conservatory, 1919), dedicated to the students of Professor Alexandre Petit's class;
- Competition piece, for cornet (or trumpet) and piano, (competition piece from the Paris Conservatory, ed. Leduc, 1913).

== Sources ==
- de Bellaing, Vefa (1992). Dictionnaire des compositeurs de musique en Bretagne (in French). Nantes: Ouest Éditions. ISBN 2-908261-11-1.
- Schmitt, Michel (2002). Dictionnaire des compositeurs francophones pour orchestres à vent (in French). Charnay-lès-Mâcon: Éditions musicales Robert Martin.
