= Plouzané =

Plouzané Plouzane
- Commune
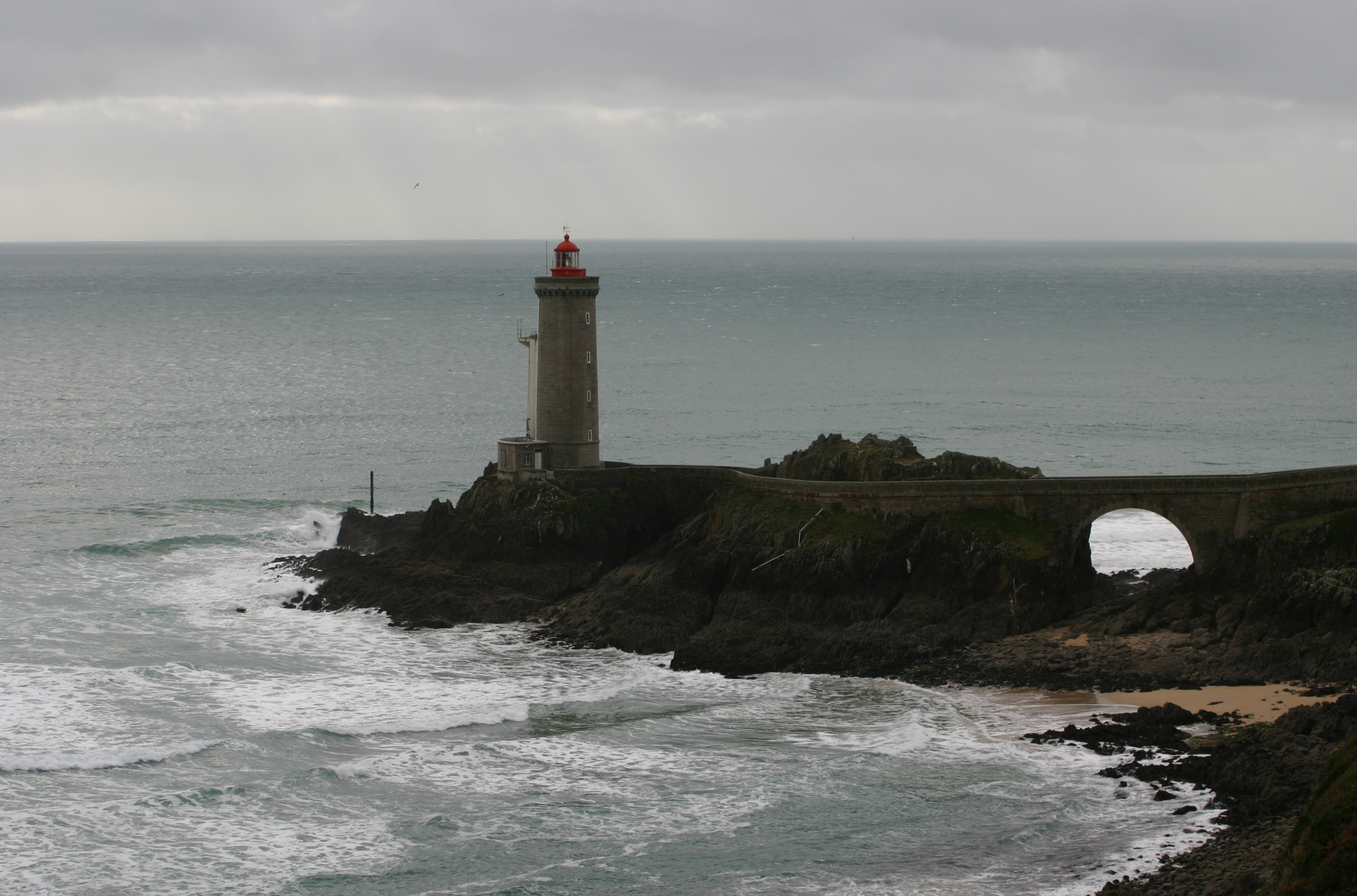
- Petit Minou Lighthouse

- Coat of arms
- Location of Plouzané
- Location within France Location within Brittany
- Coordinates: 48°22′59″N 4°37′08″W
- Country: France
- Region: Brittany
- Department: Finistère
- Arrondissement: Brest
- Canton: Brest-3
- Intercommunality: Brest Métropole

Government
  - Mayor (2020–2026): Yves Du Buit
- Area^{1}: 33.14 km^{2} (12.80 sq mi)
- Highest elevation: 102 m (335 ft)
- Lowest elevation: 0 m (0 ft)
- Population (2023): 13,567
  - Density: 409.4/km^{2} (1,060/sq mi)
- Time zone: UTC+01:00 (CET)
  - Summer (DST): UTC+02:00 (CEST)
- INSEE/Postal code: 29212 /29280
- ^{1} French Land Register data, which excludes lakes, ponds, glaciers > 1 km^{2} (0.386 sq mi or 247 acres) and river estuaries.

Plouzané (Breton: Plouzane) is a commune in the Finistère department of Brittany in north-western France.

== History ==
The shores south of Plouzané are in a strategic location for the defense of the Goulet de Brest strait and were fortified by Sébastien Le Prestre de Vauban. Defensive strongholds include Fort de Bertheaume, Fort du Mengant, and Fort du Dellec.

== Population ==
Inhabitants of Plouzané are called Plouzanéens in French.

Historical population

Year	Pop.	±% p.a.
1793	2,050	—
1800	2,325	+1.81%
1806	2,242	−0.60%
1821	2,175	−0.20%
1831	2,209	+0.16%
1836	2,341	+1.17%
1841	2,353	+0.10%
1846	2,370	+0.14%
1851	2,312	−0.49%
1856	1,977	−3.08%
1861	2,264	+2.75%
1866	2,240	−0.21%
1872	2,229	−0.08%
1876	2,293	+0.71%
1881	2,255	−0.33%
1886	2,326	+0.62%
1891	2,299	−0.23%
1896	2,267	−0.28%
1901	2,424	+1.35%

Year	Pop.	±% p.a.
1906	2,401	−0.19%
1911	2,399	−0.02%
1921	2,132	−1.17%
1926	2,206	+0.68%
1931	2,104	−0.94%
1936	2,166	+0.58%
1946	2,075	−0.43%
1954	2,172	+0.57%
1962	2,026	−0.87%
1968	3,002	+6.77%
1975	5,167	+8.07%
1982	8,845	+7.98%
1990	11,400	+3.22%
1999	12,045	+0.61%
2007	11,745	−0.31%
2012	12,005	+0.44%
2017	12,822	+1.33%
2023	13,567	+0.95%

Source: EHESS and INSEE (1968-2023)

== Breton language ==
In 2008, 4.09% of primary-school children attended Breton/French bilingual schools. The municipality launched a linguistic plan through Ya d'ar brezhoneg on 15 December 2008.

== International relations ==
Plouzané has twinning arrangements with:

- (Republic of Ireland) Kilrush, Ireland
- Pencoed, United Kingdom
- Stelle, Germany
- Ceccano, Italy

== See also ==
- Communes of the Finistère department
- Phare du Petit Minou
