= Pointe du Toulinguet =

Coordinates: 48°16′49″N 4°37′44″W

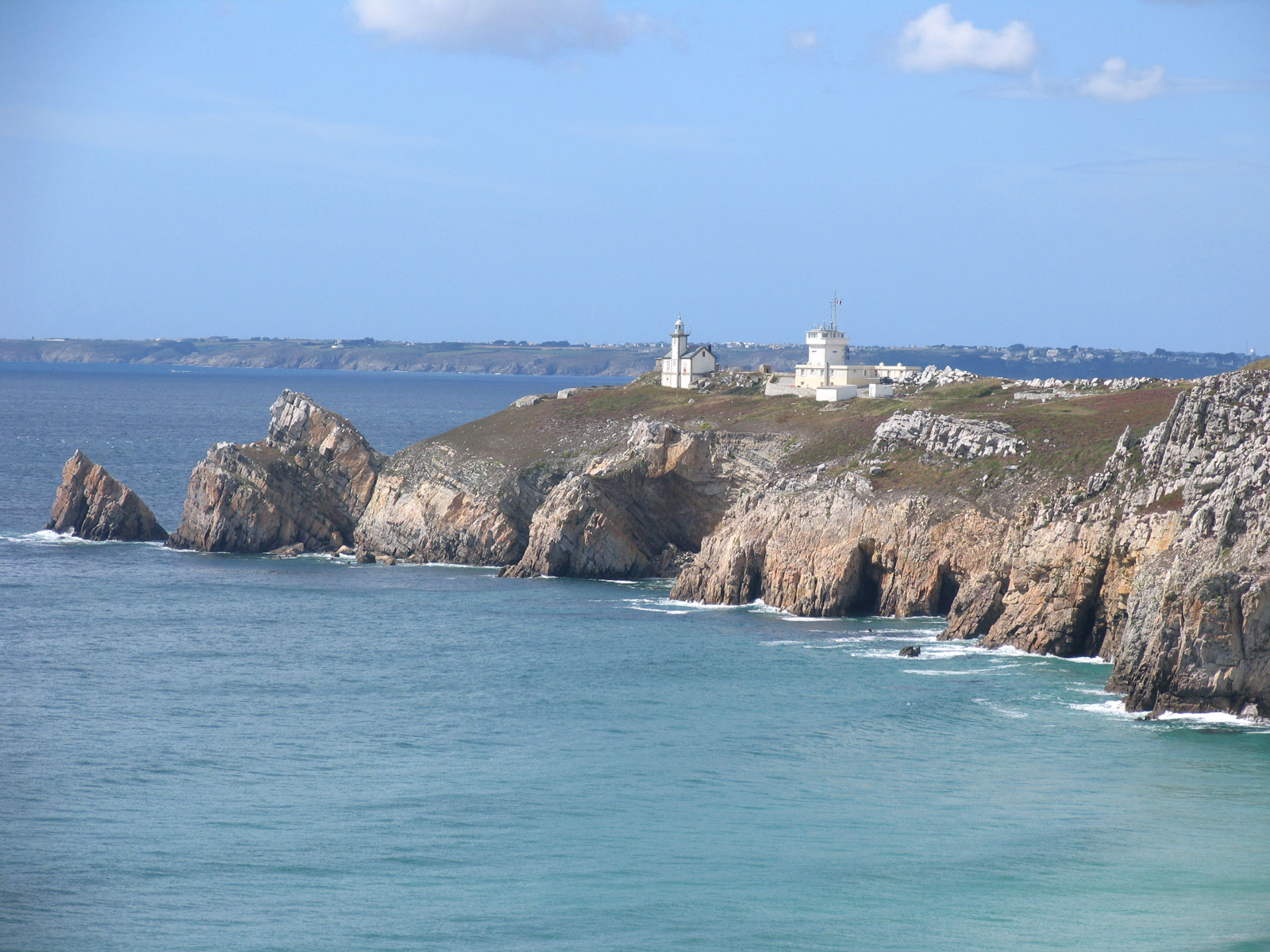
The fort, signal-station, point and lighthouse

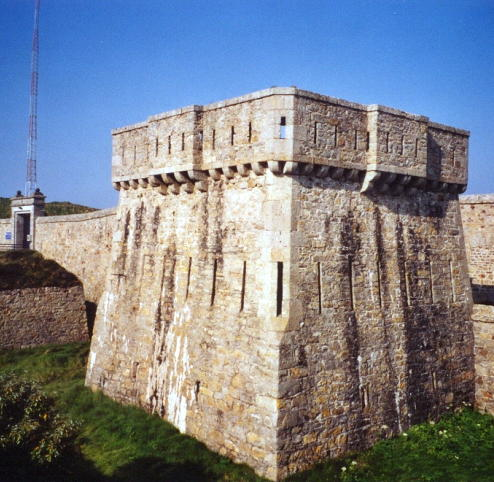
Close-up of the fort

The Pointe du Toulinguet (Breton: beg Touyezheg) is a promontory at the end of the Crozon peninsula in the commune of Camaret-sur-Mer in France, in western Brittany.

Its known fortifications include a prehistoric fortified site, as well as a lower battery by Vauban (of which only the platform remains). It is also the site of a model-tower number 3, with a surrounding wall, 4 batteries built in 1883 and 1899, a 1949 signal station still in use and an 1848 lighthouse. It is still military land and closed to the public.
