= Portzic Lighthouse =

Phare du Portzic Phare du Portzic
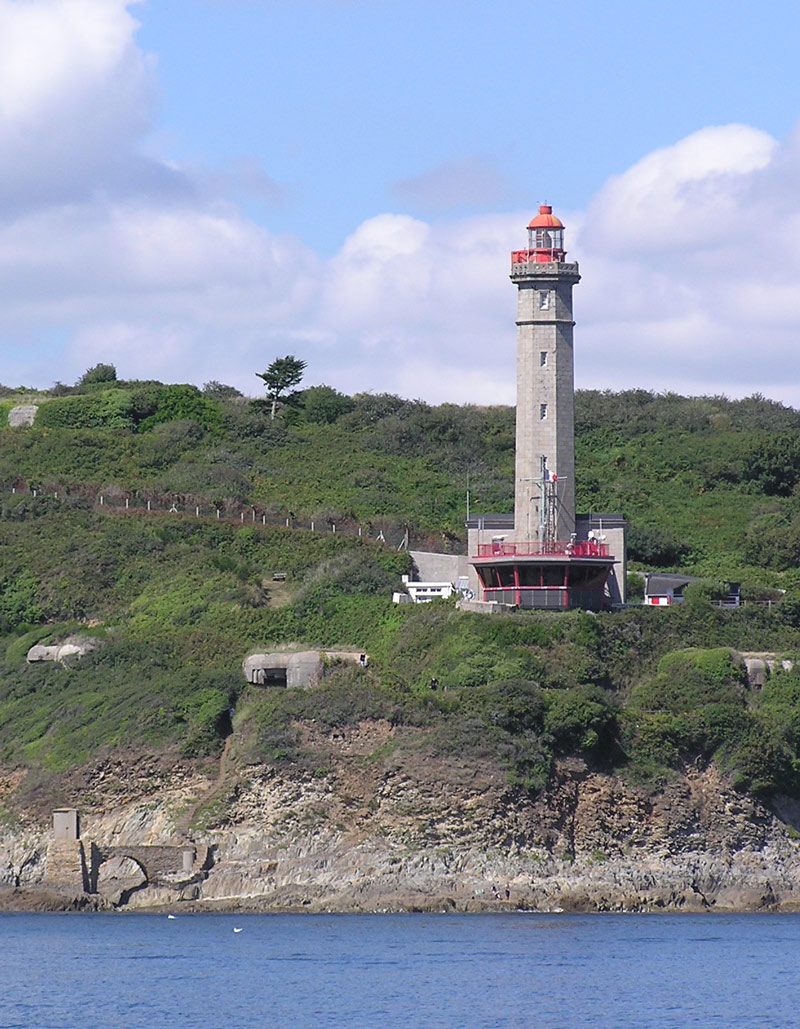
- The lighthouse from the sea in January 2006
- Location: Goulet de Brest, Brest, Finistère, France
- Coordinates: 48°21′30″N 4°32′03″W

Tower
- Constructed: 1848
- Construction: granite (tower)
- Automated: 1994
- Height: 35 m (115 ft)
- Shape: octagon
- Markings: unpainted (tower), red (lantern)
- Power source: mains electricity
- Heritage: listed in the general inventory of cultural heritage

Light
- Focal height: 56 m (184 ft)
- Range: 17 nmi (31 km; 20 mi)
- Characteristic: Oc(2) WR 12s
- France no.: FR-0655

The Portzic Lighthouse (French: phare du Portzic) is situated on the north-eastern extremity of the Goulet de Brest (Finistère, France) and is the nearest lighthouse to the town of Brest. It is a 35 metres (115 ft) tall octagonal tower. On the seaward side of the bottleneck entrance to the goulet, the lighthouse faces the Pointe des Espagnols.

It was built on military land in 1848, at the same time as the phare du Petit Minou (started slightly earlier to the north of the Goulet. It was electrified in 1953 and automated in 1994 (though a semaphore post set up at its base in 1987 to regulate traffic in and out of the goulet is still permanently manned).

== Characteristics ==
- Signals: 1 main light for the sector with 2 flashes every 10 seconds (2 second flash then 6 second flash), accompanied by 2 twinkling directional lights in the direction of the Goulet, one continuous (one flash per second, known as the North signal, indicates to a navigator that he finds himself to the north of the channel), the other with 6 short flashes (one per second) and a long flash, known as the South signal, indicating to the navigator that he finds himself to the south of the channel.

== See also ==
- List of lighthouses in France
- Fort de Portzic
