= Fort du Mengant =

Coordinates: 48°20′50″N 4°35′16″W

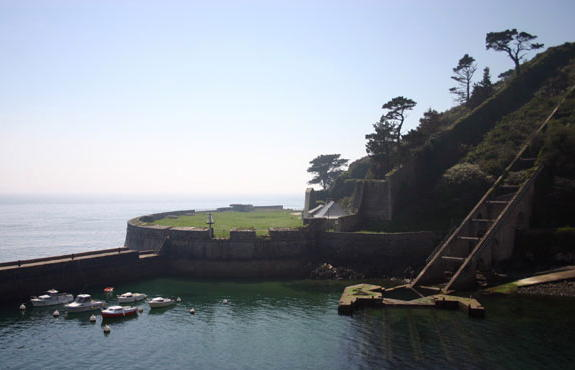
Fort du Mengant

The fort du Mengant or fort du Léon in the commune of Plouzané is part of the defences of the roadstead of Brest. It is made up of a high battery (58m above sea-level), with a now-destroyed artillery tower, and a lower semi-circular battery at the foot of the cliff, with two small powder magazines.

Built by Vauban in 1684, it faces the batterie de cornouaille on the Roscanvel peninsula, built to the same model as the lower part of the fort du Mengant. The aim was to permit these two batteries, only just over 2 km apart, to bar entry to the roadstead. The original plans foresaw the completion of the defences by adding a battery in the middle of the goulet, on the Roche Mengant, but this proved impossible due to the tides and currents in the goulet.

Around 1875, the naval ministry built a dam up against the lower battery to create a small harbour in which to base motor torpedo boats, in order to adapt the fort to this evolution in warfare. The lower battery houses the annexe to the Centre Nautique des Equipages de la Marine, whilst the upper battery is now used for radar testing. An imposing ramp was built in the 1960s to link the port to the upper battery so that the largest pieces of radar equipment to be tested could be carried up to it from the port.
