= Locmaria-Plouzané =

Locmaria-Plouzané Lokmaria-Plouzane
- Commune
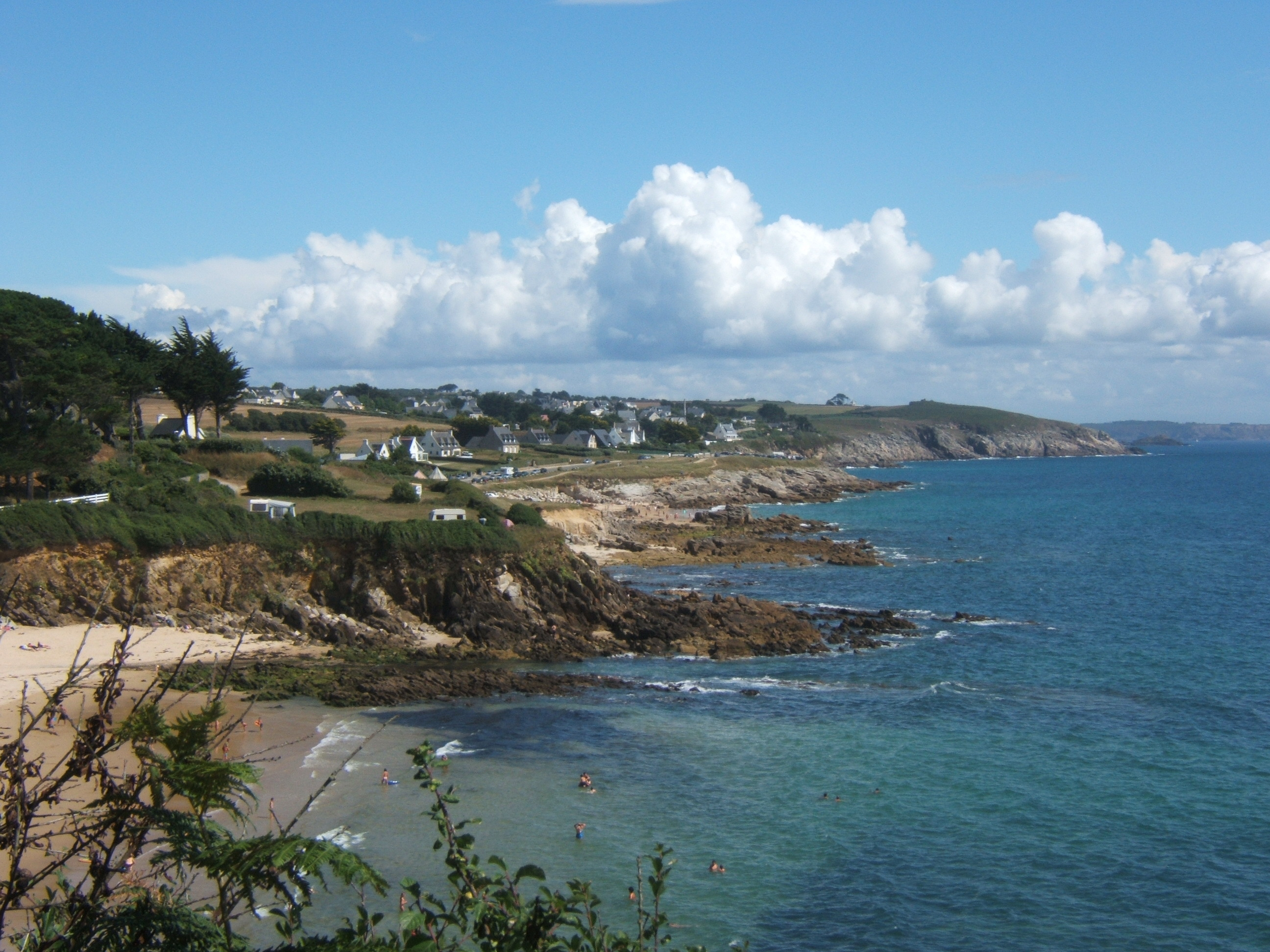
- Porsmilin Beach, at Locmaria-Plouzané

- Coat of arms
- Location of Locmaria-Plouzané
- Location within France Location within Brittany
- Coordinates: 48°22′33″N 4°38′31″W
- Country: France
- Region: Brittany
- Department: Finistère
- Arrondissement: Brest
- Canton: Saint-Renan
- Intercommunality: Pays d'Iroise

Government
  - Mayor (2020–2026): Viviane Godebert
- Area^{1}: 23.16 km^{2} (8.94 sq mi)
- Highest elevation: 107 m (351 ft)
- Lowest elevation: 0 m (0 ft)
- Population (2023): 5,130
  - Density: 222/km^{2} (574/sq mi)
- Time zone: UTC+01:00 (CET)
  - Summer (DST): UTC+02:00 (CEST)
- INSEE/Postal code: 29130 /29280
- ^{1} French Land Register data, which excludes lakes, ponds, glaciers > 1 km^{2} (0.386 sq mi or 247 acres) and river estuaries.

Locmaria-Plouzané (French pronunciation: [lɔkmaʁja pluzane]; Breton: Lokmaria-Plouzane) is a commune in the Finistère department of Brittany in north-western France.

== Population ==
Inhabitants of Locmaria-Plouzané are called in French Lanvénécois.

Historical population
Year	Pop.	±% p.a.
1968	2,971	—
1975	3,280	+1.42%
1982	3,726	+1.84%
1990	4,150	+1.36%
1999	4,252	+0.27%
2007	4,657	+1.14%
2012	4,985	+1.37%
2017	5,083	+0.39%
2023	5,130	+0.15%
Source: INSEE

== Breton language ==
The municipality launched a linguistic plan concerning the Breton language through Ya d'ar brezhoneg on 20 June 2008.

== See also ==
- Communes of the Finistère department
