= Quélern =

Coordinates: 48°17′58″N 4°33′37″W

Quélern (French pronunciation: [kelɛʁn]) is a hamlet in Roscanvel, in the department of Finistère (Brittany), in western France.

== Fortifications ==
=== Fortified lines ===
The Quélern lines defended the entrance to the goulet de Brest against capture from behind the defences of the Roscanvel peninsula. They are 1.22 km long and form the only surviving non-urban line of fortifications in France. Work on them was begun in 1695 by Vauban himself (they are still sometimes known as the Vauban system) and they were improved from 1777 to 1785 due to the American Revolutionary War, in expectation of British action against the port of Brest. The lines still serve a strong geostrategic function and the area is still military land with no public access. An upper gate known as porte de Camaret and a lower gate known as porte de Crozon were the only two ways through the wall until their destruction, possibly between 1940 and 1944.

=== Redoubt ===
From 1852 to 1854, a fort known as the réduit de Quélern was built to plans by Vauban, with modifications. It is a square-plan fort with bastions and surrounded by a dry moat. Like the lines, it is still Ministry of Defence property and thus not open to the public.
