= Petit Minou Lighthouse =

Lighthouse in Finistère, France

Petit Minou Lighthouse Phare du Petit Minou
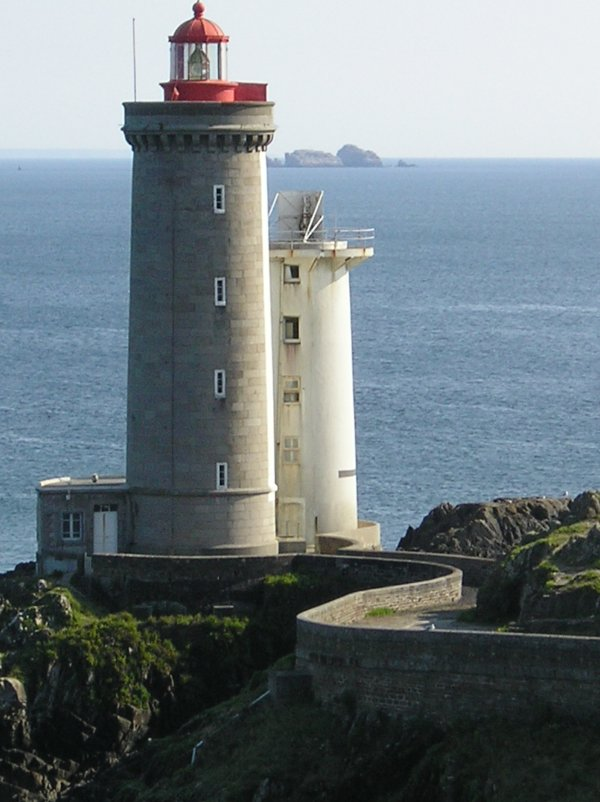
- The lighthouse in July 2004
- Location: Goulet de Brest, Finistère, France
- Coordinates: 48.336667°N 4.614167°W

Tower
- Constructed: 1848
- Construction: granite tower
- Automated: 1989
- Height: 22 metres (72 ft)
- Shape: cylindrical tower with balcony and lantern
- Markings: white tower the seaward side, red lantern
- Heritage: listed in the general inventory of cultural heritage,

Light
- Focal height: 32 metres (105 ft)
- Range: 19 nmi (35 km)
- Characteristic: Fl (2) W R 6s.
- France no.: FR-0652

The Petit Minou Lighthouse (Phare du Petit Minou) is a lighthouse in the roadstead of Brest, standing in front of the Fort du Petit Minou, in the commune of Plouzané. By aligning it with the Phare du Portzic, it shows the safe route to follow for ships to enter the roadstead. It also has a red signal that indicates a dangerous sector around the plateau of les Fillettes (literally "the girls"), one of the submerged rocks in the Goulet de Brest.

The Fort du Petit Minou was built between 1694 and 1697 to defend the Goulet de Brest, as part of a major fortification campaign of France under the direction of the Marquis de Vauban. Two hundred and forty cannons and a formidable moat helped protect a waterway leading to the military port town of Brest. The lighthouse was added in front of the fort in 1848 to aid navigation through the strait.

== See also ==
- List of lighthouses in France
