= Crozon =

Crozon Kraozon
- Commune
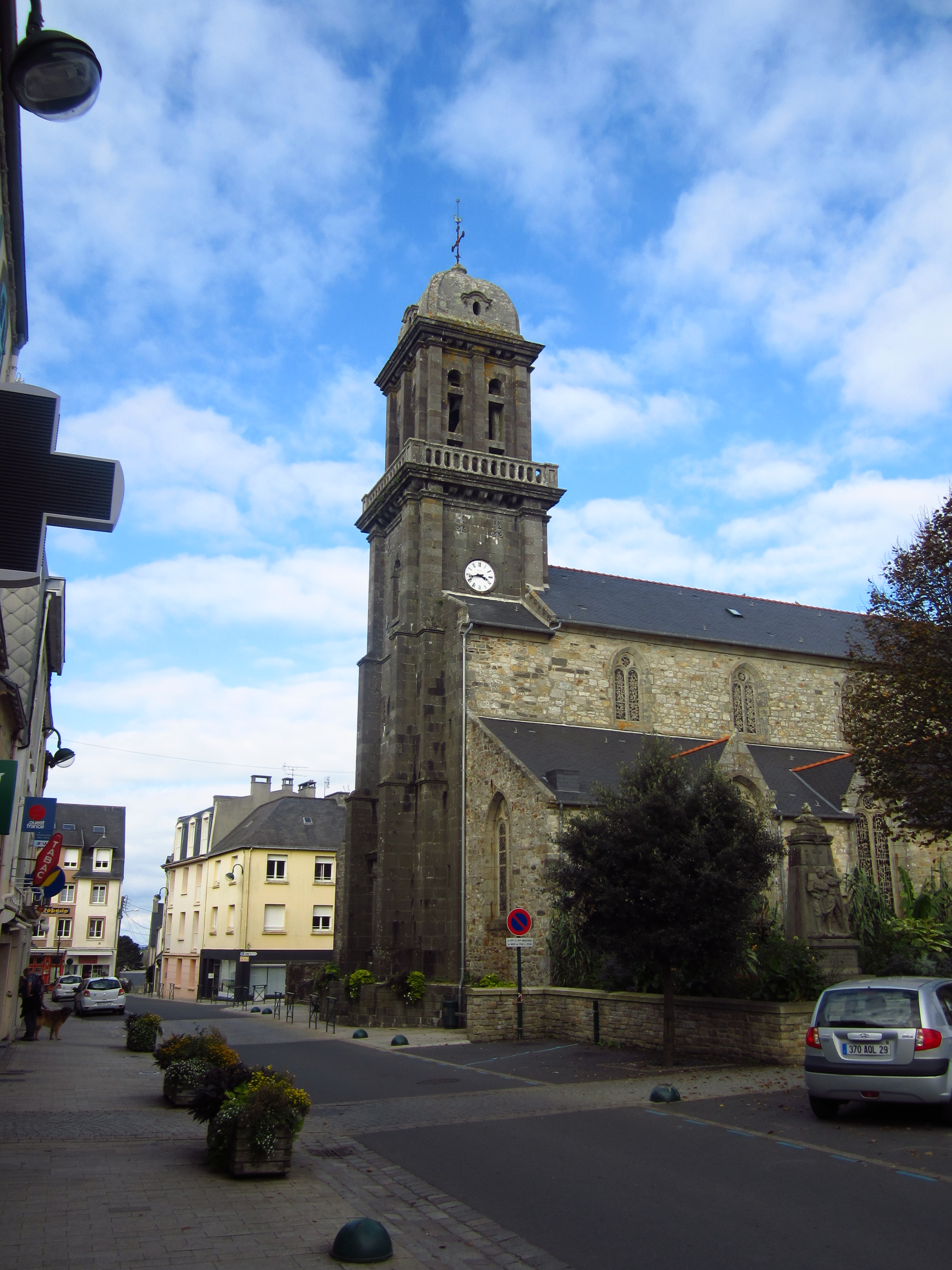
- The church of Saint-Pierre, in Crozon

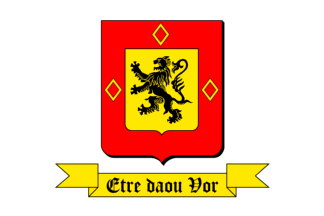
- Flag Coat of arms
- Location of Crozon
- Location within France Location within Brittany
- Coordinates: 48°14′45″N 4°29′15″W
- Country: France
- Region: Brittany
- Department: Finistère
- Arrondissement: Châteaulin
- Canton: Crozon
- Intercommunality: Presqu'île de Crozon-Aulne maritime

Government
  - Mayor (2020–2026): Patrick Berthelot
- Area^{1}: 80.37 km^{2} (31.03 sq mi)
- Elevation: 85 m (279 ft)
- Highest elevation: 102 m (335 ft)
- Lowest elevation: 0 m (0 ft)
- Population (2023): 7,499
  - Density: 93.31/km^{2} (241.7/sq mi)
- Time zone: UTC+01:00 (CET)
  - Summer (DST): UTC+02:00 (CEST)
- INSEE/Postal code: 29042 /29160
- ^{1} French Land Register data, which excludes lakes, ponds, glaciers > 1 km^{2} (0.386 sq mi or 247 acres) and river estuaries.

Crozon (French pronunciation: [kʁɔzɔ̃], [kʁozɔ̃]; Breton: Kraozon [ˈkrɔːzõn], locally [ˈkraõn]) is a commune in the department of Finistère and the administrative region of Brittany, northwestern France. Besides the town of Crozon, the village of Morgat is part of the commune.

Crozon is located on the Crozon Peninsula on the west coast of Finistère. It is bordered by the communes of Camaret-sur-Mer to the west, Roscanvel to the northwest, Lanvéoc to the north, Landévennec to the north-east and Telgruc-sur-Mer to the east. Crozon is the chef-lieu of the arrondissement of Châteaulin. Louis Jouvet, a French actor, was born in Crozon in 1887.

Crozon harbours Île Longue, the base of the French strategic nuclear submarines.

== Tourism ==
In common with many other French towns, Crozon has a number of fêtes and festivals at various times of year. Probably the best known festival held in Crozon is the Festival du Bout du Monde ("World's End Festival"), a live music festival held on the first weekend in August.

Crozon has various shops and a couple of supermarkets for daily needs. There is also a local produce market most mornings in front of the church. A bigger market called 'la Foire' takes place every first Wednesday of the month.

== Population ==
Inhabitants of Crozon are called in French Crozonnais.

Historical population

Year	Pop.	±% p.a.
1793	6,200	—
1800	6,492	+0.66%
1806	6,664	+0.44%
1821	6,393	−0.28%
1831	8,034	+2.31%
1836	8,209	+0.43%
1841	8,858	+1.53%
1846	8,576	−0.64%
1851	8,815	+0.55%
1856	8,489	−0.75%
1861	8,651	+0.38%
1866	8,946	+0.67%
1872	8,929	−0.03%
1876	7,763	−3.44%
1881	8,223	+1.16%
1886	8,585	+0.87%
1891	8,276	−0.73%
1896	8,340	+0.15%
1901	8,625	+0.67%

Year	Pop.	±% p.a.
1906	8,780	+0.36%
1911	8,323	−1.06%
1921	7,715	−0.76%
1926	7,454	−0.69%
1931	7,206	−0.67%
1936	7,015	−0.54%
1946	7,712	+0.95%
1954	7,032	−1.15%
1962	6,741	−0.53%
1968	6,895	+0.38%
1975	7,297	+0.81%
1982	7,525	+0.44%
1990	7,705	+0.30%
1999	7,535	−0.25%
2007	7,682	+0.24%
2012	7,692	+0.03%
2017	7,477	−0.57%
2023	7,499	+0.05%

Source: EHESS and INSEE (1968-2023)

== Breton language ==
In 2008, 4.58% of primary-school children attended bilingual schools, where Breton language is taught alongside French.

== International relations ==
Crozon is twinned with the following places:

- Sligo, Ireland
- Ulm, Germany
- Pralognan-la-Vanoise, France

== See also ==
- Communes of the Finistère department
- Parc naturel régional d'Armorique
- Guillaume Balay
