= Camaret-sur-Mer =

Camaret-sur-Mer Kameled
- Commune
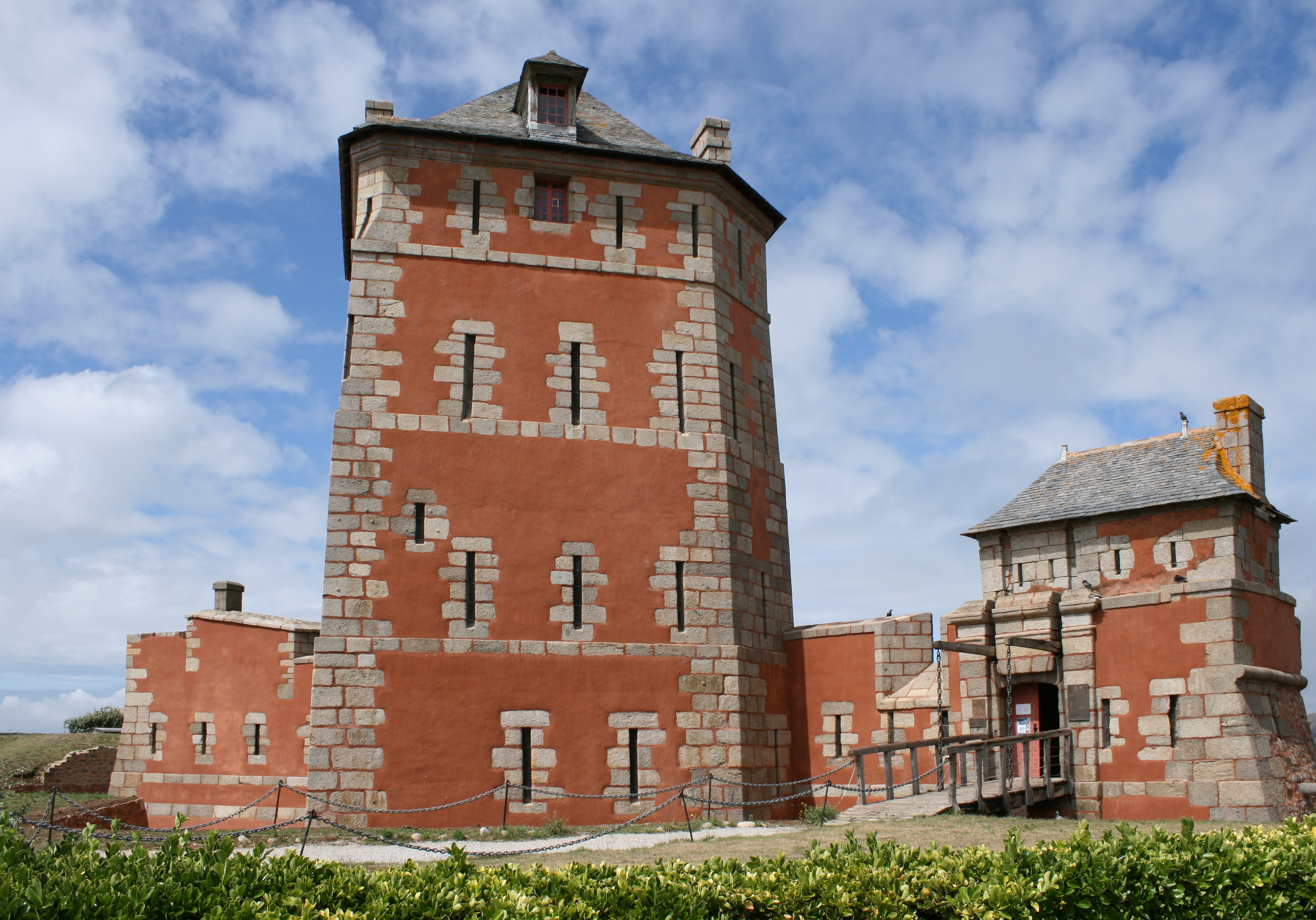
- Vauban's fortifications

- Coat of arms
- Location of Camaret-sur-Mer
- Location within France Location within Brittany
- Coordinates: 48°16′36″N 4°35′44″W
- Country: France
- Region: Brittany
- Department: Finistère
- Arrondissement: Châteaulin
- Canton: Crozon
- Intercommunality: Presqu'île de Crozon-Aulne maritime

Government
  - Mayor (2020–2026): Joseph Le Mérour
- Area^{1}: 11.64 km^{2} (4.49 sq mi)
- Highest elevation: 65 m (213 ft)
- Lowest elevation: 0 m (0 ft)
- Population (2023): 2,494
  - Density: 214.3/km^{2} (554.9/sq mi)
- Time zone: UTC+01:00 (CET)
  - Summer (DST): UTC+02:00 (CEST)
- INSEE/Postal code: 29022 /29570
- ^{1} French Land Register data, which excludes lakes, ponds, glaciers > 1 km^{2} (0.386 sq mi or 247 acres) and river estuaries.

Camaret-sur-Mer (French pronunciation: [kamaʁε syʁ mɛʁ]; Breton: Kameled) is a commune in the Finistère department in northwestern France, located at the end of Crozon peninsula.

== Sights ==
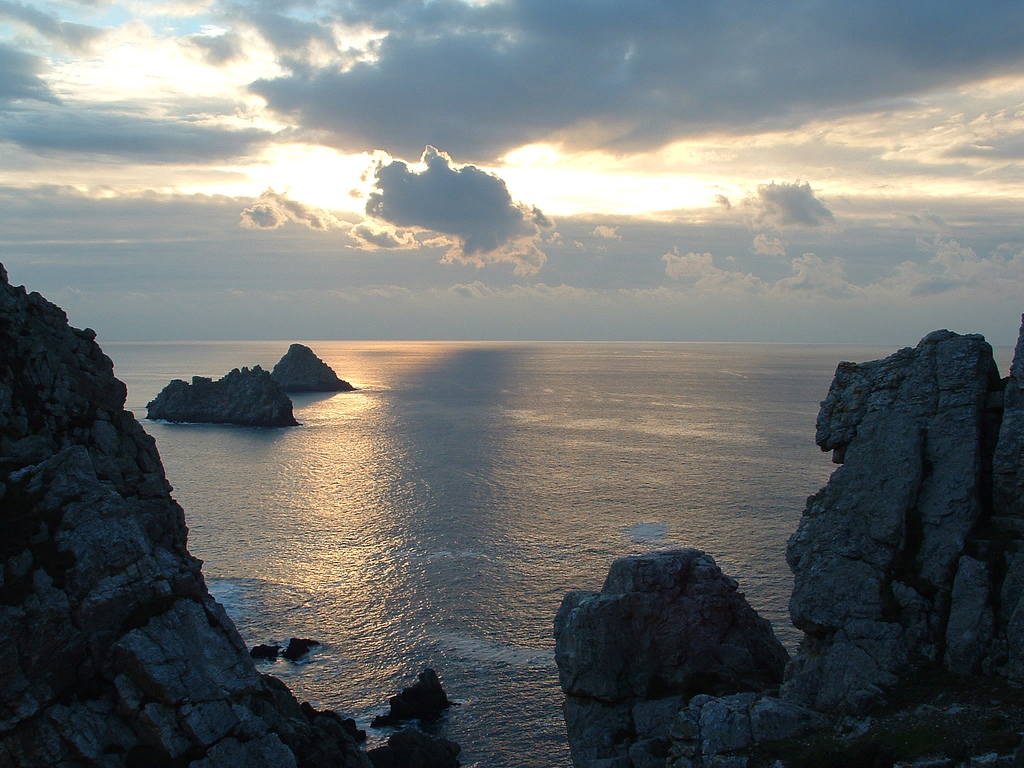
Les Tas de Pois

Camaret-sur-Mer is home to the Tour Vauban or Tour dorée (lit. "Golden Tower"), a historic fortification guarding the harbor and built in 1669–94. In 2008, the Tour dorée was listed as a UNESCO World Heritage Site, as part of the "Fortifications of Vauban" group.

Camaret also is home to a marina and some beaches.

== Population ==
Inhabitants of Camaret-sur-Mer are called Camarétois.

Historical population

Year	Pop.	±% p.a.
1793	685	—
1800	687	+0.04%
1806	723	+0.85%
1821	873	+1.26%
1831	1,003	+1.40%
1836	1,040	+0.73%
1841	1,181	+2.58%
1846	1,136	−0.77%
1851	1,163	+0.47%
1856	1,153	−0.17%
1861	1,233	+1.35%
1866	1,258	+0.40%
1872	1,374	+1.48%
1876	1,632	+4.40%
1881	1,933	+3.44%
1886	1,950	+0.18%
1891	2,003	+0.54%
1896	1,978	−0.25%
1901	2,201	+2.16%

Year	Pop.	±% p.a.
1906	2,429	+1.99%
1911	3,257	+6.04%
1921	3,291	+0.10%
1926	3,528	+1.40%
1931	3,528	+0.00%
1936	3,644	+0.65%
1946	3,469	−0.49%
1954	3,435	−0.12%
1962	3,649	+0.76%
1968	3,593	−0.26%
1975	3,272	−1.33%
1982	3,047	−1.01%
1990	2,933	−0.48%
1999	2,668	−1.05%
2007	2,614	−0.26%
2012	2,602	−0.09%
2017	2,543	−0.46%
2023	2,494	−0.32%

Source: EHESS and INSEE (1968-2023)

== Map ==
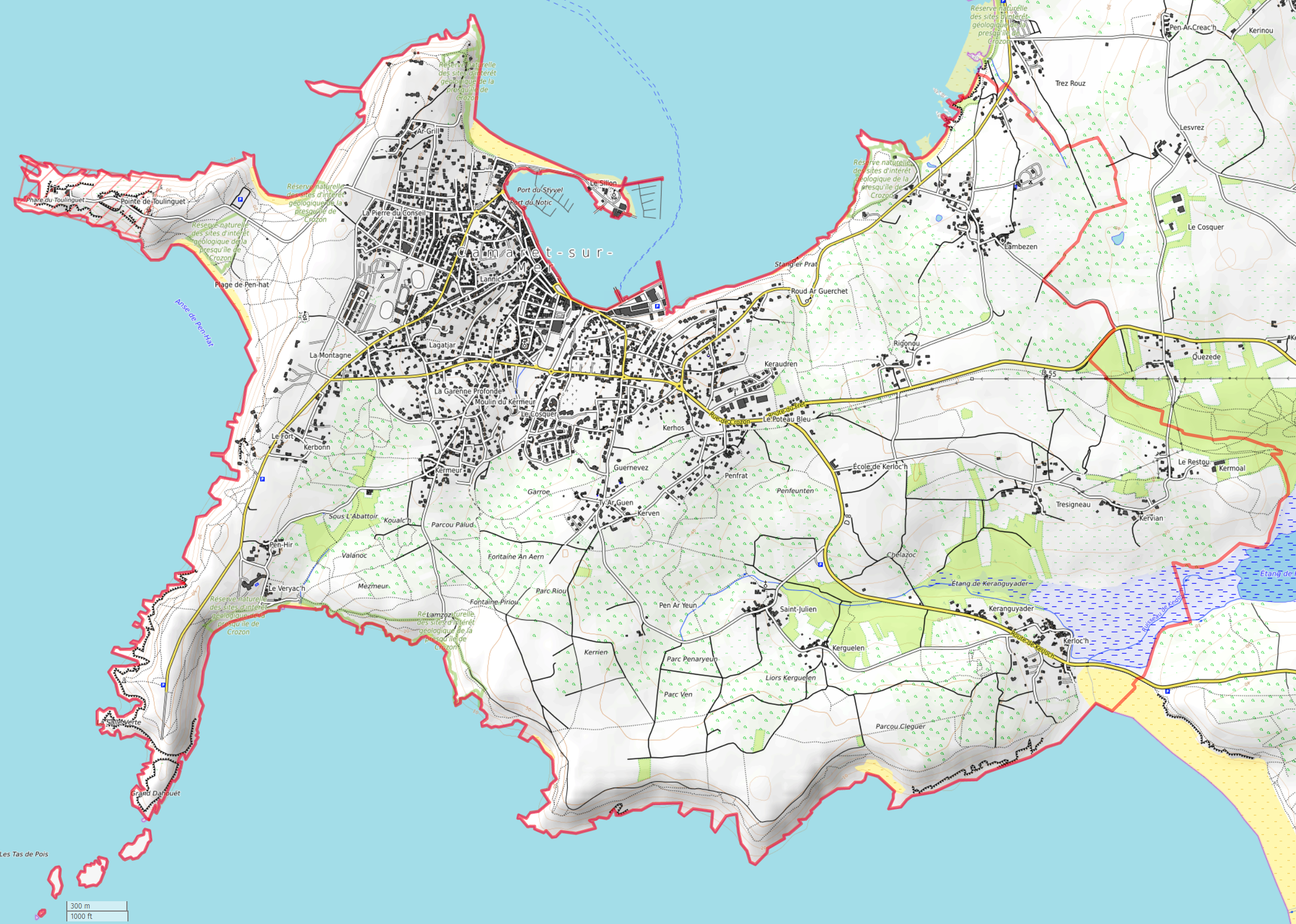
Topographic map

== Twinning ==
Camaret-sur-Mer is twinned with St Ives, Cornwall, UK.

== See also ==
- Communes of the Finistère department
- Saint-Pol-Roux
- Parc naturel régional d'Armorique
- "List of the works of Charles Cottet depicting scenes of Brittany"
