= Roscanvel =

Roscanvel Roskañvel
- Commune
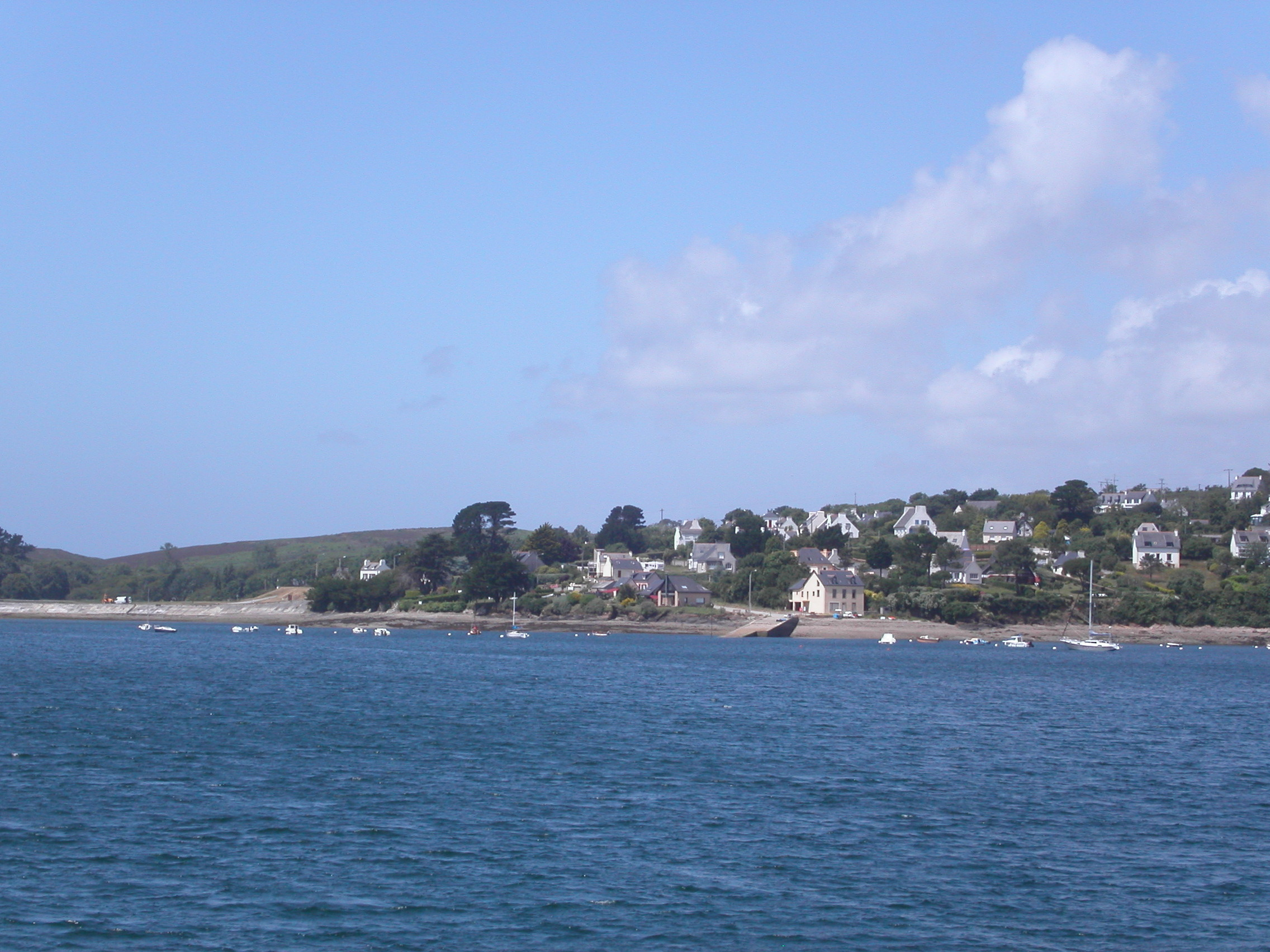
- Roscanvel view of the roadstead of Brest in 2008

- Coat of arms
- Location of Roscanvel
- Location within France Location within Brittany
- Coordinates: 48°19′02″N 4°32′50″W
- Country: France
- Region: Brittany
- Department: Finistère
- Arrondissement: Châteaulin
- Canton: Crozon
- Intercommunality: Presqu'île de Crozon-Aulne maritime

Government
  - Mayor (2020–2026): Jean-Yves Gourvez
- Area^{1}: 9.08 km^{2} (3.51 sq mi)
- Highest elevation: 78 m (256 ft)
- Lowest elevation: 0 m (0 ft)
- Population (2023): 855
  - Density: 94.2/km^{2} (244/sq mi)
- Time zone: UTC+01:00 (CET)
  - Summer (DST): UTC+02:00 (CEST)
- INSEE/Postal code: 29238 /29570
- ^{1} French Land Register data, which excludes lakes, ponds, glaciers > 1 km^{2} (0.386 sq mi or 247 acres) and river estuaries.

Roscanvel (French pronunciation: [ʁɔskɑ̃vɛl]; Breton: Roskañvel) is a commune in the Finistère department of Brittany in north-western France.

== History ==
=== List of Mayors ===
List of Mayors of Roscanvel
Period	Name
Since 2020	Jean-Yves Gourvez
2014–2020	Bernard Copin (DVD) — Retired
2008–2014	Patrick Le Guillou (DVG)
2001–2008	Bernard Étiemble (DVD)
1995–2001	Alexandre Boléat
1989–1995	Jacques Chevalier (or Jean-Paul Garbail?)
1983–1989	Marcel Faure
1971–1983	Francis Mazé (Cent. G)
1969–1971	Georges Guéneron
1952–1969	Unknown (Deputy Mayor: Michel Rioualen)
1935–1952	Hippolyte Mériadec (SFIO)
1931–1934	Rodolphe Passini (Rad. ind)
June–July 1931	Principe Le Mérour
1930–1931	Théodore Madec
1929–1930	François Laouénan
1925–1929	Jacques Balch
1910–1925	Étienne Joseph Le Cœur
1904–1910	Henri Goascoz
1884–1904	Hippolyte Madec
1861–1884	Jean Marie Stéphan
1854–1860	Congard
1850–1853	Salomon
1844–1848	Pellen
1832–1836	Salomon
1826–1829	Henri Congard
1824–1826	Jean Mathurin René Brunet
1817–1824	Claude Morvan
1816	Yves Crenn
1808–1815	Paul Le Guen
1803–1804	Allavoine
...–1800	Thomas Louis Le Mignon
March 1795	Fraboulet

== Population ==
Historical population
Year	Pop.	±% p.a.
1968	613	—
1975	574	−0.93%
1982	697	+2.81%
1990	740	+0.75%
1999	787	+0.69%
2007	997	+3.00%
2012	876	−2.55%
2017	839	−0.86%
2023	855	+0.32%
Source: INSEE

Inhabitants of Roscanvel are called in French Roscanvelistes.

== See also ==
- Quélern
- Communes of the Finistère department
- Parc naturel régional d'Armorique

== Bibliography ==
- Mayors of Finistère Association (in French)
