= Roadstead of Brest =

Bay in Brittany, France

- Rade de Brest (French); Lenn-vor Brest (Breton)
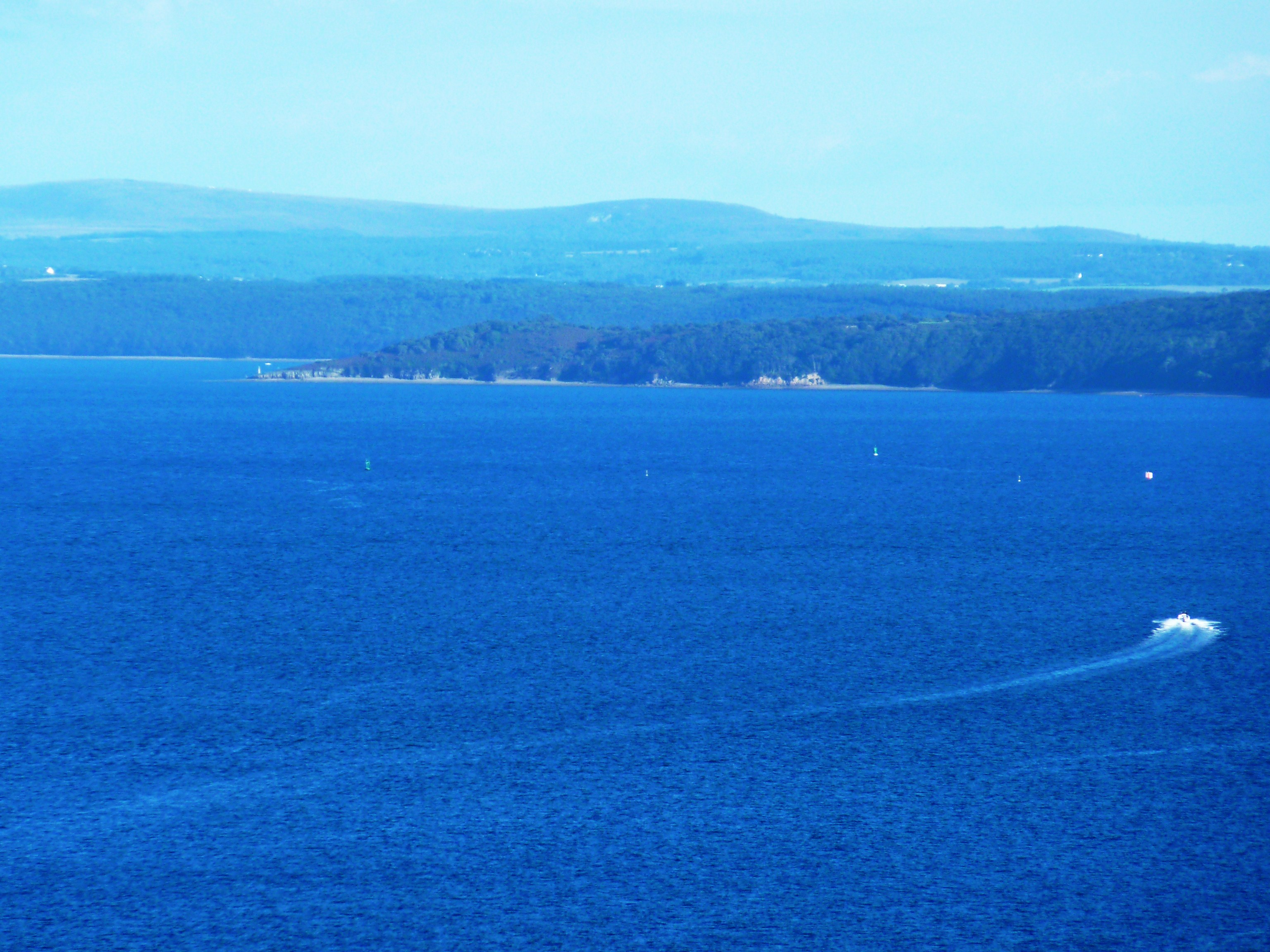
- The southern part of the roadstead of Brest

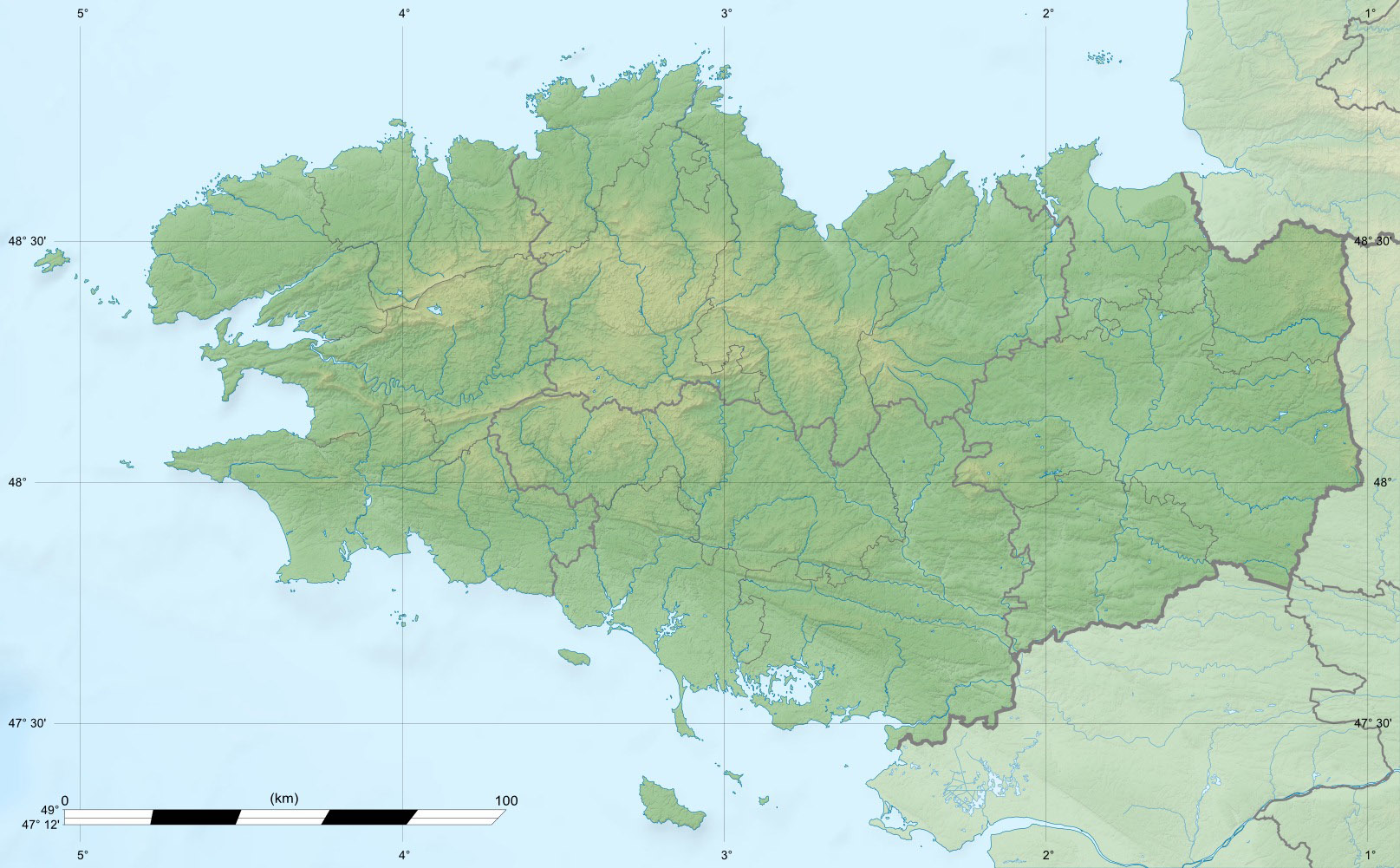
- Location within France Location within Brittany
- Location: Iroise Sea, Atlantic Ocean
- Coordinates: 48°20′02″N 4°28′47″W
- Type: roadstead
- Max. length: 15 km (9.3 mi)
- Max. width: 4 km (2.5 mi)
- Surface area: 180 km^{2} (69 mi^{2})

Map of the roadstead of Brest

The roadstead of Brest (French: rade de Brest, French pronunciation: [ʁad də bʁɛst]; Breton: Lenn-vor Brest) is a roadstead or bay located in the Finistère department in Brittany in northwestern France. The surface area is about 180 km² (70 sq mi). The port of Brest and one of the two French naval bases, Brest Arsenal, are located on its northern edge. It is linked to the Atlantic Ocean (called the Iroise Sea at this point) by the Goulet de Brest, a strait about 1.8 km wide. Three main rivers drain into the roadstead: the Penfeld (the town of Brest and the first buildings of the naval base were built on its banks), the Élorn (or river of Landerneau) and the Aulne (or river of Châteaulin).

== Strategic importance ==
For a number of centuries, Brest has been an important military port. The easily defensible roadstead of Brest therefore has a number of military installations, for example:

- Fort du Mengant, and Brest Arsenal, on the north of the bay;
- the submarine base of the Île Longue, to the south-west;
- the École Navale naval college and the Poulmic association of schools at Lanvéoc;
- the naval "graveyard" for ships at Landévennec.

One can also find many remains of old military fortifications and other ruins from past centuries, like the forts at Portzic, at pointe des Espagnols, etc.

On 3 March 1685, the author François-Timoléon de Choisy paused at Roche Mengant (a rock in the middle of the entry into the roadstead) whilst on his way from Brest to Siam, and had the following to say about the defences:

"This is a rock at the entry to the roads; it is right in the middle of the channel; they want to build a fort there and construct a good battery on it. Already a lot of stones have been cast down, but the sea undoes more in a quarter of an hour what it takes (sic) six months to lay down. Work is being done on gun emplacements on either side of the passage; the cannons will crossfire, but if there were a battery on the rock in the middle, it would be impossible for enemy vessels to enter the roadstead, where more than 10,000 ships would be safe".

== Islands within the roadstead of Brest ==
- Plougastel Daoulas:
  - Île Ronde.
- Logonna Daoulas:
  - Île de la Pointe du Château;
  - Îles du Bindy.
- Hôpital-Camfrout:
  - Île de Tibidy.
- Rosnoën:
  - Île d'Arun;
  - Île de Térénez.
- Crozon:
  - Île Longue;
  - Île du Renard;
  - Île Trébéron;
  - Île des Morts;
  - Île Perdue.

== Rivers flowing into the roadstead of Brest ==
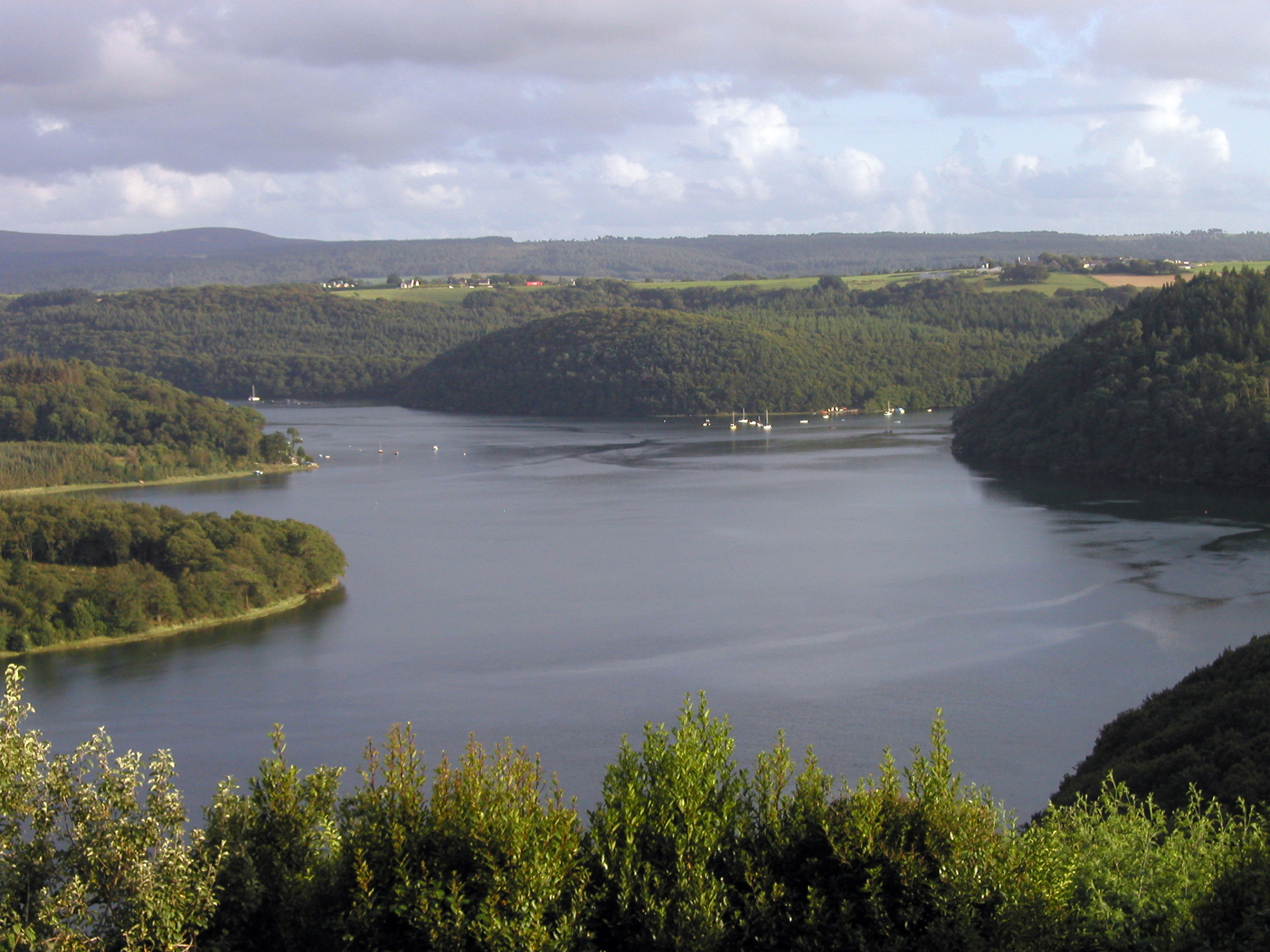
End of the roadstead of Brest, at Landévennec

- Penfeld;
- Élorn;
- the river of Daoulas;
- Aulne;
- the river of Faou.

== Environment ==
Thanks to its layout, the roadstead harbours a wide diversity of natural habitats and a high level of biodiversity. It also includes many sites of importance for birds, several networks of habitats and underwater corridors and coastal areas of importance. These areas have been greatly affected by human activities in the north-west, but have justified the classification of around half of the roadstead as a zone in Natura 2000.

=== Pollution ===
The rich ecology of the roadstead has been diminished by the past exploitation of certain resources, and by the presence of a number of pollutants including heavy metals and tributyltin which were used as biocides in anti-fouling bottom paints. These products are now illegal, but they remain present in sediments and certain organisms. The products which have replaced them for small boats (e.g. Diuron and Irgarol) pose similar problems and have been measured in non-negligible quantities in the roadstead by Ifremer in 2003–2004.

The roadstead is also a victim of the after-effects of war, and in particular the waves of pollution from the World War I and the World War II. Pollutants trapped in submerged or unexploded munitions are expected to aggravate existing pollution, with the first large leaks predicted by experts to occur in the years 2000–2010.
