= Brest Maritime Works Directorate =

The Brest Maritime Works Directorate (direction des travaux maritimes de Brest, now Direction régionale du service d'infrastructure de la Défense de Brest) was the name of one of the decentralised directorates within France's SID (Service d'infrastructure de la défense). It is based at Brest and it oversees the expansion and maintenance of the French Navy's military infrastructure in Brest's military port and its annexes, in the operational base on Île Longue, the Lorient military port and the signal-stations chain along the west Brittany coast.

In 2025 the directorate was renamed as the Service d'infrastructure de la défense Atlantique ("SID Atlantique").

== Heads ==
=== Fortifications engineers ===
- 1682-1691 : Siméon Garangeau
- 1691-1713 : Mollart
- 1713-1728 : Isaac Robelin
- 1728-1739 : Angères du Mains
- 1739-1743 : Amédée François Frézier

=== Port engineers ===
- 1743-1746 : Blaise Ollivier
- 1746-1782 : Antoine Choquet de Lindu
- 1782-1793 : Étienne Nicolas Blondeau
- 1793-1797 : Camus
- 1797-1800 : Martret
- 1800-1802 : Delorme
- 1802-1808 : Jean Bernard Tarbé de Vauxclairs

=== Directors of maritime works ===
- 1808-1819 : Jean-Nicolas Trouille
- 1818-1829 : Antoine Elie Lamblardie
- 1829-1845 : Pierre Trotté de la Roche
- 1845-1847 : Lemoigne
- 1847-1849 : Menu du Mesnil

=== Directors of hydraulic works ===
- 1849-1856 : Méry
- 1857-1876 : Dehargne
- 1876-1880 : Verrier
- 1881-1894 : Jenner
- 1895-1910 : De Miniac
- 1910-1913 : Bézault
- 1914-1923 : Mallat

=== Directors of maritime works ===
- 1924-1940 : Thévenot
- 1940-1945 : Estrade
- 1945-1950 : Cayotte
- 1950-1951 : Hamoniaux
- 1951-1957 : Olliéro
- 1957-1960 : Boué
- 1961-1963 : Heuze
- 1964-1966 : Gendrot
- 1966-1978 : Bertrand
- 1978-1981 : Raunet
- 1981-1987 : Pierre Romenteau
- 1987-2001 : Philippe Pascal
- 2001-... : Alain Ollivier
