= Île de Tibidy =

Coordinates: 48°18′0.4″N 4°14′50.89″W

Tibidy (Latin - insula Thopopegya or insula Thopepigia) is a French islet at the mouth of the river Faou, at the bottom of the roadstead of Brest, on land belonging to the commune of L'Hôpital-Camfrout. Its highest point is 15m. The island houses a private manor and is linked to the mainland by a spit.

A legend given in the life of Saint Guénolé by the cartulary of Landévennec Abbey states that Saint Guénolé, accompanied by 11 other disciples of Saint Budoc, arrived from Île Lavret (archipelago of Bréhat) on île de Tibidy and there set up an oratory. Three years later, they left the island and reached Landévennec, with the island then being given to Landévennec Abbey by Gradlon.
