= Île de Térénez =

Island in Finistère, France

Coordinates: 48°17′1″N 4°16′46″W

Île de Térénez (Breton: Enez Térénez) is a French islet inside the last bend of the river Aulne, on the territory of the commune of Rosnoën. Its highest point is 18m. Covered in woods, it is accessible by dry land at low tide and faces the Landévennec ship graveyard and Landévennec Abbey. The corniche de Térénez, running along the right bank of the Aulne for 4 kilometres, leads to the pont de Térénez, located 2.5 km further upstream. The island has several locations where recreational boaters may anchor their vessels.

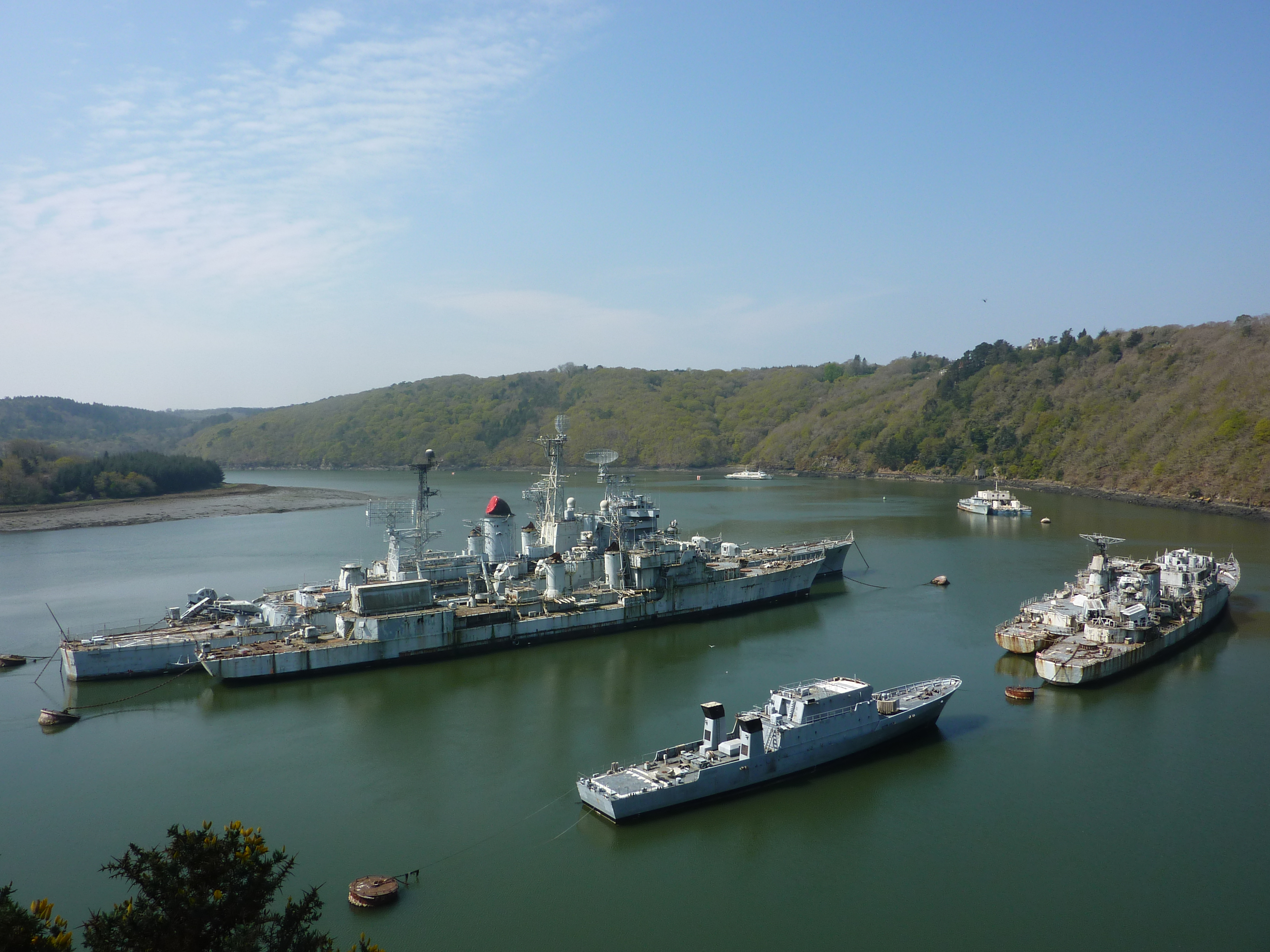
French navy graveyard at Landévennec near Brest, Île de Térénez visible in top left corner
