= Térénez bridge =

- Coordinates: 48.271211°N 4.262836°W
- Locale: Crozon
- Official name: Pont du Térenez

Characteristics
- Design: Cable-stayed bridge

History
- Construction start: 19 April 2007
- Construction end: 17 April 2011

Location
- Interactive map of Térénez bridge

The Térénez bridge is a cable-stayed bridge, located between Landévennec and Rosnoën, Finistère, France.

It is 515 metres long and connects the Crozon peninsula with northern Brittany. It is a fan cable arrangement, with a curved deck. Construction commenced on 19 April 2007 and the bridge was inaugurated on 17 April 2011 and opened for general traffic later that day. It cost €35,000,000.

== Earlier bridges ==
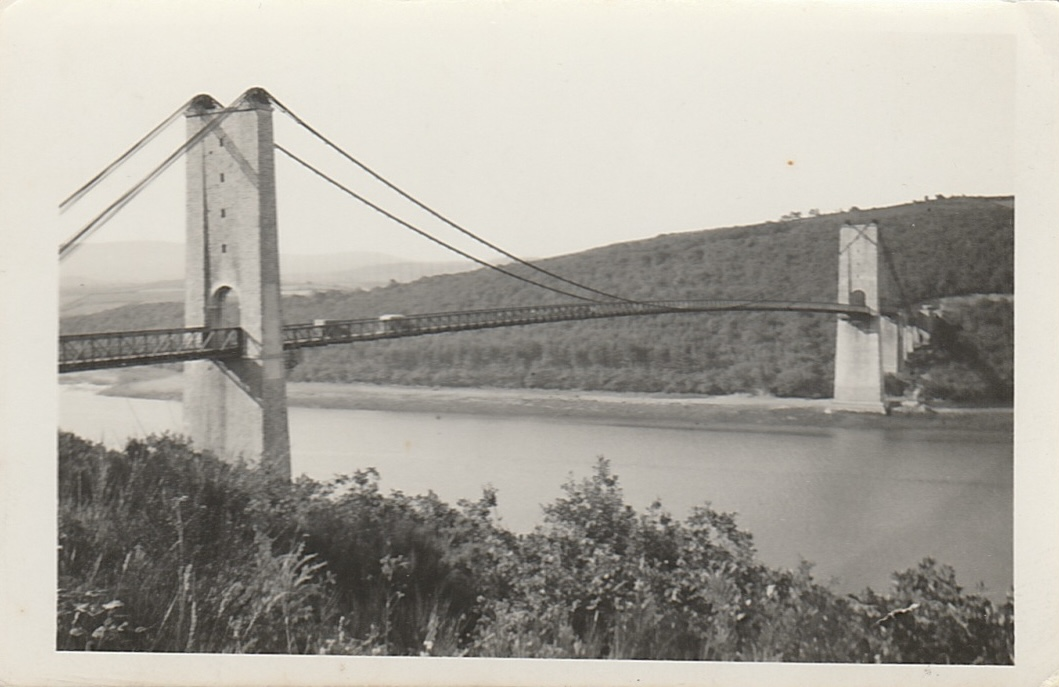
The original bridge, seen from Crozon

Slightly upstream from the current bridge stands an earlier suspension bridge. Originally completed in 1925, it was destroyed in World War II and rebuilt in 1951 with the same concrete towers. Over time these towers suffered from alkali-silica reaction (‘Concrete cancer’) and were deemed no longer rational to maintain, necessitating the current, cable-stayed design.

== Design and construction process ==
The bridge was designed by architect Charles Lavigne and consulting engineer Michel Virlogeux. The project was commissioned by Centre Expérimental de Recherches et d'Études du Bâtiment et des Travaux Publics (CEBTP) and cocontracted by VINCI Construction France, Campenon Bernard TP, GTM Génie Civil et Services and Sogea Bretagne. Wind analysis of the structure was performed by Scientific and Technical Centre for Building. The total cost of the construction was estimated to be €35,000,000.

== Structural analysis ==
Somewhat similar to suspension bridges such as the Humber Bridge, the Golden Gate Bridge and the Brooklyn Bridge, cable-stayed bridges like the Térénez Bridge use steel cables to transfer loads from the bridge deck to the towers. However cable-stayed bridges are actually very different from suspension bridges in principles and method of construction. In a suspension bridge, the long cables are the primary load-bearing structures that are mainly responsible for the function of the bridge; for a cable-stayed bridge, the pylons form the primary load-bearing structures. For a bridge span of medium length such as that of the Térénez Bridge a cable-stayed design is optimal from both structural and economic perspectives. Since the cables of the Térénez Bridge will not be exerting large horizontal tensile forces on the anchorages, construction of the bridge does not require excellent soil conditions. The deck of a cable-stayed bridge will also be stiffer than that of a suspension bridge and therefore deformations of the deck under live loads are generally smaller. In addition, construction of a cable-stayed bridge will be simpler since the structure can be built by cantilevering out from the pylons.

Difference between types of bridge

Suspension bridge

Cable-stayed bridge, fan design

Cable-stayed bridge, harp design

Although Térénez is designed with an asymmetric form, observation of its cross-section shows that tensile loads in cables are transferred to the top of the towers in a rather symmetric manner. The top of each pylon is in fact located above the centre of the deck’s cross-section and cables are evenly distributed on both sides of the tower. Each pylon seems like a giant man standing inside the River Aulne with his legs spread out and steel cable arms holding the deck of the bridge. The ‘giant man’ also directly supports vertical loads flowing down from the deck onto his ‘lap’. With both of the towers located on the same side of the bridge deck, it actually is reasonable to create a curved deck to stabilize the overall structure in the horizontal direction.

== See also ==
- List of bridges in France
