= Île d'Arun =

Islet in Finistère, France

Coordinates: 48°17′30″N 4°14′24″W

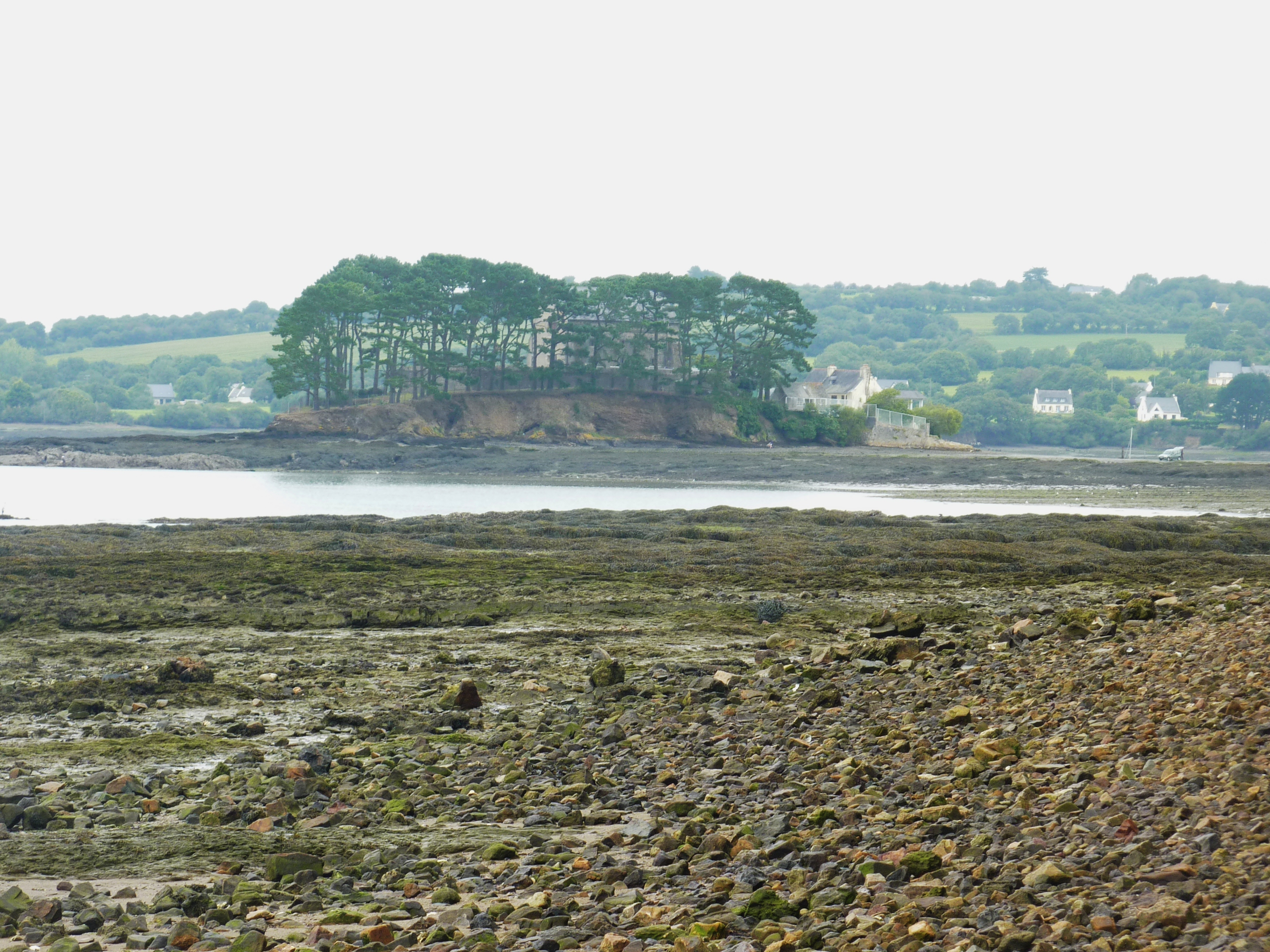

The Île d'Arun (Breton: Enez Arun) is an islet in the confluence of the rivers Aulne and Le Faou, at the base of the roadstead of Brest. It is located in the territory of the commune of Rosnoën in Finistère, France, and its highest point above sea level is 11m. Accessible by a land route, it was the stopping-off point for gunpowder headed from the powder-mills at Pont-de-Buis to the naval port at Brest. It thus has the remains of a powder-magazine.
