= Jean-Nicolas =

Jean-Nicolas is a French compound given name, a combination of Jean and Nicolas. Notable people with the name include:

- Jean-Nicolas Bouilly (1763–1842), French playwright, librettist and politician
- Jean-Nicolas Boulay (1837–1905), French clergyman, bryologist and paleobotanist
- Jean-Nicolas Carrière (born 1985), Canadian football player
- Jean-Nicolas Corvisart (1755–1821), French physician
- Jean-Nicolas Curély (1774–1827), French cavalry officer
- Jean-Nicolas Céré (1737–1810), French botanist and agronomist
- Jean-Nicolas Démeunier (1751–1814), French writer and politician
- Jean-Nicolas de Francine (1662–1735), French musician
- Jean-Nicolas Gannal (1791–1852), French chemist
- Jean-Nicolas Geoffroy (1633–1694), French harpsichordist, organist and composer
- Jean-Nicolas Huyot (1780–1840), French architect
- Jean-Nicolas Laverlochère (1812–1884), French Roman Catholic missionary in Canada
- Jean-Nicolas Lemmens (1850–1897), Dutch Catholic bishop
- Jean-Nicolas Marjolin (1780–1850), French surgeon and pathologist
- Jean-Nicolas Marrigues (1757–1834), French organist
- Jean-Nicolas Pache (1746–1823), French politician
- Jean-Nicolas Nissage Saget (1810–1880), President of Haiti
- Jean-Nicolas Stofflet (1753–1796), French military leader
- Jean-Nicolas Trouille (1750–1825) was a French architect, engineer and politician
