= Île des Morts =

Coordinates: 48°18′11″N 04°32′14″W

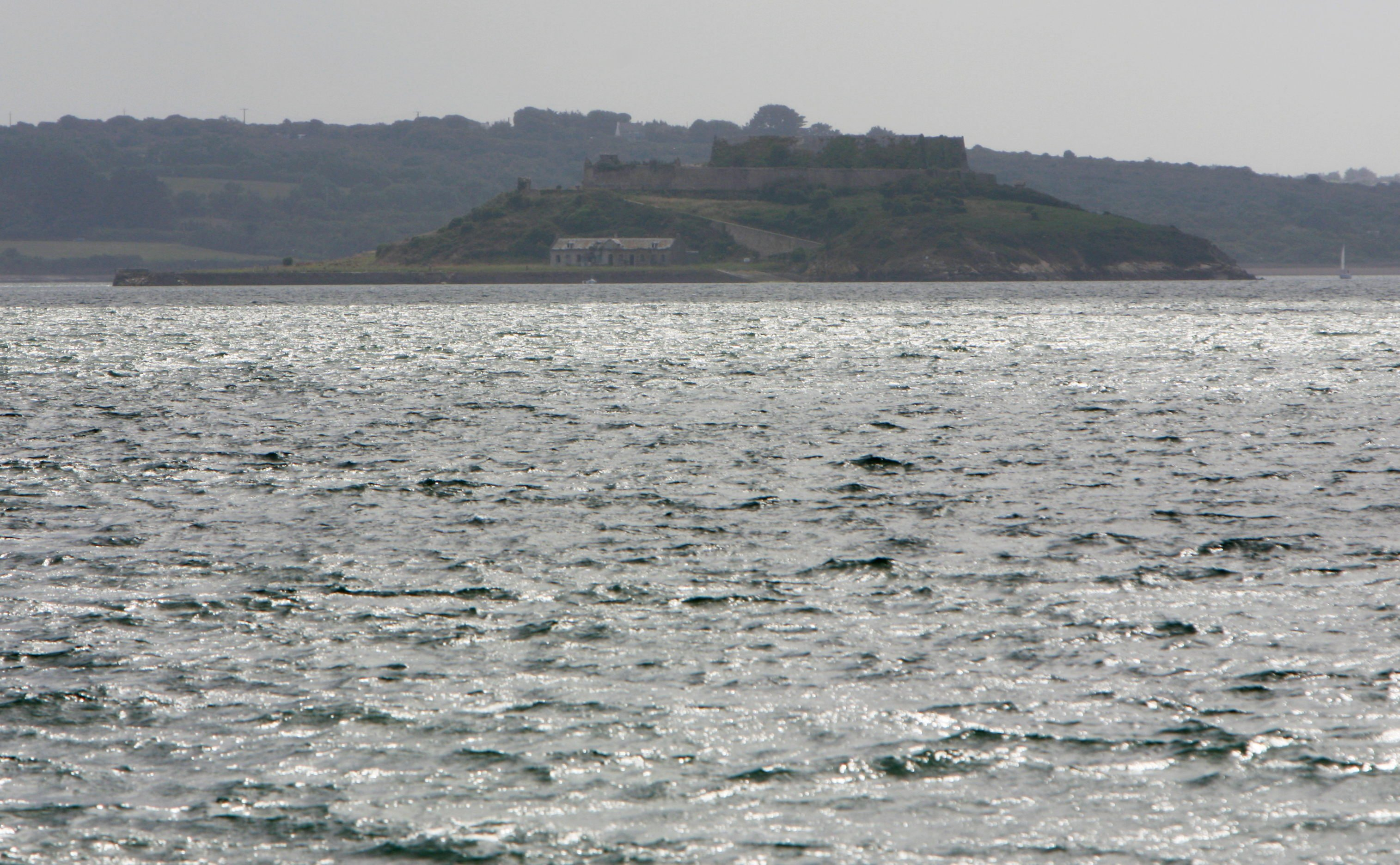

Île des Morts (Island of the Dead; Breton: Enez ar re Varv) is a 7-hectare island in the Bay of Roscanvel, to the south-west of the roadstead of Brest, between the Quélern peninsula and Île Longue. It is 26m above sea level at its highest point.

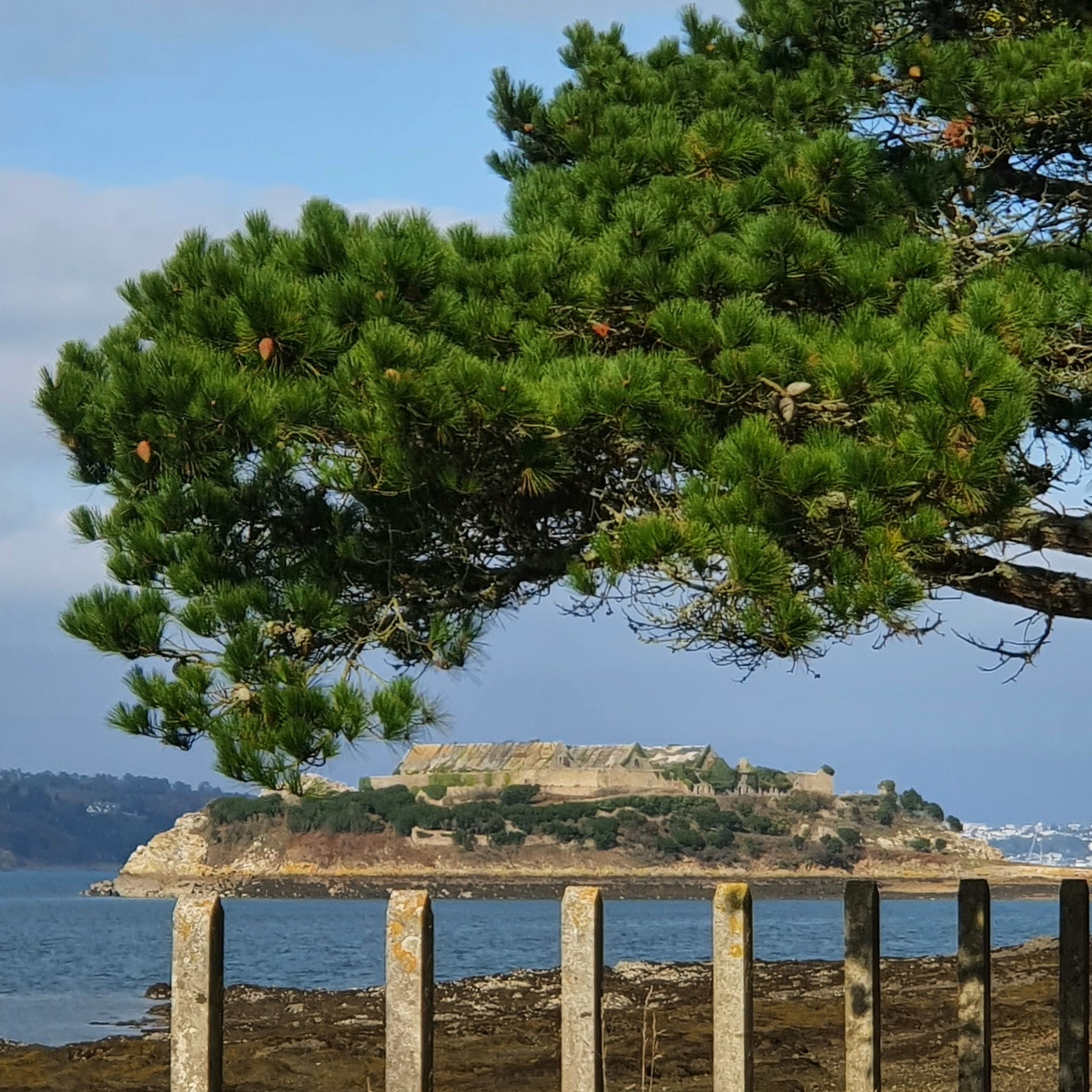
l'île des morts

== History ==
In 1720, the neighbouring island of Trébéron became a quarantine island or lazaret for lepers, with Île des Morts as its cemetery. During the 18th century, the arsenal at Brest was supplied with gunpowder from the powder-mills of Pont-de-Buis. Transported by boat, the gunpowder made a last stop at the île d'Arun, at the mouth of the River Aulne. However, the magazine on the île d'Arun was small and remote from Brest and was not convenient in the context of the Napoleonic Wars, with the British fleet blockading Brest. In 1808, Jean-Nicolas Trouille, director of the maritime works at Brest, decided to develop Île de Morts by adding powder magazines. The rock-breaking works done by convicts from the Brest prison allowed him to level a plateau on which to build three 45m-long and 12m wide two-level powder-magazines (in which the use of metal was banned to avoid risk of explosion). In completing the magazines, he also built a mole out towards île Trébéron, several landing points and a barracks for the magazines' garrison.

Île des Morts, West of the Île Longue.

In 1868, with the railways' arrival in Brest, the French Navy decided to build a new powder magazine at the Saint-Nicolas powder-factory, at Guipavas. Even so, the Île des Morts continued in use in both World Wars, during which time the metal "Decauville" road was built, which still survives. In 1960, the installations on the island were decommissioned and some years later the island became included in the protective perimeter around Île Longue – it is still closed to public access.
