= Sari cancer =

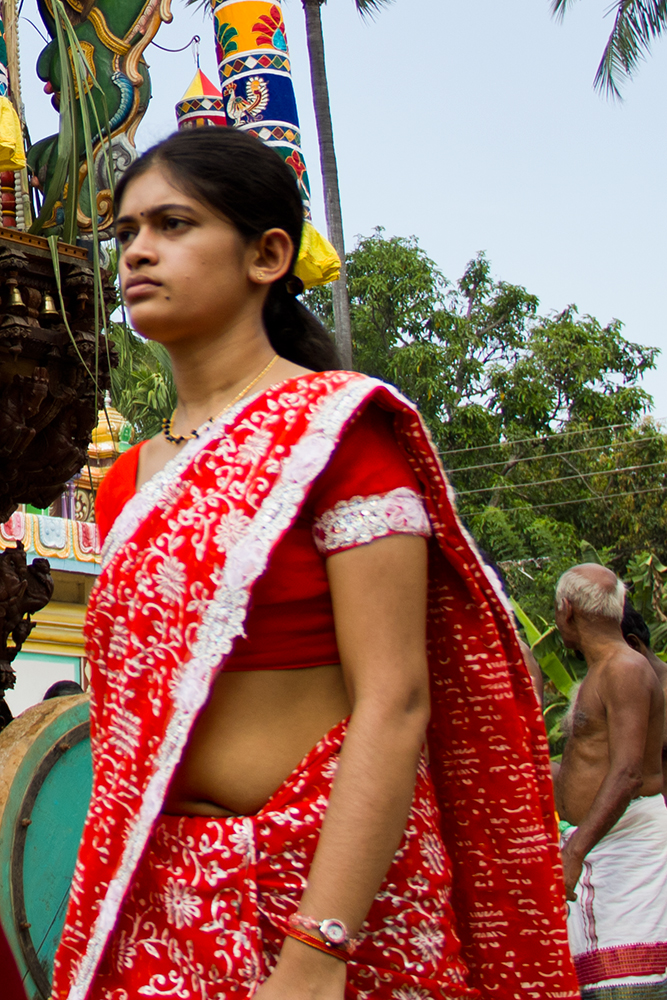
- Sari tightened around the waist. A man wearing a dhoti is seen in the background.
- Specialty: Dermatology
- Causes: Friction across the skin

Sari cancer is a rare form of skin cancer that occurs along the waistline in females wearing the sari, caused by constant irritation which can result in scaling and changes in pigmentation of the skin. It is a rare type of cancer and have been found in the Indian subcontinent, where saris are commonly worn by girls and women throughout their lives. Although, it has more to do with hygiene and not taking care of one's skin. It involves chronic inflammation. It is a type of cutaneous squamous-cell carcinoma.

== Signs and symptoms ==
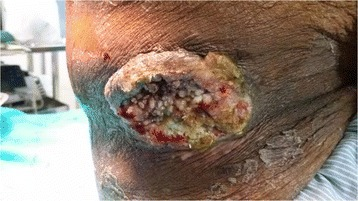
65-year-old indian male with ulceroproliferative growth of Cutaneous squamous-cell carcinoma on the waist, an example of dhoti cancer

The foremost symptoms of sari cancer are the constant irritation with scaling and pigmentation change at the waistline; gradually, over the course of many years, these become chronic. The person may have non-healing ulcer or a hyper- or hypopigmented patch or a growth-like lesion over the waistline. The lesion may be associated with serous discharge with foul smell.

== Cause ==
The sari is common female attire in the Indian subcontinent. It is a piece of long (generally 5.5 metres or 18 feet) cloth which can be made of various materials: cotton, silk, nylon or synthetic fibers. It is worn over an inner skirt (petticoat) which is tightened around the waist by a thick cotton cord. This is the traditional costume of most Indian women. The sari is attached to the waist throughout the day in the hot and humid climate. The waist is often soiled with dust and sweat and remains without proper cleaning. This causes changes in pigmentation and mild scaling over the waist. This, in turn, causes chronic irritation and gradually malignancy may develop in the skin at the waistline.

== Management ==
Excision biopsy is required to confirm the diagnosis of sari cancer. In many cases local excision with skin grafting is considered the appropriate treatment. Different ways of wearing the petticoat may help sari-wearers to prevent sari cancer. Some such strategies are:

- Loosening the petticoat
- Changing the usual rope-like belt to broader ones that reduce pressure on the area
- Continuously changing the level at which the petticoat is tied

== History ==
In 1945 physicians Khanolkar and Suryabai described a new type of skin cancer with hypopigmented and thickened scars which were more likely to progress into malignant lesions. They termed it "dhoti cancer", the dhoti being a traditional male costume of India which like the sari is wrapped around the waist. The term "sari cancer" was first used by a group of doctors led by Dr. A. S. Patil from Bombay Hospital, India, in the Bombay Hospital Journal. The dermatological problem in the waist of Indian women wearing saris had been recognised before by some other researchers. This type of cancer is related to Marjolin's ulcer, the malignant degeneration of a chronic wound which was described by Jean-Nicolas Marjolin in 1828.
