= François Étienne de Rosily-Mesros =

French Navy officer

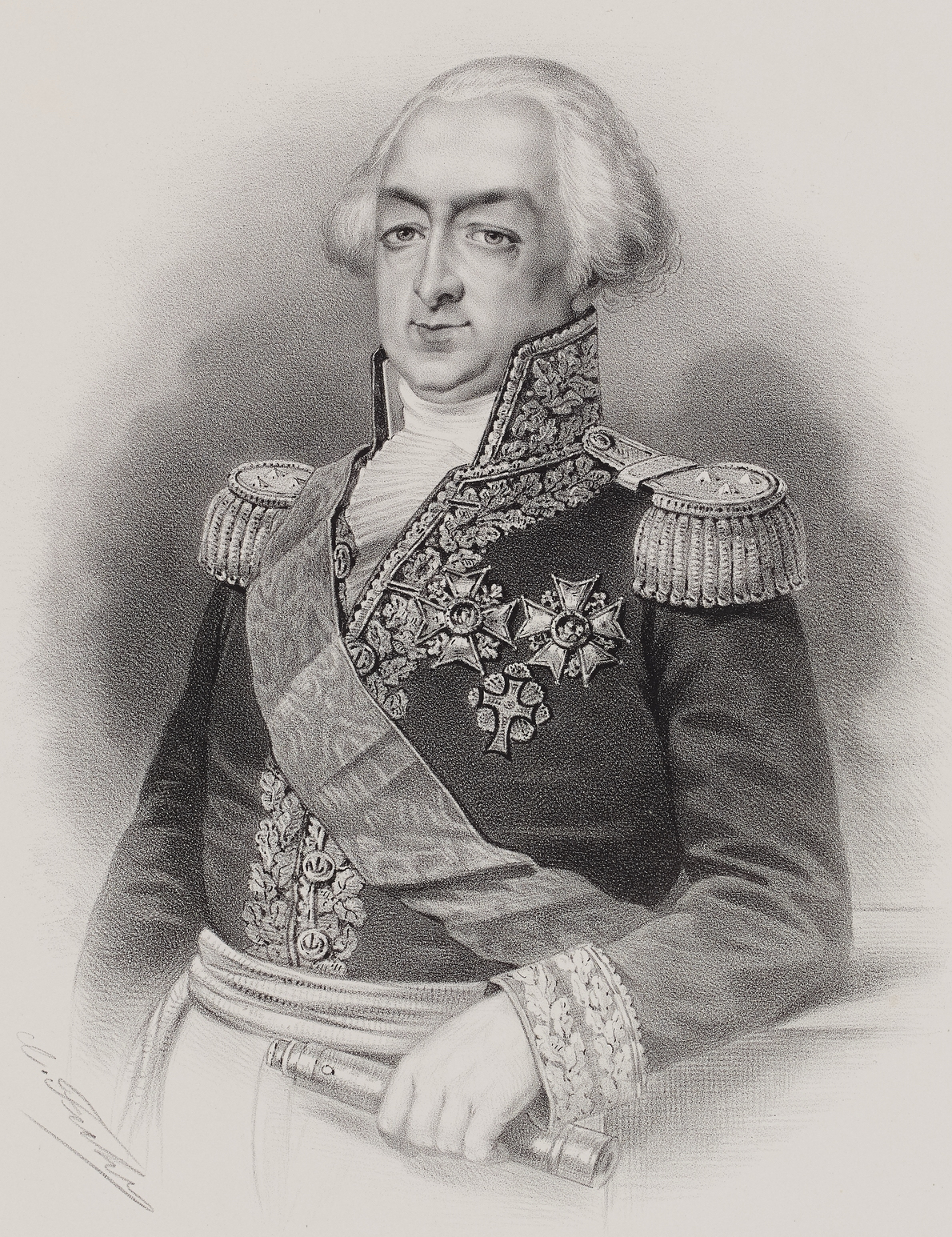
- Portrait of Rosily-Mesros
- Born: 13 January 1748; Brest, France
- Died: 12 November 1832 (aged 84); Paris, France
- Military career
- Allegiance: Kingdom of France; First French Republic; First French Empire
- Branch: French Navy; French Imperial Navy
- Service years: 1762–1827
- Rank: Vice admiral
- Commands: Cadiz
- Awards: Order of Saint Louis, Legion of Honour, name inscribed on the Arc de Triomphe

Vice-Admiral François Étienne de Rosily-Mesros (13 January 1748 – 12 November 1832) was a French Navy officer who served in the French Revolutionary and Napoleonic Wars. He was chosen by Napoleon to succeed Pierre-Charles Villeneuve as commander of the combined Franco-Spanish fleet at Cádiz, arriving to take up his appointment just after its defeat at the Battle of Trafalgar. His name is inscribed on the east side of the Arc de Triomphe.

== Life ==
=== Early service ===
His father the comte de Rosily was a chef d'escadre and was commanding the Brest fleet in 1762 when he admitted François as a garde de marine. From 1762 to 1769 François completed his apprenticeship at sea in several varied campaigns, visiting Rio de Janeiro, Newfoundland, Hispaniola and the Antilles. He became an enseigne de vaisseau in 1770, on a ship commanded by Kerguelen. Under Kerguelen he then went on a surveying trip along the French coast before setting out on a circumnavigation of the globe whose aim was to research the unknown 'Terra Australis' for France. On 13 February 1772 it was believed he had discovered it and Rosily was sent out in a launch to reconnoitre it. On the launch's return, however, Kerguelen's frigate had disappeared. Rescued by the other ship of the expedition, the fluyt Gros-Ventre, Rosily travelled on her for 8 months and finally reached France in 1773. He left immediately afterwards to rejoin Kerguelen, who was by then once again on his way out east in an attempt to find the 'Terra Australis' and rescue Rosily. Rosily caught up with Kerguelen at Mauritius, where he was put in command of the corvette Ambition : this voyage lasted 14 months.

On Rosily's next return to France at the end of 1774, he visited the ports of Britain and Ireland, bringing back several inventions and materials of use to the French navy, such as chain pumps. He was promoted to ship-of-the-line lieutenant in 1778 and placed in command of the lugger Coureur, with which Rosily patrolled the English Channel under the command of la Clocheterie, commander of the frigate Belle Poule. On 17 June that year Belle Poule was attacked by the Royal Navy frigate Arethusa and the 14-gun cutter Alert. Rosily did not hesitate to attack Alert and saved Belle Poule despite Coureur being completely dismasted, holed on all sides and forced to strike her colours. He was awarded the croix de Saint-Louis for this action and returned to Brest in February 1780. In May 1780 he took command of the frigate Lively. Rosily then served as lieutenant en pied in 1781 on board the ship of the line Fendant, before exchanging this command for that of the frigate Cléopâtre and rallying to the bailli de Suffren's squadron at Trincomalee. Following the end of hostilities in 1783 Suffren's fleet returned to France. The following year Rosily was promoted to ship-of-the-line captain.

=== Hydrographic work ===
Put at the head of various political, commercial and scientific missions, he set out from Brest once again in February 1785 and spent the next seven years on difficult and perilous voyages in the Red Sea, Indian Ocean and the seas off China. In his funeral elogy for Rosily in 1832, the hydrographic engineer M. Beautemps-Beaupré witnessed to Rosily's hydrographic work during this time, though this work was superseded by that of others by the end of the 19th century. This work did, however, gain Rosily the rank of contre-amiral and (on 22 August 1795) that of director and inspector general of the naval charts and plans department.

Rosily then commanded the forces in the port of Rochefort before being made vice-admiral on 22 September 1796 and carrying out various missions to Genoa, La Spezia, Boulogne and Antwerp. It was in between these voyages that he provided Bonaparte with information for the latter's Egyptian expedition. It is claimed Bonaparte even offered him supreme command of the fleet carrying his forces to Egypt, but that he refused as he was unwilling to leave his young family. Later, wishing to get the Toulon squadron out of Dumanoir's hands, Napoleon wrote to naval minister Decrès on 28 August 1804 "It seems to me that, for commanding a squadron, only three men will do: Bruix, Villeneuve and Rosily. As for Rosily, I believe he is of good will, but he has done nothing for 15 years, and I don't know whether he is a good sailor and what commands he has had. However, it is very urgent that I take a position on that."

=== Relations with Napoleon ===
Rosily knew the emperor had considered him for the Egyptian post and, hoping to be given some other command soon afterwards, he asked to be promoted to a rank within the Legion of Honour more worthy of his past services. (He had already been made a member of the Légion on 11 December 1803 and a commander in it on 14 June 1804.) Unhappy with Rosily's request, Bonaparte wrote to Decrès from Stupini on 29 April 1805:

Monsieur Rosily has written to me to demand he become a grand-officer of the Légion-d'Honneur. This makes difficulties for me. I have Missiessy, Gourdon, Lacrosse and Magon in mind to promote [to that rank] before him; he is thus very wrong to compare himself to Bruix, to Ganteaume, to you, to Villeneuve. I even esteem that any captain who has done active service and who is worthy of it is worthy of more consideration that Monsieur Rosily. Even so, he is a good officer; he is not so old as to be unable of [further] active service at sea. See if you can employ him, or if he can stay as he is; but I will not hear him speak any further of any kind of advancement. Men who remain in Paris cannot compare themselves to men who exposed themselves to all the dangers one runs at sea, and as soon as they rise to comparing themselves to them, we must remind them and put them in their place

Even if Napoleon did not judge Rosily right for being entrusted with active service at sea, he at least did not refuse him employment on certain mapping trips useful to his projects. On 14 August 1805 he commanded minister Decrès to order Rosily to make "a highly-detailed Mémoire about the coast of Africa".

=== Cádiz ===
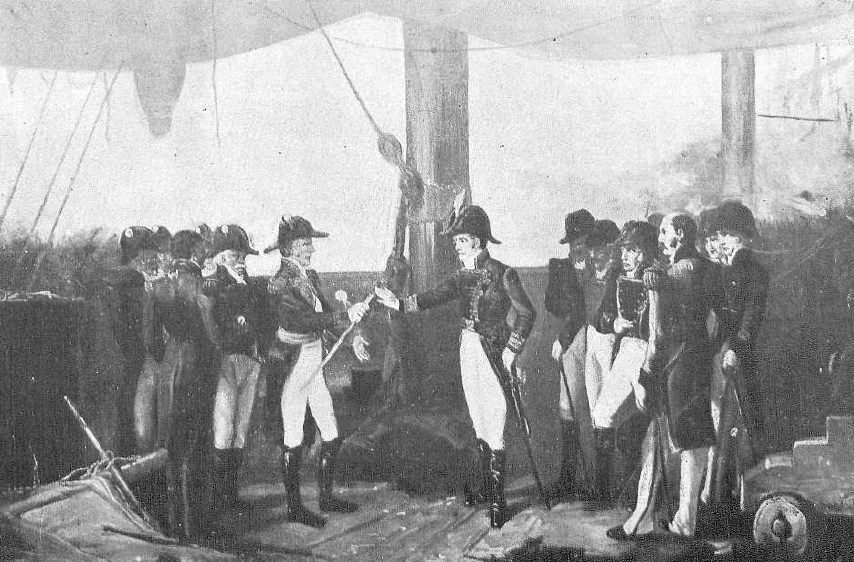
Rosily surrendering his sword to Juan Ruiz de Apodaca on 14 June 1808

Finally Rosily received a major command. The combined French and Spanish fleets, totalling 33 ships of the line and under Villeneuve's overall command, was blockaded in Cádiz by the British. Unhappy with Villeneuve's inability to break out, Napoleon sacked him and replaced him with Rosily. On 18 October 1805, Villeneuve received a letter from the naval minister Decrès informing him that Rosily had arrived in Madrid with orders to take over the Cádiz command and advising "Break out, beat the enemy, and all will be righted". Stung by the prospect of being disgraced before the fleet, Villeneuve resolved to go to sea before his successor could reach Cádiz. However, this break-out ended in disaster at Trafalgar and then in a storm which wrecked yet more of the fleet, and so when Rosily arrived in Cádiz after the battle he found only five French ships of the line remaining rather than the 18 he was expecting. (Note: These five ships were Algésiras, Pluton, Argonaute, Neptune and Héros.) Such damage proved irreparable and though Rosily was able to make the surviving small fleet ready for sea, he remained blockaded in Cadiz by the British for two-and-a-half years until Napoleon's invasion of Spain in 1808 and the outbreak of the Peninsular War.

On 26 May 1808 the British fleet manoeuvred to force the Bay of Cádiz and, at the same moment, the citizens of Cádiz heard of the political events in the rest of the Iberian peninsula and rose up against the French. Adding to Rosily's problems, the six Spanish vessels remaining in the combined fleet departed and on 9 and 10 June fired over 1,200 shot on the French ships. On 11 June Rosily made preparations to pass between the Spanish and British fleets, but contrary winds kept him in port. The citizens of Cádiz threatened to kill any Frenchmen remaining onshore, Rosily had no news of the arrival of the relief fleet he had been promised would arrive on 7 June and advance of general Dupont's army to relieve Rosily by land had been held up (and was finally defeated at Bailén on 18/19 July). On 14 June, Rosily entered into negotiations with the Spanish general Thomas de Morla. Rosily's ships were seized for use against the French and only Rosily and his chief of staff were then allowed to return to France, where he went to resume his duties as director of the dépôt de la marine.

=== 1809 to death ===
In 1809, he was made comte de l'Empire and a member of the council of enquiry set up to examine the conduct of Victor Hugues, the commissioner in command of French Guiana, who was accused of surrendering without a fight. He replaced Bougainville at the bureau des longitudes on 28 October 1811. Also in 1811 he was made president of the council on naval architecture and in 1813 he, Tarbé (inspector of bridges and roads) and Beautemps-Beaupré were commanded to choose the site for a new naval arsenal at the mouth of the Elbe. It was under his leadership that the corps of hydrographic engineers was given its first definitive structure (in 1814) and began surveying the coast of France (in 1816). On 25 July 1816 Louis XVIII made him a grand officer of the Legion of Honour, granting him the "grand cordon" of the order the following 27 December. Also in 1816, on 26 May, he was made a free associate of the Académie des sciences. He was made president of the electoral college of Finistère on 26 September 1818 and, despite having little success in that role, was made Commander of the Order of Saint Louis on 21 October 1818 and Grand Cross of that order on 17 August 1822. He finally retired in 1827 and, to show how he valued his services, the king granted him the title of honorary director general of the dépôt de la marine. Having also been awarded the Grand Cross of the Danish Order of the Dannebrog (date unknown), he died in 1832.
