= Marjolin's ulcer =

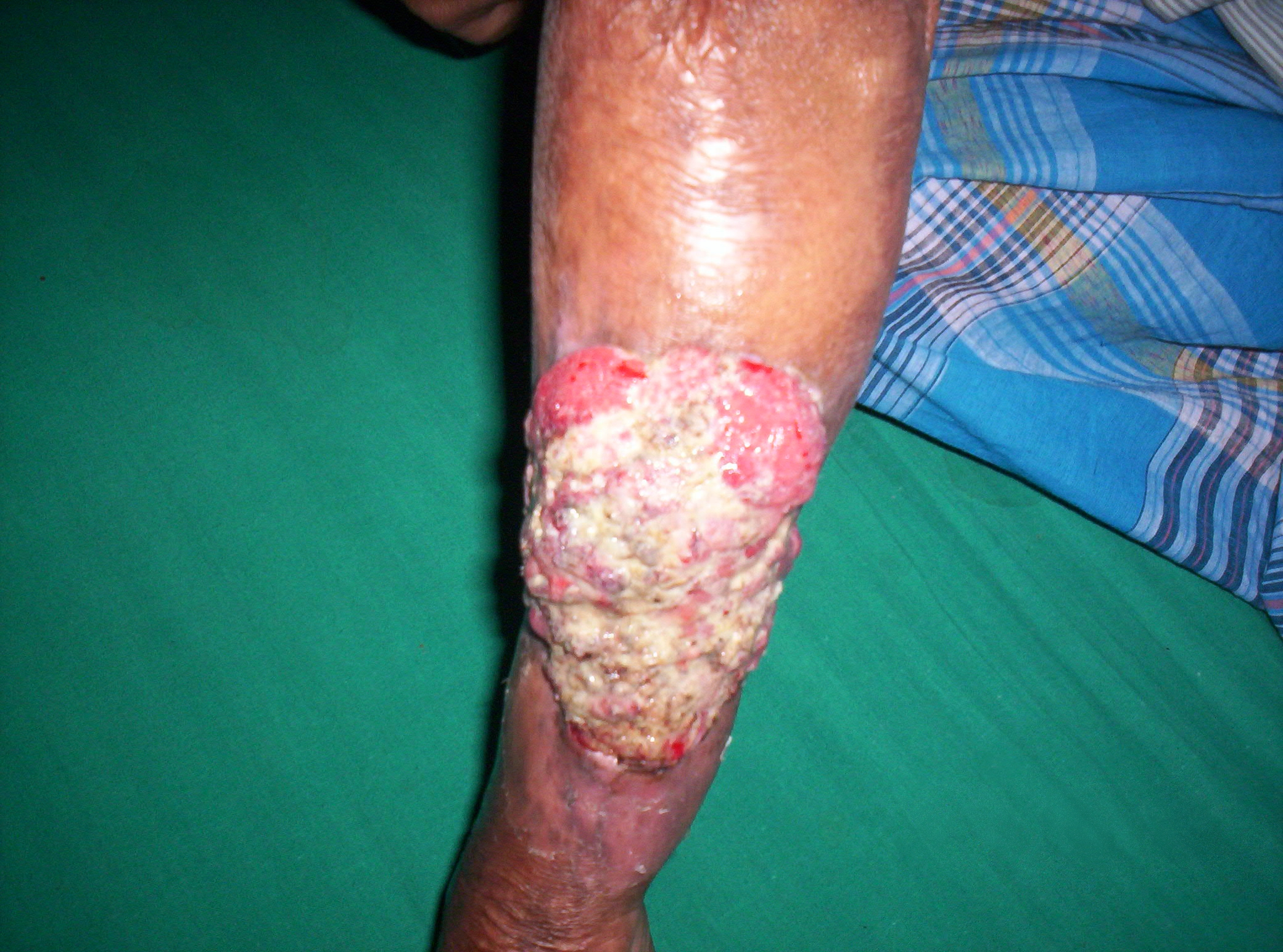
- Marjolin's ulcer presenting on arm following a burn
- Specialty: Oncology, surgery

Marjolin's ulcer refers to an aggressive ulcerating squamous cell carcinoma presenting in an area of previously traumatized, chronically inflamed, or scarred skin. They are commonly present in the context of chronic wounds including burn injuries, varicose veins, venous ulcers, ulcers from osteomyelitis, and post radiotherapy scars.

The term was named after French surgeon, Jean-Nicolas Marjolin, who first described the condition in 1828. The term was later coined by J C De Costa.

== Presentation ==
Slow growth, painlessness (as the ulcer is usually not associated with nerve tissue), and absence of lymphatic spread due to local destruction of lymphatic channels.

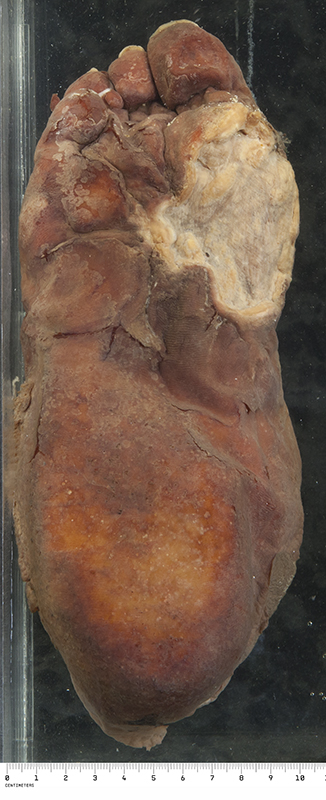
Museum specimen of Marjolin's' ulcer on the sole of a foot

== Histology ==
Histologically, the tumour is a well-differentiated squamous cell carcinoma. This carcinoma is aggressive in nature, spreads locally and is associated with a poor prognosis. The cancer has a 18-38% rate of metastasis. 40% occur on the lower limb and the malignant change is usually painless. This malignant change of the wound happens a long time after initial trauma, usually 10–25 years later. Its edge is everted and not always raised. More recent transcriptional analysis suggests that chronically impeded extracellular matrix turnover and epithelium-to-mesenchyme transitions in neglected scar tissue might give rise to this malignancy.

== Diagnosis ==
Wedge biopsy is the favored method of diagnosis. Tissue specimens obtained should be taken from both the centre and margin of lesion, as the central ulcerated deposits may be necrotic.

== Treatment ==
Treatment is usually surgical, with a wide excision of the lesion; typically a 1 cm margin all around is required.

== See also ==
- Saree cancer
