= Jean-Nicolas Trouille =

Jean-Nicolas Trouille (1750–1825) was a French politician, architect and military engineer.

== Life ==
After a short career in the cavalry (which he left due to a duel) then in the naval artillery in Brest, he was taken on by Antoine Choquet de Lindu as a draughtsman in 1777 thanks to his qualifications as an architect. In 1791 he succeeded Choquet de Lindu as director of the maritime works at Brest, a post he held until 1796.

In 1795, he was elected as a député to the Council of Five Hundred and there specialised in questions relating to the French Navy. In 1798 he was made guardian of the palace of Versailles, which some people wanted to demolish in order to re-use the stone but which Trouille instead proposed should house a number of artistic or administrative establishments. At the end of the Revolutionary period, he returned to Brest, rejoined the maritime works in 1800 and became their director again from 1814 to 1821. Among his surviving works are the Bâtiment aux Lions in the Brest Arsenal (1807–09) and the levelling of Île des Morts to build powder magazines there (1808).
