= Landévennec Group =

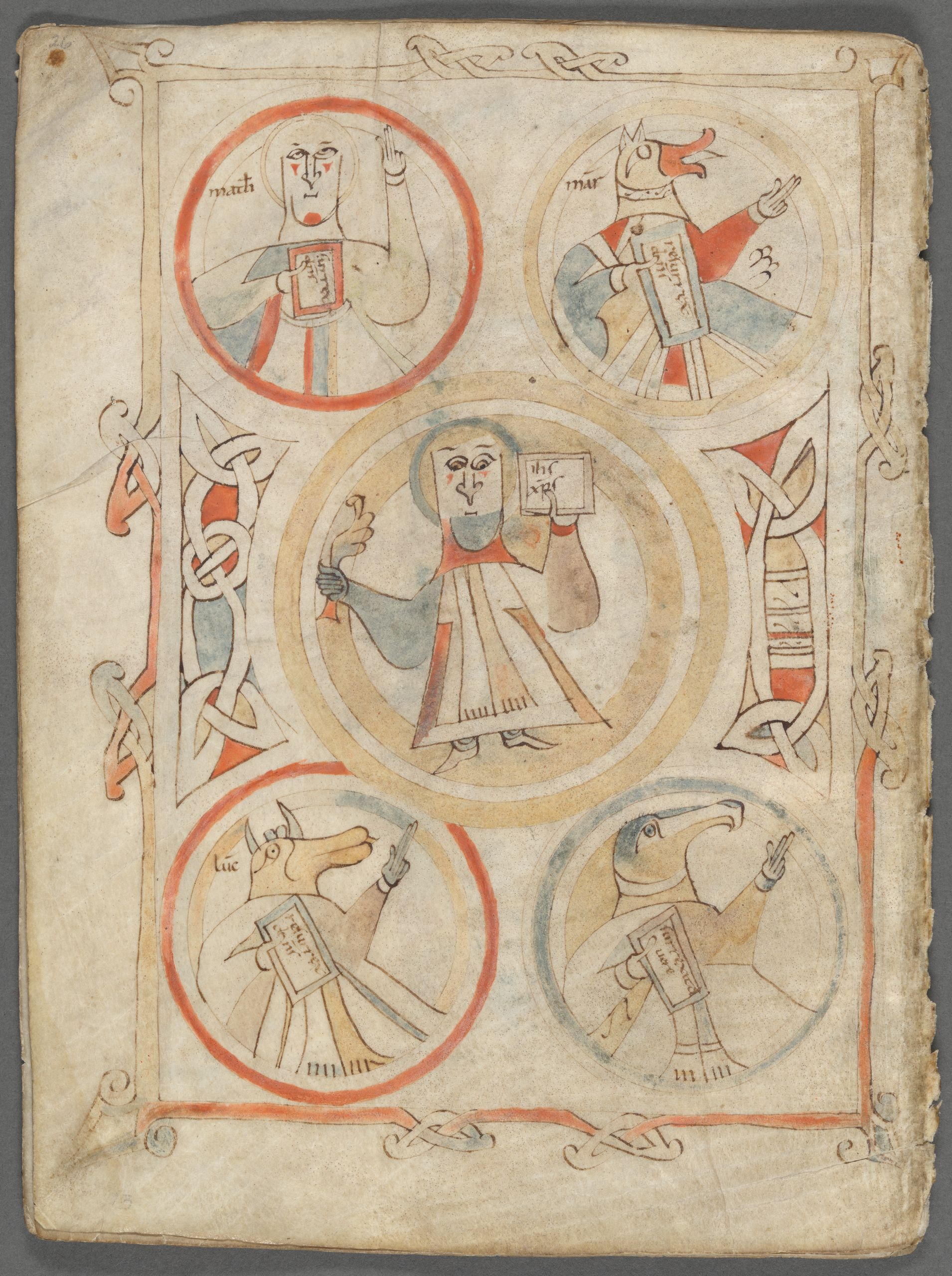
The four evangelists, from the Harkness Gospels (New York, New York Public Library, MA 115/MssCol 2557, fol.13v)

The Landévennec Group is a group of 9th to 11th century illuminated manuscripts of the Four Evangelists from Basse-Bretagne, probably all from the scriptorium of Landévennec Abbey. Influenced by insular art, they are marked by their representation of the evangelists as humans with animal heads.

== List ==
- British Library, Breton Gospel Book (British Library, MS Egerton 609): provenance from Marmoutier Abbey, Tours, entered the British Museum in 1836
- Bern, Burgerbibliothek, MS 85: dating to 850-900, once belonged to Fleury Abbey
- Boulogne-sur-Mer, Bibliothèque municipale, MS 8: dating to 850-900, brought by monks fleeing from Landévennec after its destruction by the Vikings in 913, who settled in Montreuil-sur-Mer
- Troyes, Médiathèque, MS 960: dating to 909, Gospels, known as the Saint-Gildas-de-Ruys Gospels
- Oxford, Bodleian Library, Auct. D. 2. 16: dating to 900-950, given to Exeter Cathedral by bishop Leofric.
- New York Public Library, Harkness Gospels, MS 115: dating to 890-910, named after its former owner, who donated his book collection to the New York Public Library in 1928, with two other more classical Romanesque miniatures added in the 11th century.

== Sources ==
- Evangéliaires carolingiens de Bretagne
- René Crozet, Les représentations anthropo-zoomorphiques des évangélistes dans l'enluminure et dans la peinture murale aux époques carolingienne et romane, vol. 1e année, avril-juin 1958, pages 182-187, chap. n° 2
- Jonathan J. C. Alexander, « La résistance à la domination culturelle carolingienne dans l'art breton du IXe siècle: le témoignage de l'enluminure des manuscrits », dans Landévennec et le monachisme breton du haut Moyen Âge, Actes du colloque du XVe centenaire de l'abbaye, 1985, p. 269-280
- Louis Lemoine, « Le Scriptorium de Landévennec et les représentations de saint Marc », dans Mélanges François Kerlouégan, Presses universitaires de Franche-Comté, 1994 (ISBN 9782251605159), p. 363-380
