= Antoine Choquet de Lindu =

Antoine Choquet de Lindu (7 November 1712, in Brest – 7 October 1790, in Brest) was a French architect and military engineer in the service of the French Navy.

== Life ==
Choquet de Lindu was born in Brest on 7 November 1712, into a family of administrators. Entering the Navy as a clerk, like his father, he executed a very large number of very important buildings at Brest, well known for their solidity if not for their elegance and so perfectly fitted to their purpose. Made sous-ingénieur in 1743, he then became chief engineer in 1746. From 1764 to 1767, the Ministry of the Navy and the Ministry for War were merged, and Choquet de Lindu was attached to the royal corps of engineers, with a commission as an infantry captain (though he was kept on as director of the maritime works of the port of Brest, under Amédée-François Frézier).

Between 1743 and his retirement in 1784, Choquet de Lindu was chief engineer of the royal navy. In this role, he devoted himself to the rebuilding and expansion of the port of Brest, producing "works of all kinds" – barracks, hospitals, magazines, dry docks, shipyards, theatres, prisons, sail and rope factories, dams and docks. It has been calculated that the buildings built by him over his whole career have a total area of 4,400 square metres. His main works were a Jesuit chapel attached to the hôpital Saint-Louis, the Brest prison and the three basins of Pontaniou (work on which he restarted in 1751, completing them in 1757).

== Works ==
=== Buildings ===
(List drawn from )

- 1738–1744 : Four Bordenave shipbuilding docks
- 1740 : Chapel of the Jesuit seminary, known as the chapelle de la marine
- 1740 : Naval forges
- 1740 : Second prison of Pontaniou
- 1740 : Bakery, washroom, laundry and offices of the navy hospital
- 1740 : Iron and carpentry store
- 1744–1745 : General magazine
- 1745–1747 : High ropewalk
- 1747 : Lead, locks, iron and tar store.
- 1747 : Shooting range on the quai aux vivres
- 1747 : Five-furnace bakery on Parc aux vivres
- 1747 : Expansion of the provision bakery on the lower ropewalk
- 1750–1751 : Brest prison, closure of the Arsenal of Brest
- 1751–1757 : Formes or basins of Pontaniou
- 1753 : Fountain on Quai de la Corderie
- 1753 : Masts store
- 1756–1761 : Barrack-block in quartier de la marine
- 1763–1764 : Second mole at Pontaniou
- 1766 : Théâtre de la marine – built in 8 months, with a favourable acoustic and good sight-lines throughout
- 1766–1767 : Matelot barrack-block (second depot) up to the first floor
- 1766 : Upgrade of the mast-machine
- 1768–1769 : Iron-store along the first Pontaniou basin
- 1768–1770 : Four-furnace bakery
- 1769 : Fountain on quai de Kéravel
- 1770–1771 : Two mast hangars at Le Salou
- 1775 : Cover over the third Pontaniou basin
- 1777–1779 : Barracks behind the hospital
- 1780 : Pontanézen hospital
- the theatre in Brest

He also completed projects outside the port of Brest :

- 1756 : port of La Hague
- 1772 : shipyard at Landevennec, on the Châteaulin river.
- the tower of the phare du Stiff on the island of Ouessant

=== Writings ===
He wrote the "bagne" ("prison") article in Diderot's Encyclopédie, and was appointed as a member of the académie de marine in 1752. He published two works:

- 1757 : La Description des trois formes du port de Brest
- 1759 : La Description du bagne de l'arsenal de Brest
