= Rosnoën =

Rosnoën Rosloc'hen
- Commune
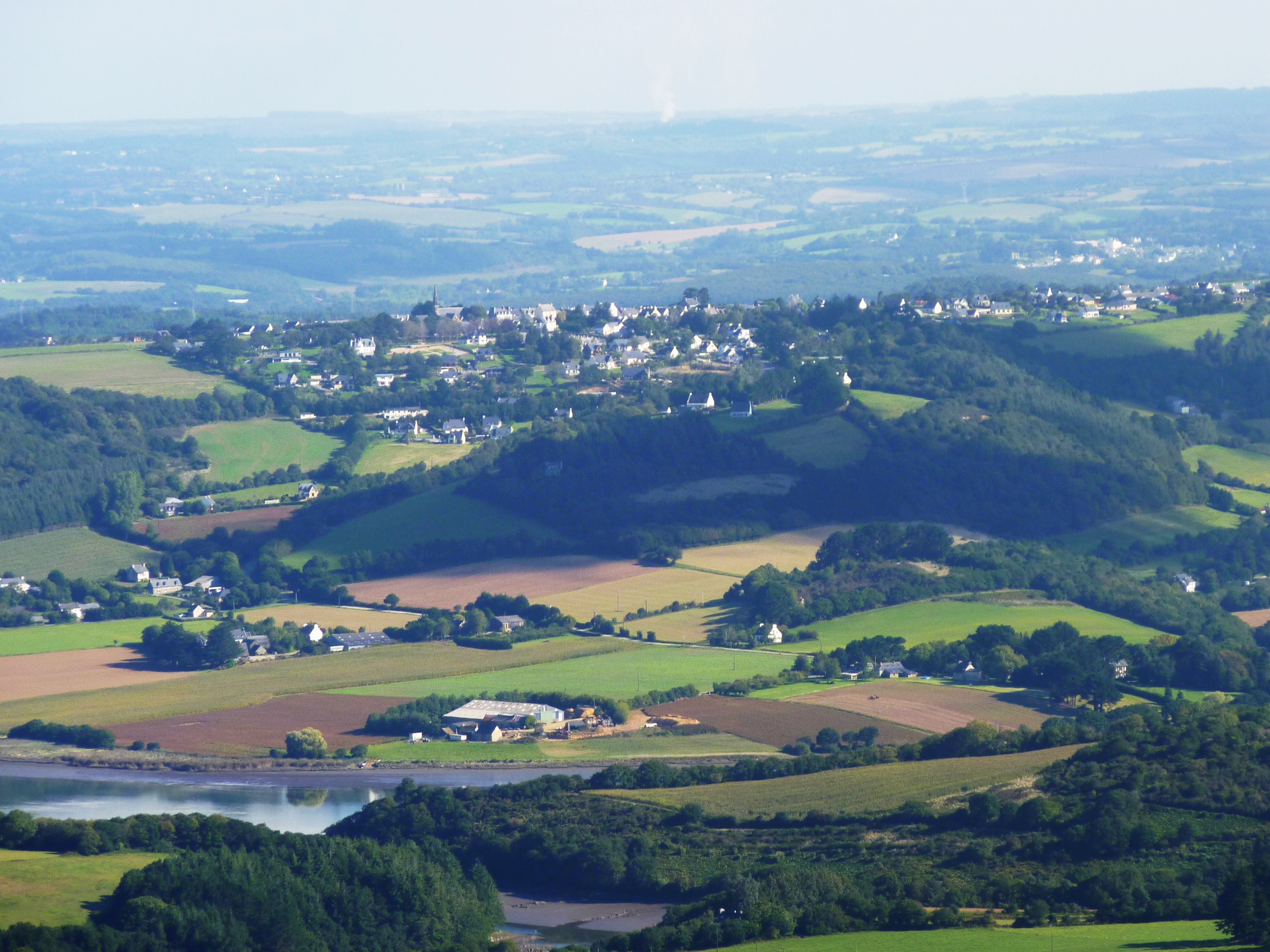
- Rosnoën seen from the summit of Ménez-Hom, with the Aulne river in the foreground
- Location of Rosnoën
- Location within France Location within Brittany
- Coordinates: 48°15′51″N 4°11′36″W
- Country: France
- Region: Brittany
- Department: Finistère
- Arrondissement: Châteaulin
- Canton: Pont-de-Buis-lès-Quimerch

Government
  - Mayor (2020–2026): Mickaël Kernéis
- Area^{1}: 33.70 km^{2} (13.01 sq mi)
- Highest elevation: 167 m (548 ft)
- Lowest elevation: 0 m (0 ft)
- Population (2023): 1,012
  - Density: 30.03/km^{2} (77.78/sq mi)
- Time zone: UTC+01:00 (CET)
  - Summer (DST): UTC+02:00 (CEST)
- INSEE/Postal code: 29240 /29590
- ^{1} French Land Register data, which excludes lakes, ponds, glaciers > 1 km^{2} (0.386 sq mi or 247 acres) and river estuaries.

Rosnoën (French pronunciation: [ʁɔsnɔɛn]; Breton: Rosloc'hen) is a commune in the Finistère department of Brittany in north-western France.

== Population ==
Historical population
Year	Pop.	±% p.a.
1968	812	—
1975	725	−1.61%
1982	692	−0.66%
1990	802	+1.86%
1999	835	+0.45%
2007	960	+1.76%
2012	961	+0.02%
2017	955	−0.13%
2023	1,012	+0.97%
Source: INSEE

Inhabitants of Rosnoën are called in French Rosnoënais.

== Geography ==
Rosnoën is located 26 km (16 mi) southeast of Brest. The village occupies a peninsula between the mouths or the Aulne river and Faou river. Térénez bridge is located between Rosnoën and Landévennec. The bridge crosses the mouth of the Aulne river, connecting Crozon Peninsula to Brittany.

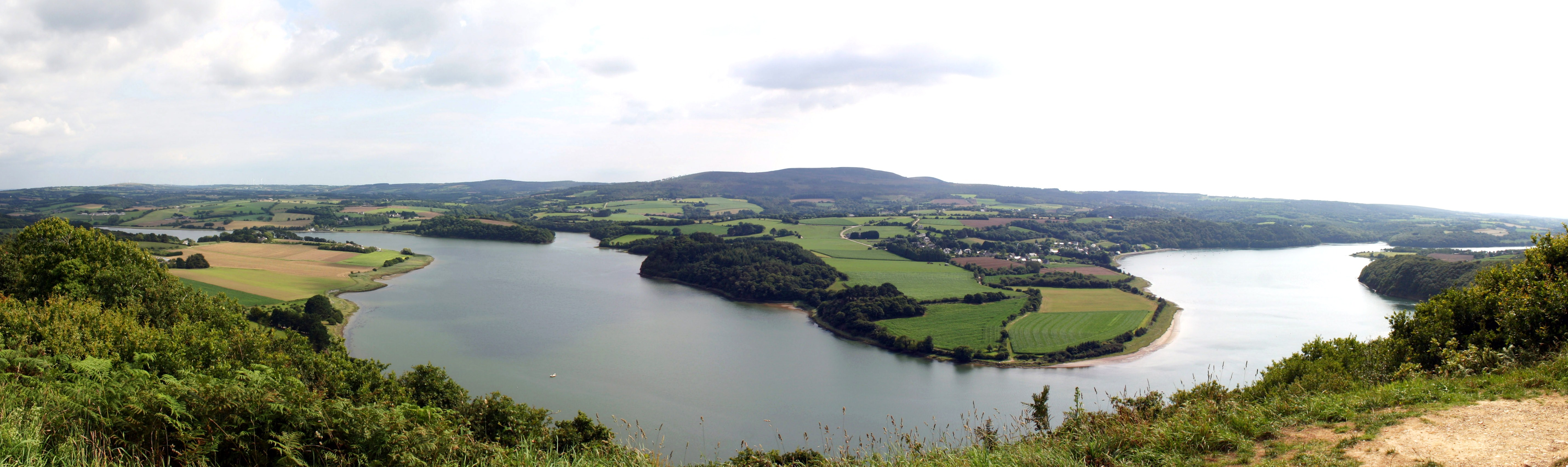
Panoramic view from the belvedere of Rosnoën on the Aulne river and the Crozon Peninsula.

== Map ==
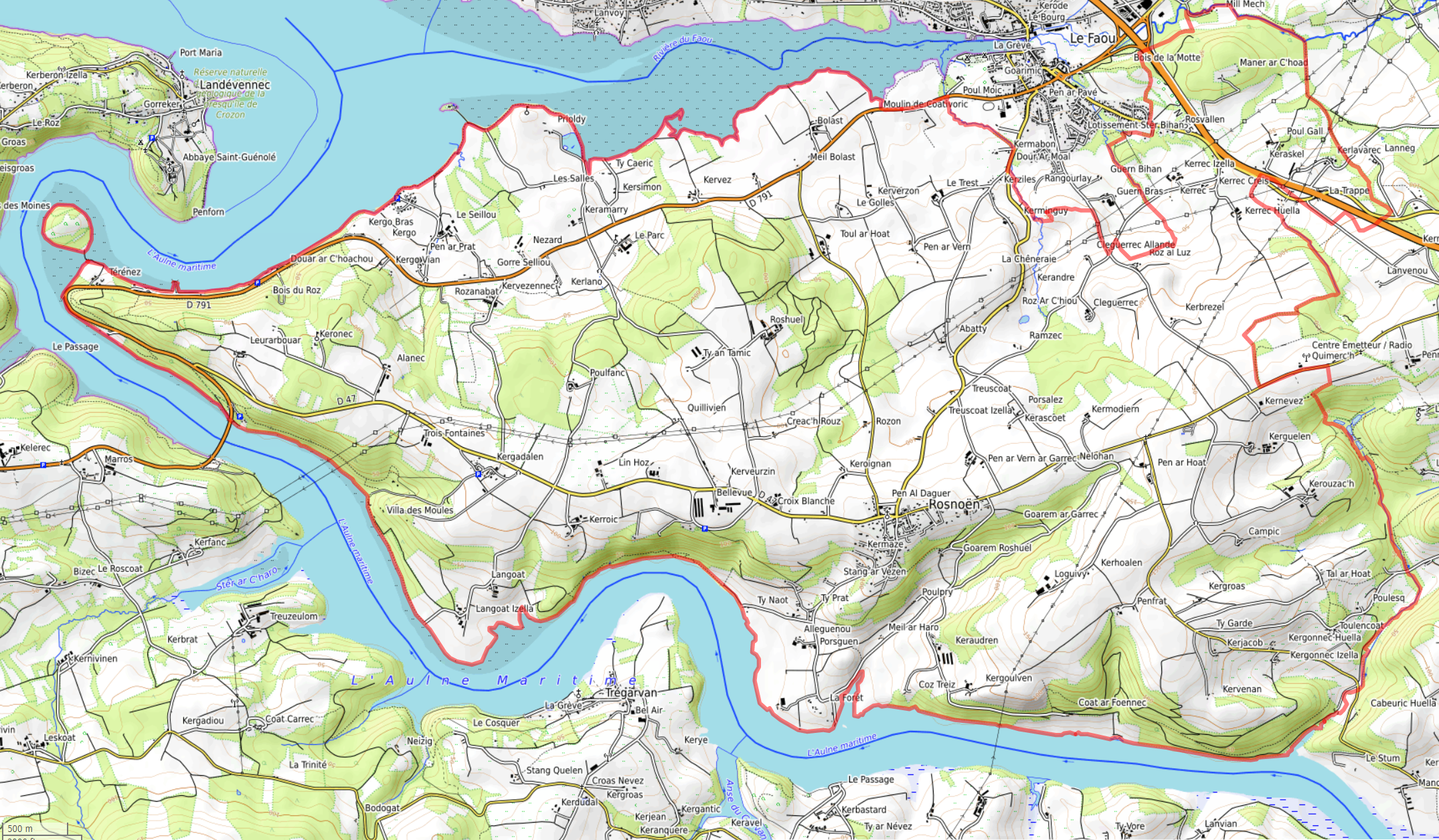
Topographic map

== See also ==
- Communes of the Finistère department
- Parc naturel régional d'Armorique
