= Defence Infrastructure Service =

French government body

The Defence Infrastructure Service (Service d'Infrastructure de la Défense or SID) is a French government agency established in 2005. It comprises 6,500 military and civilian personnel who maintain infrastructure belonging to the Ministry of Defence. Around 500 recruits join the service each year. In 2025, in recognition of its 20-year anniversary, the unit took part in the Bastille Day military parade for the first time.

It merged the three former entities in charge of Ministry of Defence buildings and properties:

- Central Engineers' Directorate, or Direction Centrale du Génie (Armée de Terre),
- Central Air Infrastructure Directorate, or Direction Centrale de l'Infrastructure de l'Air (Armée de l'Air)
- Central Directorate of Maritime Properties and Works, or Direction Centrale des Travaux Immobiliers et Maritimes (Marine nationale).
