= Île Longue =

French peninsula and submarine base in Brittany

Coordinates: 48°18′23″N 4°30′24″W

Approximate layout of the installations

Île Longue (French pronunciation: [il lɔ̃ɡ]; French for "Long Island"; Breton: Enez-Hir) is a peninsula of the roadstead of Brest in the department of Finistère in the Brittany region. It is the base of the French nuclear ballistic missile submarines (French: sous-marin nucléaire lanceur d'engins, SNLE), and as such one of the most secretive and heavily defended places in France.

== Geography ==
Île Longue is a peninsula on the commune of Crozon, attached to the Crozon peninsula. its altitude is 42 metres (138 ft) and has an area of 1.10 square kilometres (0.42 sq mi). To the north of the peninsula there are two small islands: Ile des Morts and Ile Trébéron.

Originally the isthmus was a mere sand bank, and crossing was only possible at low tide. During the 19th century, it was improved with a stone pathway. During the construction of the strategic base (1967–1972), it was widened, made insubmersible, and changed into a big parking space.

The peninsula is a stone plateau surrounded by cliffs. It harbours several water springs, which made human habitat possible. In the 19th century, three villages were built on the peninsula: Kernalleguen (less than a kilometre of the isthmus), Kermeur (1.5 km, 0.93 mi of the isthmus) and Bothuelc'h, slightly north.

== History ==
=== Description of the peninsula in 1895 ===
L'Île Longue a près de deux kilomètres de longueur sur moins d'un kilomètre de largeur. C'est un haut plateau de cultures où des terres très fertiles produisent des céréales et des légumes abondants. De grands champs de choux et des prairies révèlent un bétail assez nombreux. Mais les hameaux sont misérables et la route qui relie entre eux Bot-Huelch, Kermeur et Kernaliguen est un fossé boueux, presque impraticable. La plupart des habitants travaillent sur la côte occidentale de l'île où d'immenses carrières de pavés ont été créées, elles emploient 200 ouvriers et produisent de grandes quantités de cubes de pierre, employés dans toute la Bretagne et jusqu'à Paris. Au sud, l'île est fermée par un retranchement bastionné appelé le « mur », une porte donne accès sur la grève que traverse le chemin du Fret.

—

Ile Longue is almost two kilometres long and less than one kilometre wide. It is a high plateau used for agriculture, where fertile lands produce abundant grains and vegetables. Large cabbage fields and meadows support ample livestock. But the villages are poor and the road that connects Bot-Huelch, Kermeur and Kernaliguen is a muddy, almost impassable ditch. Most of the people work on the west coast of the island where enormous paving-stone quarries were created; they employ 200 workers and produce large quantities of stone blocks, used throughout Brittany and as far as Paris. To the south, the island is closed off by a fortified entrenchment called the "wall"; a gate provides access to the beach that is traversed by Du Fret Road.

=== Quarries ===
Exploitation of porphyry started in the 18th century. By the end of the 19th century, half a million cobblestones were produced each year. Up to eleven quarries were exploited around the peninsula. The largest, Vengleuz Braz, was located west from Kermeur.

=== Fortifications ===
With its cliffs, local water resources, isthmus crossable only at low tide and its location defending Brest harbour, Île Longue is an easily defendable, strategic location. It was fortified by Vauban and Dajot as to render the roadstead impossible to hold by an enemy fleet and to allow a counter-attack against an enemy landing party attempting to seize Quélern.

Dajot had a fort constructed at the top of the peninsula around 1776. It featured a hemicircular lower battery with small buildings protected by a ditch, with a bastion and a drawbridge.

In 1879, a wall was built south of the peninsula, as to defend it against the land. It featured a drawbridge defended by a casemate and two bastions. Remains of the main gate and of the casemate still exist, but are enclosed in the military area, and not accessible to the general public.

=== First World War ===
From 1914 to 1919, Île Longue was used as an internment camp for German citizens captured after the seizure of the ship Nieuw Amsterdam, intercepted by the French 2nd Light Squadron on 2 September 1914. From 3–23 September, the 1,500 passengers were interned at Crozon fort and at Brest; from 4 November, they were transferred to a camp built on Île Longue for the occasion. The last prisoners were released on 31 December 1919.

=== Second World War ===
During the occupation, the Germans used Île Longue as an anti-aircraft battery, which remained active until 1944. Megalithic monuments were destroyed by the construction of bunkers.

== Île Longue strategic submarine base ==
Three zones of the base

In 1965, President Charles de Gaulle chose Île Longue as home for the sea-based component of the Force de frappe. The place was chosen because it was close to a large harbour, yet distant enough to stay out of the public's eye, and was easily controlled and defended. Île Longue is the command centre for France's ballistic missile submarines.

Work began in 1967 and took five years. The peninsula was completely changed, as the isthmus was widened and consolidated, and the peninsula itself gained 30 hectares (74 acres). Two dry docks were built, as well as numerous habitation, engineering and defence buildings, and approximately 24 vertical missile silos. Missiles are assembled just south of the base, at the Guenvénez Missile Storage and Maintenance Area.

In 1972, the base was made operational and the French submarine Redoutable departed for her first patrol. Île Longue has been the base of the ballistic missile submarines of the Force Océanique Stratégique ever since. Maintenance of the submarines is done at Île Longue, as well as storage of the nuclear components (warheads and fuel bars). Chemical pyrotechnics for the missiles and conventional warheads are stored in Guenvénez, 4 km away.

The base is divided into three colour-coded zones:

- Zone Blue comprises the security installations and personnel, including the fire department and the Fusiliers Marins responsible for the defence of the site. This zone also comprises offices and catering.
- Zone Red encompasses the pyrotechnics and bunkers to hold nuclear warheads.
- Zone Yellow encompasses the harbour and submarine installations, notably two roofed 200-metre (660 ft)-long docks. A 170-metre (560 ft)-long bunker between the two docks is used to load and unload nuclear materials.

Since 2006, work has been undertaken at Île Longue to prepare the base for the new M51 submarine-launched ballistic missile.

== Bibliography ==
- Maël Prigent, Ile longue. Regards discrets, 2008
