= Landévennec Abbey =

Abbey in Finistère, France

Coordinates: 48°17′25″N 4°16′0″W

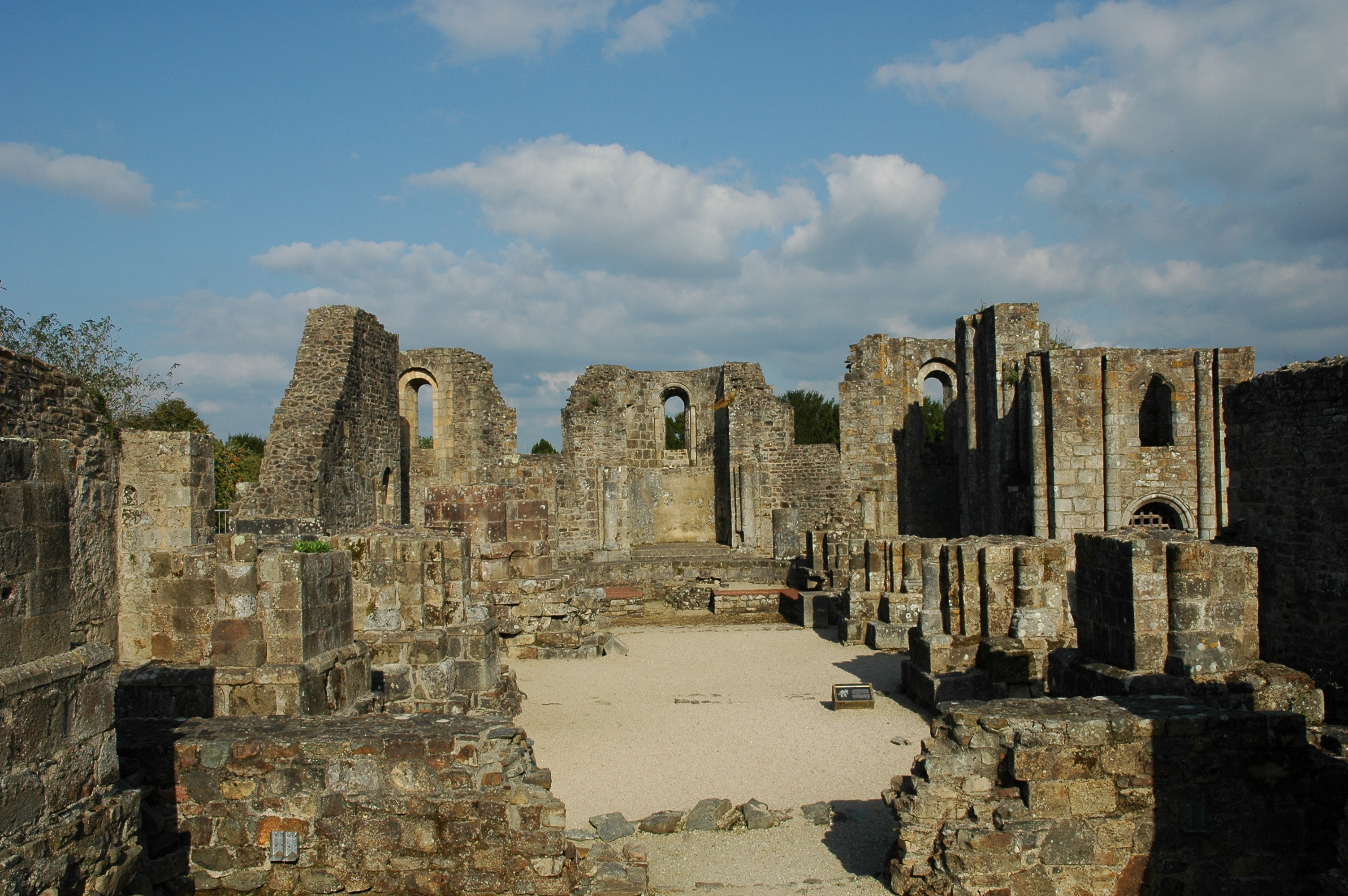
Ruins of the medieval Landévennec Abbey

Landévennec Abbey (French: Abbaye de Landévennec, Abbaye Saint-Guénolé de Landévennec) is a Benedictine monastery at Landévennec in Brittany, in the department of Finistère, France. The present monastery is a modern foundation at the site of an early mediaeval monastery, of which only ruins survive.

== First foundation ==
The abbey is traditionally held to have been founded around 490 by Saint Winwaloe (French: Guénolé). It became a Benedictine house in the eighth century. It was attacked and burned by Vikings in 913 and was subsequently rebuilt in stone.

The abbey was suppressed in 1793 during the French Revolution and the goods and premises were sold off.

== Second foundation ==
In 1950 the site was bought by the Benedictine community of Kerbénéat, who built new premises. The community formed part of the Subiaco Congregation, since 2013 the Subiaco Cassinese Congregation.

== See also ==
- List of Carolingian monasteries
- Carolingian architecture
- Gwenhael
- St Tudy
- Landévennec Group

== Sources ==
- Website of Landévennec Abbey (in French)
