= Jean Bernard Tarbé de Vauxclairs =

Jean Bernard Tarbé de Vauxclairs (23 February 1767 in Sens – 17 September 1842 in Paris) was a French engineer. He was made a Commander of the Légion d'honneur.

In August 1792, he was arrested with Antoine Barnave, Bertrand, Alexandre-Théodore-Victor, comte de Lameth, Louis Lebègue Duportail, and Marguerite-Louis-François Duport-Dutertre.

== Works ==
- Dictionary of public works, military and maritime, considered in dealing with legislation, administration and jurisprudence (Paris, Carillian Goeury, 1835).
