= Jean-Nicolas Marjolin =

French surgeon and pathologist

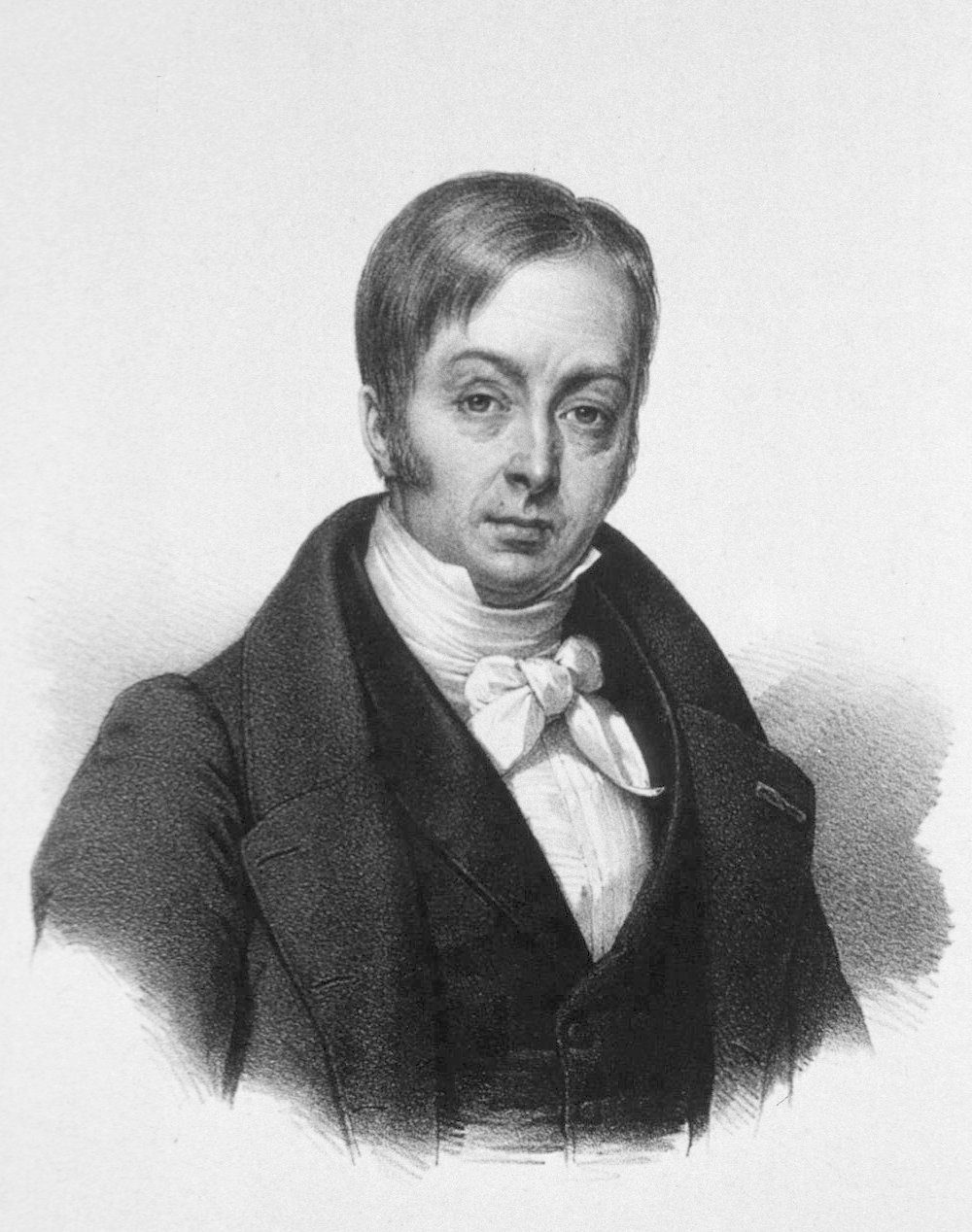
Jean-Nicolas Marjolin

Jean-Nicolas Marjolin (6 December 1780 – 4 March 1850) was a French surgeon and pathologist born in Ray-sur-Saône, Haute-Saône. His name is associated with a malady known as Marjolin's ulcer.

After a brief stint in the French military, he attached himself to a physician, a friend of the family who allowed Marjolin to attend Commercy Hospital as a student. In 1800 he relocated to Paris with a letter of recommendation from Alexis Boyer (1757–1833). Here he became a favoured disciple of Guillaume Dupuytren (1777–1835).

In 1803 he gained his internship, followed by promotions as an anatomy assistant (1805) and prosector (1806). In 1808 he earned his medical doctorate, and two years later opened an amphitheater on Rue des Rats (today- Rue Colbert). Here he taught classes that numbered more than 200 pupils. In 1816 he was appointed second surgeon at the Hôtel-Dieu de Paris with Dupuytren as departmental head. By this time Marjolin's relationship with Dupuytren had soured, eventually leading to bitter hatred between the two men.

In 1818 he was chosen professor of external pathology ahead of esteemed candidates that included Philibert Joseph Roux (1780–1854), Dominique Larrey (1766–1842) and Jules Germain Cloquet (1790–1883). For the next thirty two years he maintained the chair of external pathology. His final days were spent in retirement at Clichy, where he pursued his hobby attending to trees and flowers.

In 1820 he became a member of the Académie de Médecine, and in 1830 was chosen consultant surgeon to Louis-Philippe. His son, René, married Cornelia Scheffer, daughter of painter Ary Scheffer (1795–1858).

== Publications ==
- Manuel d'Anatomie (1815); a manual for his students to assist them with dissections.
- Cours de Pathlogie Chirurgicale (1837), one volume
- contributed over thirty articles to the Nouveau Dictionnaire Médical (1821)
