= Landévennec =

Landévennec Landevenneg
- Commune
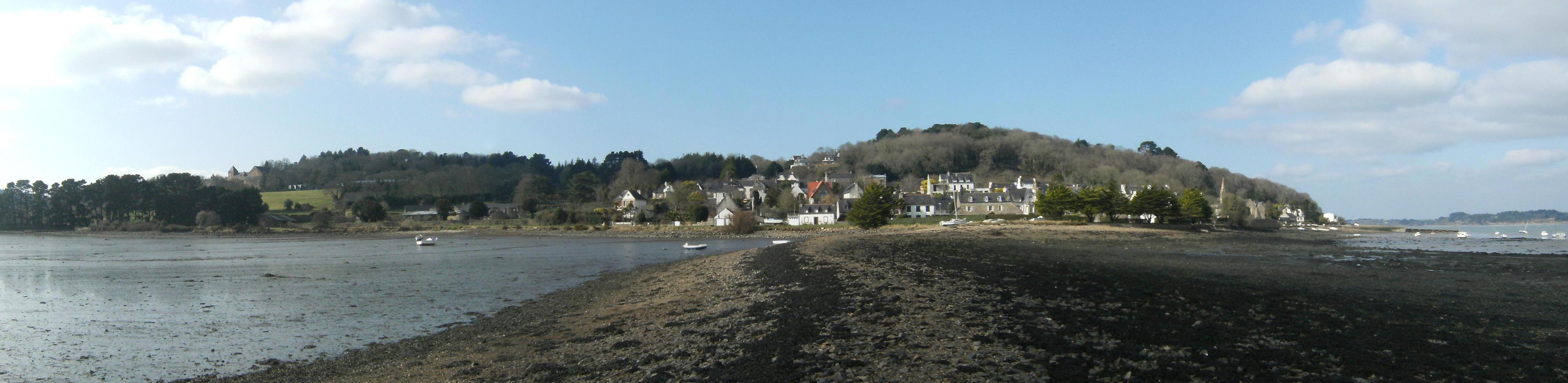
- A panorama of the waterfront at Landévennec

- Coat of arms
- Location of Landévennec
- Location within France Location within Brittany
- Coordinates: 48°17′32″N 4°15′53″W
- Country: France
- Region: Brittany
- Department: Finistère
- Arrondissement: Châteaulin
- Canton: Crozon
- Intercommunality: Presqu'île de Crozon-Aulne maritime

Government
  - Mayor (2020–2026): Roger Lars
- Area^{1}: 13.83 km^{2} (5.34 sq mi)
- Highest elevation: 116 m (381 ft)
- Lowest elevation: 0 m (0 ft)
- Population (2023): 330
  - Density: 24/km^{2} (62/sq mi)
- Time zone: UTC+01:00 (CET)
  - Summer (DST): UTC+02:00 (CEST)
- INSEE/Postal code: 29104 /29560
- ^{1} French Land Register data, which excludes lakes, ponds, glaciers > 1 km^{2} (0.386 sq mi or 247 acres) and river estuaries.

Landévennec (French pronunciation: [lɑ̃devɛnɛk]; Breton: Landevenneg) is a commune in the Finistère department of Brittany in north-western France.

== Population ==
Historical population
Year	Pop.	±% p.a.
1968	523	—
1975	423	−2.99%
1982	377	−1.63%
1990	374	−0.10%
1999	371	−0.09%
2007	350	−0.73%
2012	344	−0.35%
2017	337	−0.41%
2023	330	−0.35%
Source: INSEE

== Geography ==
Landévennec is located on the Crozon peninsula, 19.5 km (12.1 mi) southeast of Brest. The river Aulne forms a natural boundary to the east.

== Map ==
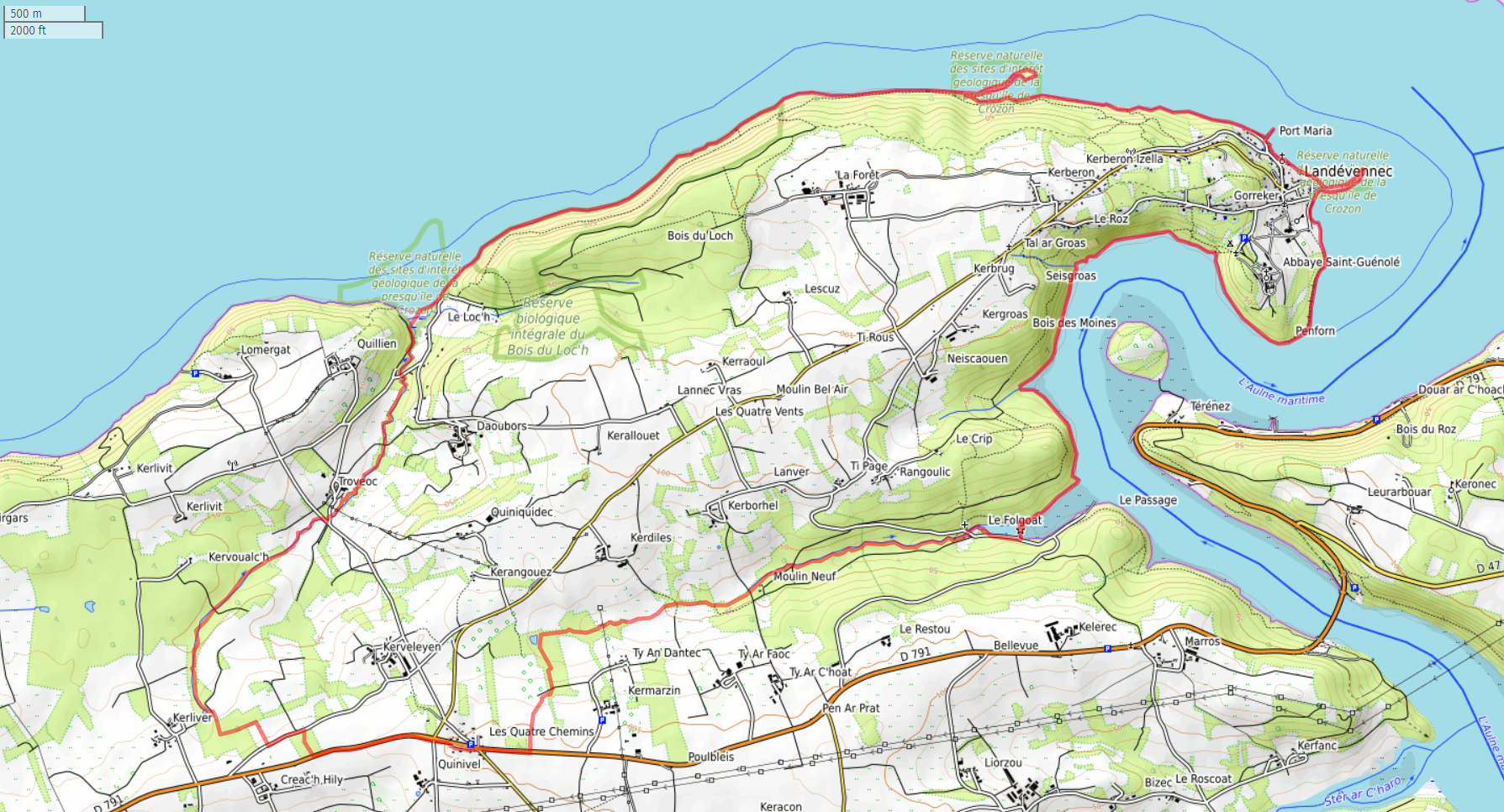
Topographic map.

== Sights ==
=== Landévennec Abbey ===
Landévennec Abbey lies in the commune.

=== Ship graveyard ===
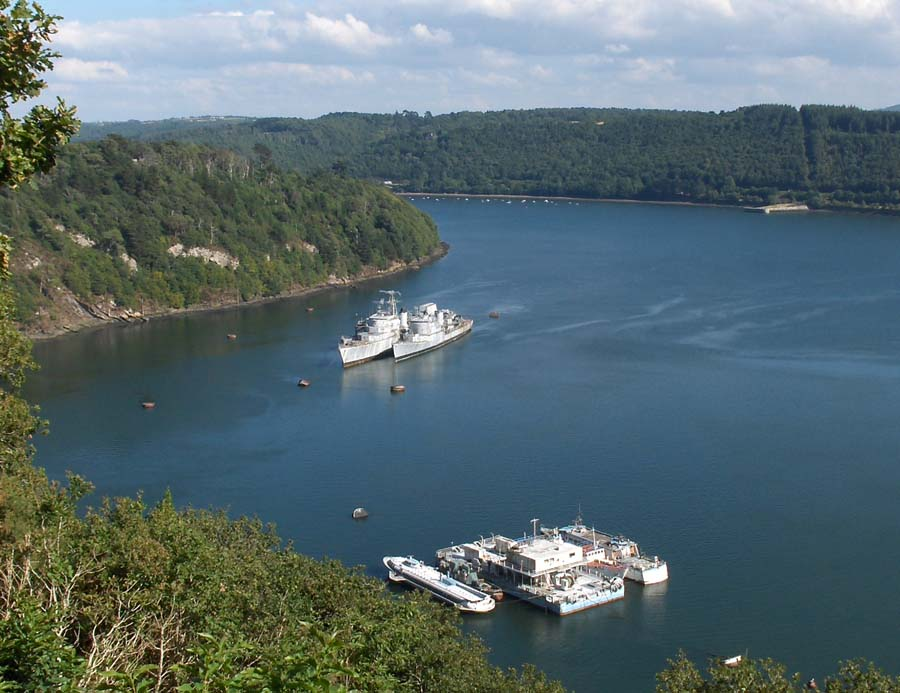
Landévennec, August 2006. In the background are two former escort avisos previously used as breakwaters at Brest, and in the left foreground is the Kometa.

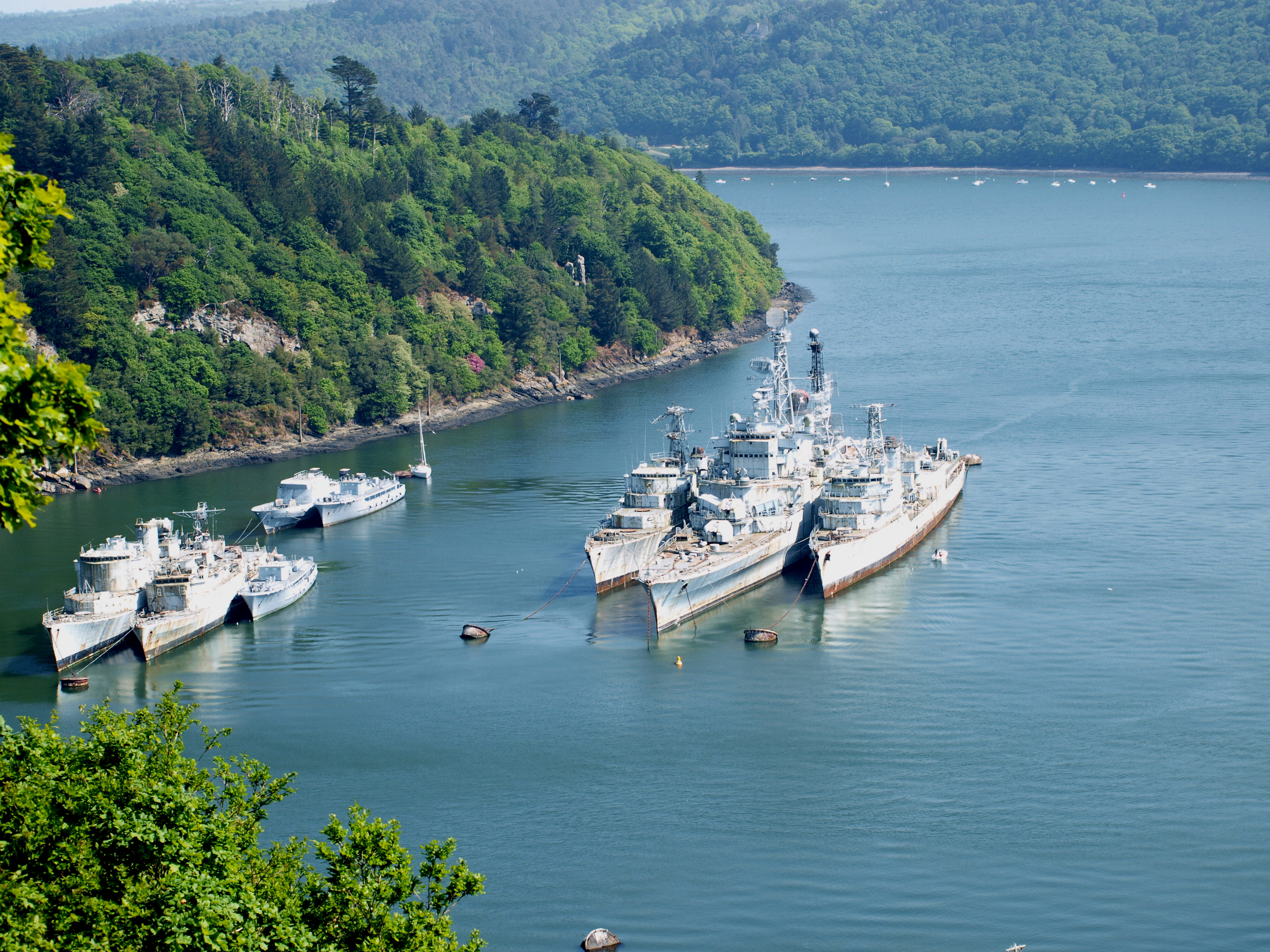
The old cruiser Colbert was the largest ship at the graveyard

Shortly before entering the roadstead of Brest, the river Aulne forms a bend around the Île de Térénez then the pointe de Pen Forn near Landévennec, where there is a 10 m (33 ft) depth of water regardless of the tide and with the high surrounding hills blocking the winds and thus keeping the water calm. Here is sited a ship graveyard for civilian but particularly naval vessels. The only difficulty is the Capelan bank, to the south of Logonna-Daoulas, where the depth is less than 5 m (16 ft) - this bank has to be passed to reach the base and thus prevents very deep-draught vessels from reaching it.

A naval station was first set up here around 1840 to house reserve fleet vessels and their crews (totalling nearly 200 sailors), and it was visited by Napoleon III and empress Eugénie during their August 1858 trip into Brittany. During the Second World War the base was used by the German occupiers such as the school ship Armorique (sabotaged in August 1944). Post-war, the ship moved from a base for reserve ships kept in readiness to disarmed naval ships left here for other purposes. Other disarmed French ships have been used as breakwaters before the château de Brest or as training ships off the naval school at Lanvéoc-Poulmic, but those at Landévennec await demolition or use for target practice in naval exercises at sea. Despite requests from Landévennec's mayor, the aircraft carrier Clemenceau was not retired to the base, with the Capelan bank apparently discouraging pilots from attempting to navigate it into the base. However, having been emptied of nearly all its occupants, in August 2006 the graveyard took on three former breakwaters which would become Brest's "port du Château" and had been moved to allow expansion work to begin. The cruiser Colbert and the Soviet-built hydrofoil ferry Kometa from the Penn-ar-Bed company (which provided summer services to Ushant) are now also based here.

== See also ==
- Communes of the Finistère department
- Landévennec Abbey
- Parc naturel régional d'Armorique
