= Le Faou =

Le Faou Ar Faou
- Commune
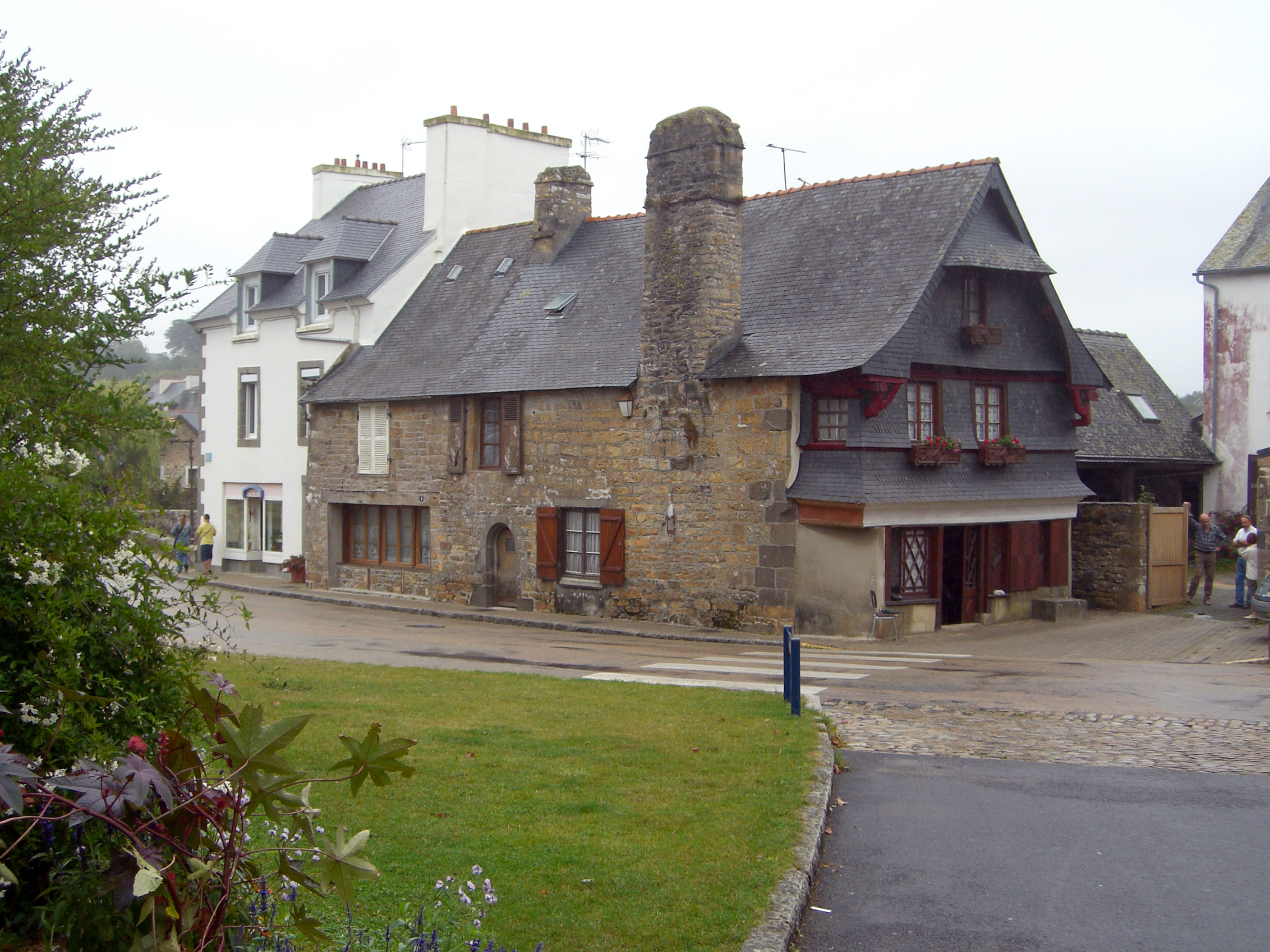
- Old house in Le Faou

- Coat of arms
- Location of Le Faou
- Location within France Location within Brittany
- Coordinates: 48°17′36″N 4°10′39″W
- Country: France
- Region: Brittany
- Department: Finistère
- Arrondissement: Châteaulin
- Canton: Pont-de-Buis-lès-Quimerch
- Intercommunality: Presqu'île de Crozon-Aulne maritime

Government
  - Mayor (2023–2026): Ludovic Lassagne
- Area^{1}: 11.85 km^{2} (4.58 sq mi)
- Highest elevation: 151 m (495 ft)
- Lowest elevation: 3 m (9.8 ft)
- Population (2023): 1,911
  - Density: 161.3/km^{2} (417.7/sq mi)
- Time zone: UTC+01:00 (CET)
  - Summer (DST): UTC+02:00 (CEST)
- INSEE/Postal code: 29053 /29590
- ^{1} French Land Register data, which excludes lakes, ponds, glaciers > 1 km^{2} (0.386 sq mi or 247 acres) and river estuaries.

Le Faou (Breton: Ar Faou) is a commune in the Finistère department of Brittany in north-western France.

== Population ==
Historical population
Year	Pop.	±% p.a.
1968	1,636	—
1975	1,510	−1.14%
1982	1,554	+0.41%
1990	1,522	−0.26%
1999	1,571	+0.35%
2007	1,708	+1.05%
2012	1,714	+0.07%
2017	1,727	+0.15%
2023	1,911	+1.70%
Source: INSEE

Inhabitants of Le Faou are called in French Faouistes.

== Events ==
The commune contains the village of Rumengol, location of a major religious Pardon on 15 August every year.

== Breton language ==
In 2008, 12% of primary-school children attended bilingual schools, where Breton language is taught alongside French.

== See also ==
- Communes of the Finistère department
- List of works of the two Folgoët ateliers
- Parc naturel régional d'Armorique
