= Aulne =

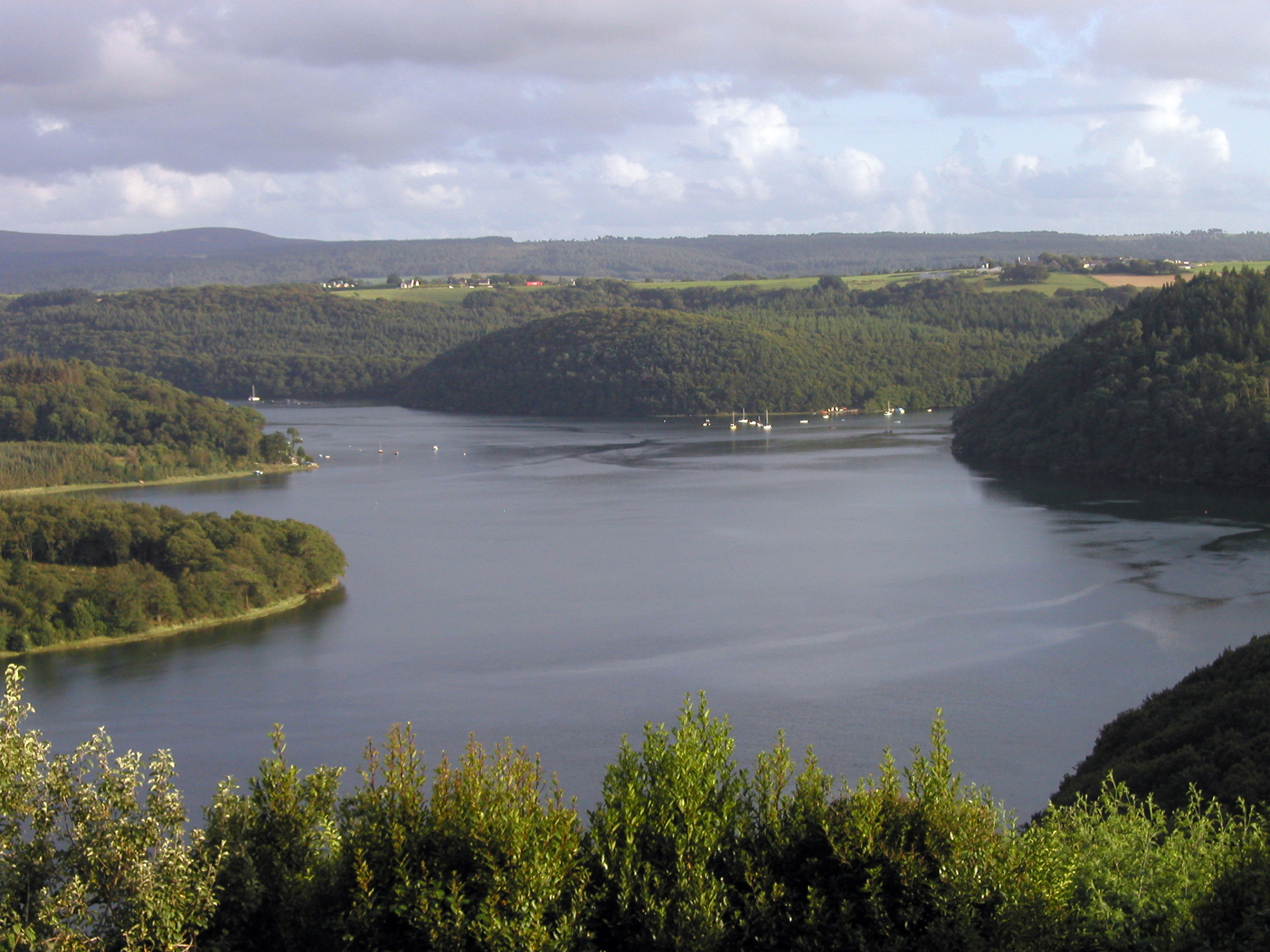

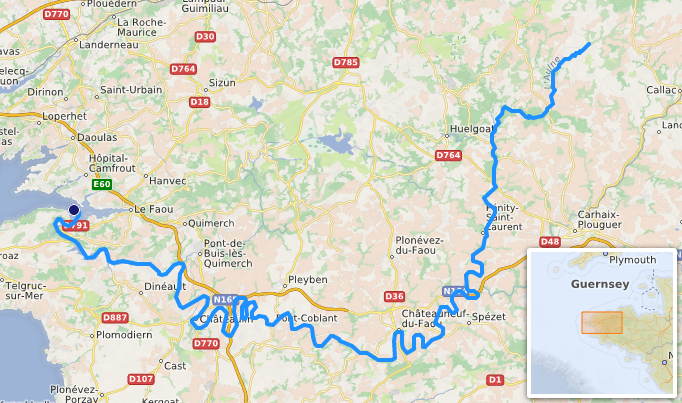
- Native name: L'Aulne (French)

Location
- Country: France

Physical characteristics
- Source
  - location: Brittany
- Mouth
  - location: Atlantic Ocean
  - coordinates: 48°18′22″N 4°20′4″W
- Length: 144 km (89 mi)

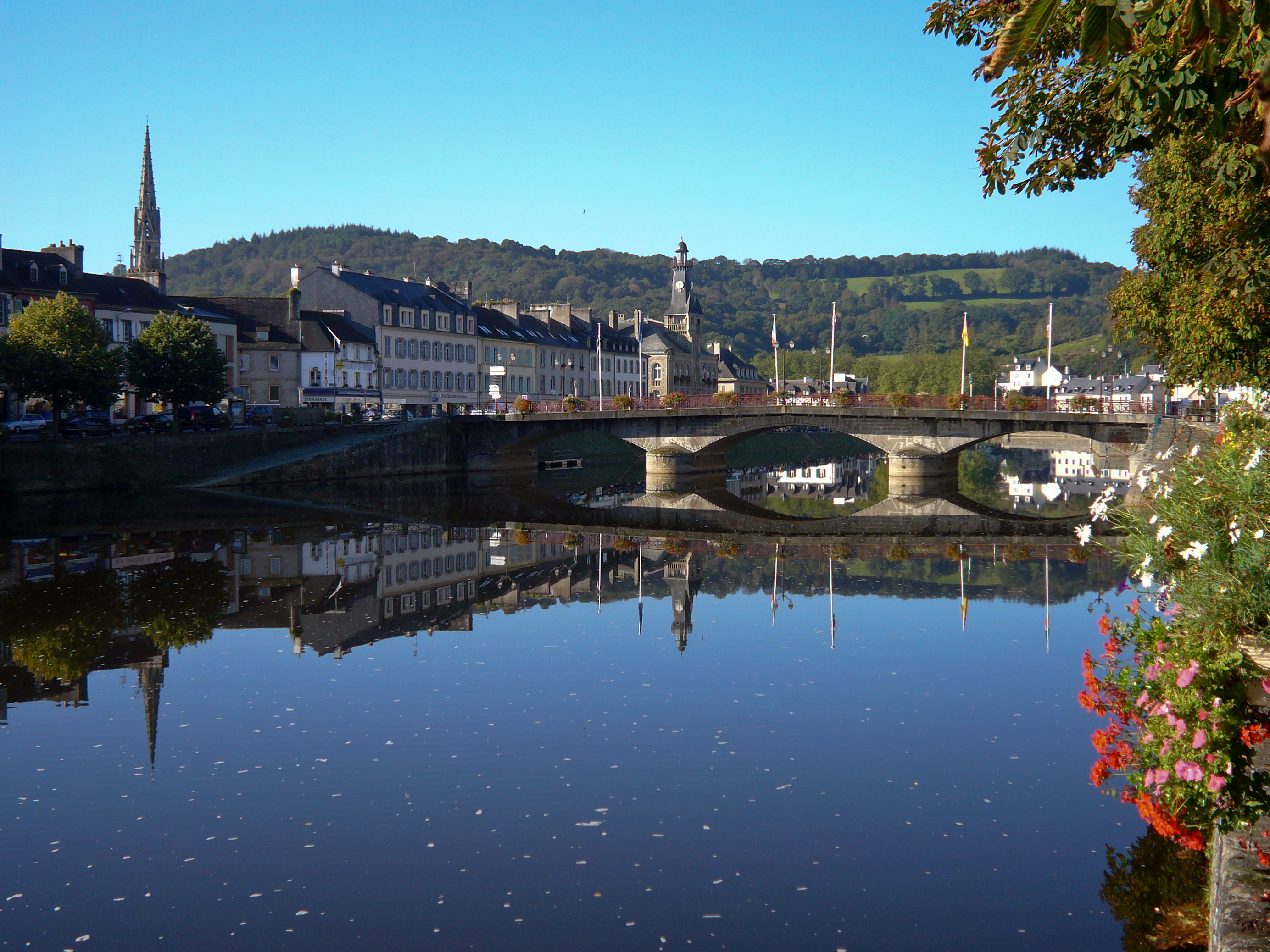
Châteaulin and Aulne

The Aulne (French pronunciation: [on]; Breton: Aon) is a 144 km (89 mi) long river of Brittany in north-western France, flowing down the hills and emptying into the roadstead of Brest, one of the many fjord-like bays just south of Brest. The river is part of the Canal de Nantes à Brest, the navigation canal that once connected the city of Nantes on the Loire with the port town of Brest on the Atlantic coast. This canal is still navigable over part of its length, but sea-going traffic is interrupted by the hydro-electric dam of Guerledan, which submerged a number of the original locks of the canal. The Aulne flows through Châteaulin.

The river was known to the Romans as the Alaunus, a name of uncertain etymology.
