= History of aesthetics =

This is a history of aesthetics.

== Ancient Greek aesthetics ==
The first important contributions to aesthetic theory are usually considered to stem from philosophers in Ancient Greece, among which the most noticeable are Plato, Aristotle and Plotinus. When interpreting writings from this time, it is worth noticing that it is debatable whether an exact equivalent to the term beauty existed in classical Greek.

Xenophon regarded the beautiful as coincident with the good, while both of these concepts are resolvable into the useful. Every beautiful object is so called because it serves some rational end: either the security or the gratification of man. Socrates rather emphasized the power of beauty to further the more necessary ends of life than the immediate gratification which a beautiful object affords to perception and contemplation. His doctrine puts forward the relativity of beauty. Plato, in contrast, recognized that beauty exists as an abstract Form. It is therefore absolute and does not necessarily stand in relation to a percipient mind.

=== Plato ===
Pertaining to Plato's views on the subject, it is hardly less difficult to gain a clear conception from the Dialogues, than it is in the case of ethical good. In some of these, various definitions of the beautiful are rejected as inadequate by the Platonic Socrates. At the same time we may conclude that Plato's mind leaned decidedly to the conception of an absolute beauty, which took its place in his scheme of ideas or self-existing forms. This true beauty is nothing discoverable as an attribute in another thing, for these are only beautiful things, not the beautiful itself. Love (Eros) produces aspiration towards this pure idea. Elsewhere the soul's intuition of the self-beautiful is said to be a reminiscence of its prenatal existence. As to the precise forms in which the idea of beauty reveals itself, Plato is not very decided. His theory of an absolute beauty does not easily adjust itself to the notion of its contributing merely a variety of sensuous pleasure, to which he appears to lean in some dialogues. He tends to identify the self-beautiful with the conceptions of the true and the good, and thus there arose the Platonic formula kalokagathia. So far as his writings embody the notion of any common element in beautiful objects, it is proportion, harmony or unity among their parts. He emphasizes unity in its simplest aspect as seen in evenness of line and purity of color. He recognizes in places the beauty of the mind, and seems to think that the highest beauty of proportion is to be found in the union of a beautiful mind with a beautiful body. He had but a poor opinion of art, regarding it as a trick of imitation (mimesis) which takes us another step further from the luminous sphere of rational intuition into the shadowy region of the semblances of sense. Accordingly, in his scheme for an ideal republic, he provided for the most inexorable censorship of poets, etc., so as to make art as far as possible an instrument of moral and political training.

An example of Plato's considerations about poetry is: "For the authors of those great poems which we admire, do not attain to excellence through the rules of any art; but they utter their beautiful melodies of verse in a state of inspiration, and, as it were, possessed by a spirit not their own."

=== Aristotle ===
Aristotle, in contrast to Plato, developed certain principles of beauty and art, most clearly so in his treatises on poetry and rhetoric. He saw the absence of all lust or desire in the pleasure it bestows as another characteristic of the beautiful. Aristotle finds (in the Metaphysics) the universal elements of beauty to be order (taxis), symmetry and definiteness or determinateness (to orismenon). In the Poetics he adds another essential, namely, a certain magnitude; the object should not be too large, while clearness of perception requires that it should not be too small.

Aristotle was passionate about goodness in men as he valued "taking [its] virtues to be central to a well-lived life." In Politics, he writes, "Again, men in general desire the good, and not merely what their fathers had." To thoroughly comprehend goodness, Aristotle also studied Beauty. As noted in the Encyclopædia Britannica (1902), moreover, Aristotle, "ignores all conceptions of an absolute Beauty, and at the same time seeks to distinguish the Beautiful from the Good." Aristotle explains that men "will be better able to achieve [their] good if [they] develop a fuller understanding of what it is to flourish." He nonetheless seeks (in the Metaphysics) to distinguish the good and the beautiful by saying that the former is always in action (`en praxei) whereas the latter may exist in motionless things as well (`en akinetois). At the same time he allowed that the good might under certain conditions be called beautiful. He further distinguished the beautiful from the fit, and in a passage of the Politics set beauty above the useful and necessary.

Aristotle's views on fine art distinctly recognized (in the Politics and elsewhere) that the aim of art is immediate pleasure, as distinct from utility, which is the end of the mechanical arts. He took a higher view of artistic imitation than Plato, holding that it implied knowledge and discovery, that its objects not only comprised particular things which happen to exist, but contemplated what is probable and what necessarily exists. In the Poetics he declares poetry to be more philosophical and serious a matter (spoudaiteron) than History. He gives us no complete classification of the fine arts, and it is doubtful how far his principles, e.g. his idea of a purification of the passions by tragedy, are to be taken as applicable to other than the poetic art.

=== Plotinus ===
Of the later Greek and Roman writers the Neo-Platonist Plotinus deserves to be mentioned. According to him, objective reason (nous) as self-moving, becomes the formative influence which reduces dead matter to form. Matter when thus formed becomes a notion (logos), and its form is beauty. Objects are ugly so far as they are unacted upon by reason, and therefore formless. The creative reason is absolute beauty, and is called the more than beautiful. There are three degrees or stages of manifested beauty: that of human reason, which is the highest; of the human soul, which is less perfect through its connexion with a material body; and of real objects, which is the lowest manifestation of all. As to the precise forms of beauty, he supposed, in opposition to Aristotle, that a single thing not divisible into parts might be beautiful through its unity and simplicity. He gives a high place to the beauty of colours in which material darkness is overpowered by light and warmth. In reference to artistic beauty he said that when the artist has notions as models for his creations, these may become more beautiful than natural objects. This is clearly a step away from Plato's doctrine towards our modern conception of artistic idealization.

== Western medieval aesthetics ==
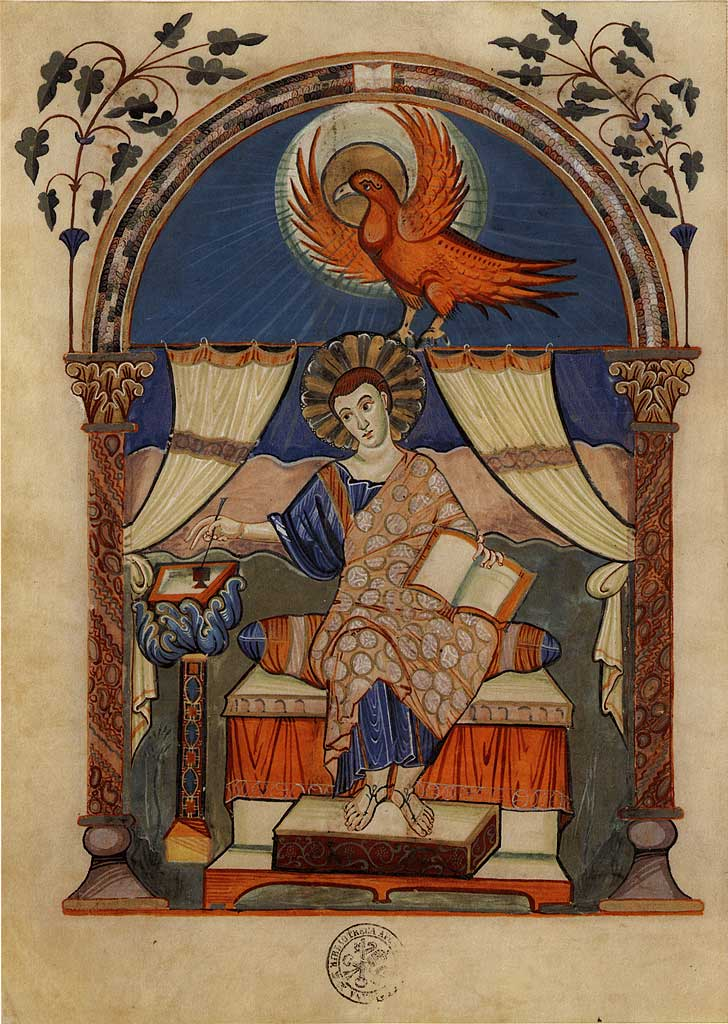
Lorsch Gospels 778–820. Charlemagne's Court School.

Surviving medieval art is primarily religious in focus and funded largely by the State, Roman Catholic or Orthodox church, powerful ecclesiastical individuals, or wealthy secular patrons. These art pieces often served a liturgical function, whether as chalices or even as church buildings themselves. Objects of fine art from this period were frequently made from rare and valuable materials, such as gold and lapis, the cost of which commonly exceeded the wages of the artist.

Medieval aesthetics in the realm of philosophy built upon Classical thought, continuing the practice of Plotinus by employing theological terminology in its explications. St. Bonaventure's "Retracing the Arts to Theology", a primary example of this method, discusses the skills of the artisan as gifts given by God for the purpose of disclosing God to mankind, which purpose is achieved through four lights: the light of skill in mechanical arts which discloses the world of artifacts; which light is guided by the light of sense perception which discloses the world of natural forms; which light, consequently, is guided by the light of philosophy which discloses the world of intellectual truth; finally, this light is guided by the light of divine wisdom which discloses the world of saving truth.

Saint Thomas Aquinas's aesthetic is probably the most famous and influential theory among medieval authors, having been the subject of much scrutiny in the wake of the neo-Scholastic revival of the late 19th and early 20th centuries and even having received the approbation of the celebrated Modernist writer, James Joyce. Thomas, like many other medievals, never gives a systematic account of beauty itself, but several scholars have conventionally arranged his thought—though not always with uniform conclusions—using relevant observations spanning the entire corpus of his work. While Aquinas's theory follows generally the model of Aristotle, he develops a singular aesthetics which incorporates elements unique to his thought. Umberto Eco's The Aesthetics of Thomas Aquinas identifies the three main characteristics of beauty in Aquinas's philosophy: integritas sive perfectio (integrity or perfection), consonantia sive debita proportio (consonance or proportion), and claritas sive splendor formae (brightness or form). While Aristotle likewise identifies the first two characteristics, St. Thomas conceives of the third as an appropriation from principles developed by neo-Platonic and Augustinian thinkers. With the shift from the Middle Ages to the [Renaissance], art likewise changed its focus, as much in its content as in its mode of expression.

== Baroque and Neoclassicism ==
=== Tesauro ===
In the seventeenth-century aesthetic concepts from classical antiquity in Western art, including proportion, harmony, unity, decorum, were challenged by new styles, such as Baroque, that adopted new styles and technique to distinguish itself from previous forms of art. The key concepts of the Baroque aesthetic, such as "conceit" (concetto), "wit" (acutezza, ingegno), and "wonder" (meraviglia), were not fully developed in literary theory until the publication of Emanuele Tesauro's Il Cannocchiale aristotelico (The Aristotelian Telescope) in 1654. This seminal treatise - inspired by Giambattista Marino's epic Adone and the work of the Spanish Jesuit philosopher Baltasar Gracián - developed a theory of metaphor as a universal language of images and as a supreme intellectual act, at once an artifice and an epistemologically privileged mode of access to truth.

=== Bellori ===
In 1664, Giovanni Pietro Bellori, Roman art theorist and close friend of Poussin, gave a lecture at the Roman Accademia di San Luca entitled "L'idea del pittore, dello scultore e dell'architetto". The Idea was published in 1672 as the preface to Bellori's Le vite de' pittori, scultori et architetti moderni. Since then it has acquired almost canonical status as one of the earliest declarations of the principles of Classicism.

For Bellori, under the influence of the Neoplatonic aesthetic of Plotinus, the 'highest and eternal intellect' had fashioned the supreme archetypes of multifarious nature, the 'Ideas', out of his own being, as the 'perfection of natural beauty', and the artists of antiquity had looked beyond nature to the superior 'Idea' itself.

Bellori was hugely influential in the development of the concept of 'ideal beauty'. According to Erwin Panofsky, Bellori is the predecessor of Winckelmann as an art theorist. Winckelmann's theory of the "ideally beautiful" as he expounds it in Geschichte der Kunst des Altertums, thoroughly agrees with the content of Bellori's Idea (to which Winckelmann also owes his acquaintance with the letters of Raphael and Guido Reni). Winckelmann himself frankly recognizes this indebtedness. In the essay "A Parallel of Poetry and Painting," which prefaces his translation of Du Fresnoy Latin poem De arte graphica, Dryden includes a lengthy excerpt from Bellori's Idea. It is through Bellori's formulation, that the notion of ideal beauty was introduced in France, Germany and England, in art criticism generally, and survived throughout the 19th century.

== Age of Enlightenment ==
=== Addison ===
Joseph Addison's "Essays on the Imagination" contributed to the Spectator, though they belong to popular literature, contain the germ of scientific analysis in the statement that the pleasures of imagination (which arise originally from sight) fall into two classes — (1) primary pleasures, which entirely proceed from objects before our eyes; and (2) secondary pleasures, flowing from the ideas of visible objects. The latter are greatly extended by the addition of the proper enjoyment of resemblance, which is at the basis of all mimicry and wit. Addison recognizes, too, to some extent, the influence of association upon our aesthetic preferences.

=== Shaftesbury ===
Shaftesbury is the first of the intuitional writers on beauty. In his Characteristicks the beautiful and the good are combined in one ideal conception, much as with Plato. Matter in itself is ugly. The order of the world, wherein all beauty really resides, is a spiritual principle, all motion and life being the product of spirit. The principle of beauty is perceived not with the outer sense, but with an internal or moral sense which apprehends the good as well. This perception yields the only true delight, namely, spiritual enjoyment.

=== Hutcheson ===
Francis Hutcheson, in his System of Moral Philosophy, though he adopts many of Shaftesbury's ideas, distinctly disclaims any independent self-existing beauty in objects. "All beauty", he says, "is relative to the sense of some mind perceiving it." One cause of beauty is to be found not in a simple sensation such as colour or tone, but in a certain order among the parts, or "uniformity amidst variety". The faculty by which this principle is discerned is an internal sense which is defined as "a passive power of receiving ideas of beauty from all objects in which there is uniformity in variety". This inner sense resembles the external senses in the immediateness of the pleasure which its activity brings, and further in the necessity of its impressions: a beautiful thing being always, whether we will or no, beautiful. He distinguishes two kinds of beauty, absolute or original, and relative or comparative. The latter is discerned in an object which is regarded as an imitation or semblance of another. He distinctly states that "an exact imitation may still be beautiful though the original were entirely devoid of it." He seeks to prove the universality of this sense of beauty, by showing that all men, in proportion to the enlargement of their intellectual capacity, are more delighted with uniformity than the opposite.

=== Alexander Gottlieb Baumgarten ===
Perhaps the first German philosopher who developed an independent aesthetic theory was Baumgarten. In his best-known work Aesthetica, he complemented the Leibniz-Wolffian theory of knowledge by adding to the clear scientific or "logical" knowledge of the understanding the knowledge of the senses, to which he gave the name "aesthetic". It is for this reason that Baumgarten is said to have "coined" the term aesthetics. Beauty to him corresponds to perfect sense-knowledge. Baumgarten reduces taste to an intellectual act and ignores the element of feeling. To him, nature is the highest embodiment of beauty, and thus art must seek its supreme function in the strictest possible imitation of nature.

=== Burke ===
Burke's speculations, in his Inquiry into the Origin of our Ideas of the Sublime and Beautiful, illustrate the tendency of English writers to treat the problem as a psychological one and to introduce physiological considerations. He finds the elements of beauty to be:-- (1) smallness; (2) smoothness; (3) gradual variation of direction in gentle curves; (4) delicacy, or the appearance of fragility; (5) brightness, purity and softness of colour. The sublime is rather crudely resolved into astonishment, which he thinks always retains an element of terror. Thus "infinity has a tendency to fill the mind with a delightful horror." Burke seeks what he calls "efficient causes" for these aesthetic impressions in certain affections of the nerves of sight analogous to those of other senses, namely, the soothing effect of a relaxation of the nerve fibres. The arbitrariness and narrowness of this theory cannot well escape the reader's attention.

=== Kant ===
Immanuel Kant's theory of aesthetic judgments remains a highly debated aesthetic theory until today. Kant uses the term "aesthetics" ("Ästhetik") to refer to any sensual experience. The work most crucial to aesthetics as a strand of philosophy is the first half of his Critique of the Power of Judgment, the Critique of the Aesthetic Power of Judgment. It is subdivided in two main parts - the Analytic of the Beautiful and the Analytic of the Sublime, but also deals with the experience of fine art.

For Kant, beauty does not reside inside an object, but is defined as the pleasure that stems from the ″free play″ of imagination and understanding inspired by the object — which as a result we will call beautiful. Such pleasure is more than mere agreeableness, since it must be disinterested and free — that is to say independent from the object's ability to serve as a means to an end. Even though the feeling of beauty is subjective, Kant goes beyond the notion of ″beauty is in the eye of the beholder″: If something is beautiful to me, I also think that it should be so for everybody else, even though I cannot prove beauty to anyone. Kant also insists that the aesthetic judgment is always, an "individual" i.e. a singular one, of the form "This object (e.g. rose) is beautiful." He denies that we can reach a valid universal aesthetic judgment of the form "All objects possessing such and such qualities are beautiful." (A judgment of this form would be logical, not aesthetic.) Nature, in Kant's aesthetics, is the primary example for beauty, ranking as a source of aesthetic pleasure above art, which he only considers in the last parts of the third Critique of the Aesthetic Judgment. It is in these last paragraphs where he connects to his earlier works when he argues that the highest significance of beauty is to symbolize moral good; going in this regard even further than Ruskin.

== German writers ==
=== Schelling ===
Friedrich Wilhelm Joseph Schelling is the first thinker to attempt a Philosophy of Art. He develops this as the third part of his system of transcendental idealism following theoretic and practical philosophy. (See also Schelling's Werke, Bd. v., and J. Watson, Schelling's Transcendental Idealism, ch. vii., Chicago, 1882.) According to Schelling a new philosophical significance is given to art by the doctrine that the identity of subject and object — which is half disguised in ordinary perception and volition — is only clearly seen in artistic perception. The perfect perception of its real self by intelligence in the work of art is accompanied by a feeling of infinite satisfaction. Art in thus effecting a revelation of the absolute seems to attain a dignity not merely above that of nature but above that of philosophy itself. Schelling throws but little light on the concrete forms of beauty. His classification of the arts, based on his antithesis of object and subject, is a curiosity in intricate arrangement. He applies his conception in a suggestive way to classical tragedy.

=== Hegel ===
In Georg Wilhelm Friedrich Hegel's system of philosophy art is viewed as the first stage of the absolute spirit. (See also Werke, Bd. x., and Bosanquet's Introduction to Hegel's Philosophy of Fine Art.). In this stage the absolute is immediately present to sense-perception, an idea which shows the writer's complete rupture with Kant's doctrine of the "subjectivity" of beauty. The beautiful is defined as the ideal showing itself to sense or through a sensuous medium. It is said to have its life in show or semblance (Schein) and so differs from the true, which is not really sensuous, but the universal idea contained in sense for thought. The form of the beautiful is unity of the manifold. The notion (Begriff) gives necessity in mutual dependence of parts (unity), while the reality demands the semblance (Schein) of liberty in the parts. He discusses very fully the beauty of nature as immediate unity of notion and reality, and lays great emphasis on the beauty of organic life. But it is in art that, like Schelling, Hegel finds the highest revelation of the beautiful. Art makes up for the deficiencies of natural beauty by bringing the idea into clearer light, by showing the external world in its life and spiritual animation. The several species of art in the ancient and modern worlds depend on the various combinations of matter and form. He classifies the individual arts according to this same principle of the relative supremacy of form and matter, the lowest being architecture, the highest, poetry.

=== Dialectic of the Hegelians ===
Curious developments of the Hegelian conception are to be found in the dialectical treatment of beauty in its relation to the ugly, the sublime, etc., by Hegel's disciples, e.g. C. H. Weisse and J. K. F. Rosenkranz. The most important product of the Hegelian School is the elaborate system of aesthetics published by F. T. Vischer (Esthetik, 3 Theile, 1846–1834). It illustrates the difficulties of the Hegelian thought and terminology; yet in dealing with art it is full of knowledge and highly suggestive.

=== Schopenhauer ===
The aesthetic problem is also treated by two other philosophers whose thought set out from certain tendencies in Kant's system, namely Schopenhauer and Herbart. Schopenhauer (see also The World as Will and Idea, translated by R. B. Haldane, esp. vol. i. pp. 219–346), abandoning also Kant's doctrine of the subjectivity of beauty, found in aesthetic contemplation the perfect emancipation of intellect from will. In this contemplation the mind is filled with pure intellectual forms, the "Platonic Ideas" as he calls them, which are objectifications of the will at a certain grade of completeness of representation. He exalts the state of artistic contemplation as the one in which, as pure intellect set free from will, the misery of existence is surmounted and something of blissful ecstasy attained. He holds that all things are in some degree beautiful, ugliness being viewed as merely imperfect manifestation or objectification of will. In this way the beauty of nature, somewhat slighted by Schelling and Hegel, is rehabilitated.

=== Herbart ===
J. F. Herbart struck out another way of escaping from Kant's idea of a purely subjective beauty (Kerbach's edition of Werke, Bd. ii. pp. 339 et seq.; Bd. iv. pp. 105 et seq., and Bd. ix. pp. 92 et seq..). He did, indeed, adopt Kant's view of the aesthetic Judgment as singular ("individual"); though he secures a certain degree of logical universality for it by emphasizing the point that the predicate (beauty) is permanently true of the same aesthetic object. At the same time, by referring the beauty of concrete objects to certain aesthetic relations, he virtually accepted the possibility of universal aesthetic judgments (compare above). Since he thus reduces beauty to abstract relations he is known as a formalist, and the founder of the formalistic school in aesthetics. He sets out with the idea that only relations please — in the Kantian sense of producing pleasure devoid of desire; and his aim is to determine the "aesthetic elementary relations", or the simplest relations which produce this pleasure. These include those of will, so that, as he admits, ethical judgments are in a manner brought under an aesthetic form. His typical example of aesthetic relations of objects of sense-perception is that of harmony between tones. The science of thorough-bass has, he thinks, done for music what should be done also for other departments of aesthetic experience. This doctrine of elementary relations is brought into connexion with the author's psychological doctrine of presentations with their tendencies to mutual inhibition and to fusion, and of the varying feeling-tones to which these processes give rise. This mode of treating the problem of beauty and aesthetic perception has been greatly developed and worked up into a complete system of aesthetics by one of Herbart's disciples, Robert Zimmermann (Asthetik, 1838).

=== Lessing ===
Gotthold Ephraim Lessing, in his Laocoon and elsewhere, sought to deduce the special function of an art from a consideration of the means at its disposal. He took pains to define the boundaries of poetry and upon the ends and appliances of art. Among these his distinction between arts which employ the coexistent in space and those which employ the successive (as poetry and music) is of lasting value. In his dramatic criticisms he similarly endeavoured to develop clear general principles on such points as poetic truth, improving upon Aristotle, on whose teaching he mainly relied.

=== Goethe and Schiller ===
Johann Wolfgang von Goethe wrote several tracts on aesthetic topics, as well as many aphorisms. He attempted to mediate between the claims of ideal beauty, as taught by J. J. Winckelmann, and the aims of dualization. Schiller discusses, in a number of disconnected essays and letters some of the main questions in the philosophy of art. He looks at art from the side of culture and the forces of human nature, and finds in an aesthetically cultivated soul the reconciliation of the sensual and rational. His letters on aesthetic education (Uber die asthetische Erziehung des Menschen, trans. by J. Weiss, Boston, 1845) are valuable, bringing out among other points the connexion between aesthetic activity and the universal impulse to play (Spieltrieb). Schiller's thoughts on aesthetic subjects are pervaded with the spirit of Kant's philosophy.

=== Jean Paul Richter ===
Another example of this kind of reflective discussion of art by literary men is afforded us in the Vorschule der Asthetik of Jean Paul Richter. This is a rather ambitious discussion of the sublime and ludicrous, which, however, contains much valuable matter on the nature of humour in romantic poetry. Among other writers who reflect more or less philosophically on the problems to which modern poetry gives rise are Wilhelm von Humboldt, the two Schlegels (August and Friedrich) and Gervinus.

=== Contributions by German savants ===
A word may be said in conclusion on the attempts of German savants to apply a knowledge of physiological conditions to the investigation of the sensuous elements of aesthetic effect, as well as to introduce into the study of the simpler aesthetic forms the methods of natural science. The classic work of Helmholtz on "Sensations of Tone" is a highly musical composition on physics and physiology. The endeavour to determine with a like degree of precision the physiological conditions of the pleasurable effects of colours and their combinations by E. W. Brucke, Ewald Hering and more recent investigators, has so far failed to realize the desideratum laid down by Herbart, that there should be a theory of colour-relations equal in completeness and exactness to that of tone-relations. The experimental inquiry into simple aesthetically pleasing forms was begun by G. T. Fechner in seeking to test the soundness of Adolf Zeising's hypothesis that the most pleasing proportion in dividing a line, say the vertical part of a cross, is the "golden section", where the smaller division is to the larger as the latter to the sum. He describes in his work on "Experimental Aesthetics" (Auf experimentalen Asthetik) a series of experiments carried out on a large number of persons, bearing on this point, the results of which he considers to be in favour of Zeising's hypothesis.

== French writers ==
In France aesthetic speculation grew out of the discussion by poets and critics on the relation of modern art; and Boileau in the 17th century, the development of the dispute between the "ancients" and the "moderns" at the end of the 17th century by B. le Bouvier de Fontenelle and Charles Perrault, and the continuation of the discussion as to the aims of poetry and of art generally in the 18th century by Voltaire, Bayle, Diderot and others, not only offer to the modern theorists valuable material in the shape of a record by experts of their aesthetic experience, but disclose glimpses of important aesthetic principles. Yves Marie André's Essay on Beauty was an exploration of visual, musical, moral, and intellectual beauty. A more systematic examination of the several arts (corresponding to that of Lessing) is to be found in the Cours de belles lettres of Charles Batteux (1765), in which the meaning and value of the imitation of nature by art are further elucidated, and the arts are classified (as by Lessing) according as they employ the forms of space or those of time.

=== Theories of organic beauty: Buffier ===
The beginning of a more scientific investigation of beauty in general is connected with the name of Pere Buffier (see First Truths), form, and illustrates his theory by the human face. A beautiful face is at once the most common and most rare among members of the species. This seems to be a clumsy way of saying that it is a clear expression of the typical form of the species.

=== Hippolyte Taine ===
This idea of typical beauty (which was adopted by Reynolds) has been worked out more recently by Hippolyte Taine. In his work, The Ideal in Art (trans. by I. Durand), he proceeds in the manner of a botanist to determine a scale of characters in the physical and moral man. The degree of the universality or importance of a character, and of its beneficence or adaptation to the ends of life, determine the measure of its aesthetic value, and render the work of art, which seeks to represent it in its purity, an ideal work.

=== French systems of aesthetics: The spiritualistes ===
The only elaborated systems of aesthetics in French literature are those constructed by the spiritualistes, the philosophic writers who under the influence of German thinkers effected a reaction against the crude sensationalism of the 18th century. They aim at elucidating the higher and spiritual element in aesthetic impressions, appearing to ignore any capability in the sensuous material of affording a true aesthetic delight. Victor Cousin and Jean Charles Leveque are the principal writers of this school. The latter developed an elaborate system of the subject (La Science du beau). All beauty is regarded as spiritual in its nature. The several beautiful characters of an organic body — of which the principal are magnitude, unity and variety of parts, intensity of colour, grace or flexibility, and correspondence to environment — may be brought under the conception of the ideal grandeur and order of the species. These are perceived by reason to be the manifestations of an invisible vital force. Similarly the beauties of inorganic nature are to be viewed as the grand and orderly displays of an immaterial physical force. Thus all beauty is in its objective essence either spirit or unconscious force acting with fulness and in order.

== British writers ==
There is nothing answering to the German conception of a system of aesthetics in English literature. The inquiries of English thinkers have been directed for the most part to such modest problems as the psychological process by which we perceive the beautiful — discussions which are apt to be regarded by German historians as devoid of real philosophical value. The writers may be conveniently arranged in two divisions, answering to the two opposed directions of English thought: (1) the Intuitionalists, those who recognize the existence of an objective beauty which is a simple unanalysable attribute or principle of things; and (2) the Analytical theorists, those who follow the analytical and psychological method, concerning themselves with the sentiment of beauty as a complex growth out of simpler elements.

=== The Intuitionists ===
==== Reid ====
In his Essays on the Intellectual Powers (viii. "Of Taste") Thomas Reid applies his principle of common sense to the problem of beauty saying that objects of beauty agree not only in producing a certain agreeable emotion, but in the excitation along with this emotion of a belief that they possess some perfection or excellence, that beauty exists in the objects independently of our minds His theory of beauty is severely spiritual. All beauty resides primarily in the faculties of the mind, intellectual and moral. The beauty which is spread over the face of visible nature is an emanation from this spiritual beauty, and is beauty because it symbolizes and expresses the latter. Thus the beauty of a plant resides in its perfect adaptation to its end, a perfection which is an expression of the wisdom of its Creator.

==== Hamilton ====
In his Lectures on Metaphysics, Sir W. Hamilton gives a short account of the sentiments of taste, which (with a superficial resemblance to Kant) he regards as subserving both the subsidiary and the elaborative faculties in cognition, that is, the imagination and the understanding. The activity of the former corresponds to the element of variety in a beautiful object, that of the latter with its unity. He explicitly excludes all other kinds of pleasure, such as the sensuous, from the proper gratification of beauty. He denies that the attribute of beauty belongs to fitness.

==== Ruskin ====
John Ruskin's well-known speculations on the nature of beauty in Modern Painters ("Of ideas of beauty"), though sadly wanting in scientific precision, have a certain value in the history of divine attributes. Its true nature is appreciated by the theoretic faculty which is concerned in the moral conception and appreciation of ideas of beauty, and must be distinguished from the imaginative or artistic faculty, which is employed in regarding in a certain way and combining the ideas received from external nature. He distinguishes between typical and vital beauty. The former is the external quality of bodies which typifies some divine attribute. The latter consists in "the appearance of felicitous fulfilment of function in living things". The forms of typical beauty are:-- (1) infinity, the type of the divine incomprehensibility; (2) unity, the type of the divine comprehensiveness; (3) repose, the type of the divine permanence; (4) symmetry, the type of the divine justice; (5) purity, the type of the divine energy; and (6) moderation, the type of government by law. Vital beauty, again, is regarded as relative when the degree of exaltation of the function is estimated, or generic if only the degree of conformity of an individual to the appointed functions of the species is taken into account. Ruskin's writings illustrate the extreme tendency to identify aesthetic with moral perception.

=== The analytical theorists ===
==== Home ====
In the Elements of Criticism of Henry Home (Lord Kames) another attempt is made to resolve the pleasure of beauty into its elements. Beauty and ugliness are simply the pleasant and he appears to admit no general characteristic of beautiful objects beyond this power of yielding pleasure. Like Hutcheson, he divides beauty into intrinsic and relative, but understands by the latter the appearance of fitness and utility, which is excluded from the beautiful by Hutcheson.

==== Hogarth ====
Passing by the name of Sir Joshua Reynolds, whose theory of beauty closely resembles that of Pere Buffier, we come to the articulations of another artist and painter, William Hogarth. He discusses, in his Analysis of Beauty, all the elements of visual beauty. He finds in this the following elements:-- (1) fitness of the parts to some design; (2) variety in as many ways as possible; (3) uniformity, regularity or symmetry, which is only beautiful when it helps to preserve the character of fitness; (4) simplicity or distinctness, which gives pleasure not in itself, but through its enabling the eye to enjoy variety with ease; (5) intricacy, which provides employment for our active energies, leading the eye "a wanton kind of chase"; (6) quantity or magnitude, which draws our attention and produces admiration and awe. The beauty of proportion he resolves into the needs of fitness. Hogarth applies these principles to the determination of the degrees of beauty in lines, figures and groups of forms. Among lines he singles out for special honour the serpentine (formed by drawing a line once round from the base to the apex of a long slender cone).

==== Alison ====
Alison, in his well-known Essays on the Nature and Principles of Taste, proceeds by a method exactly the opposite to that of Hogarth and Burke. He seeks to analyse the mental process then finds that this consists in a peculiar operation of the imagination, namely, the flow of a train of ideas through the mind, which ideas always correspond to some simple affection or emotion (e.g. cheerfulness, sadness, awe) awakened by the object. He thus makes association the sole source of aesthetic delight, and denies the existence of a primary source in sensations themselves. He illustrates the working of the principle of association at great length, and with much skill; yet his attempt to make it the unique source of aesthetic pleasure fails completely. Francis Jeffrey's Essays on Beauty (in the Edinburgh Review, and Encyclopædia Britannica, 8th edition) are little more than a modification of Alison's theory. Philosophical Essays consists in pointing out the unwarranted assumption lurking in the doctrine of a single quality running through all varieties of beautiful object. He seeks to show how the successive changes in the meaning of the term "beautiful" have arisen. He suggests that it originally connoted the pleasure of colour. The value of his discussion resides more in the criticism of his predecessors than in the contribution of new ideas. His conception of the sublime, suggested by the etymology of the word, emphasizes the element of height in objects.

Of the association psychologists James Mill did little more towards the analysis of the sentiments of beauty than re-state Alison's doctrine. Alexander Bain, in his treatise, The Emotions and the Will ("Aesthetic Emotions"), carries this examination considerably further. He seeks to differentiate aesthetic from other varieties of pleasurable emotion by three characteristics:-- (1) their freedom from life-serving uses, being gratifications sought for their own sakes; (2) their purity from all disagreeable concomitants; (3) their eminently sympathetic or shareable nature. He takes a comprehensive view of the constituents of aesthetic enjoyment, including the pleasures of sensation and of its revived or its "ideal" form; of revived emotional states; and lastly the satisfaction of those wide-ranging susceptibilities which we call the love of novelty, of contrast and of harmony. The effect of sublimity is connected with the manifestation of superior power in its highest degrees, which manifestation excites a sympathetic elation in the beholder. The ludicrous, again, is defined by Bain, improving on Aristotle and Hobbes, as the degradation of something possessing dignity in circumstances that excite no other strong emotion.

==== Spencer ====
Herbert Spencer, in his First Principles, Principles of Psychology and Essays, has given an interesting turn to the psychology of aesthetics by the application of his doctrine of evolution. Adopting Schiller's idea of a connexion between aesthetic activity and play, he seeks to make it the starting-point in tracing the evolution of aesthetic activity. Play is defined as the outcome of the superfluous energies of the organism: as the activity of organs and faculties which, owing to a prolonged period of inactivity, have become specially ready to discharge their function, and as a consequence vent themselves in simulated actions. Aesthetic activities supply a similar mode of self-relieving discharge to the higher organs of perception and emotion; and they further agree with play in not directly subserving any processes conducive to life; in being gratifications sought for their own sake only. Spencer seeks to construct a hierarchy of aesthetic pleasures according to the degree of complexity of the faculty exercised: from those of sensation up to the revived emotional experiences which constitute the aesthetic sentiment proper. Among the more vaguely revived emotions Spencer includes more permanent feelings of the race transmitted by heredity; as when he refers the deep and indefinable emotion excited by music to associations with vocal tones expressive of feeling built up during the history of our species. This biological treatment of aesthetic activity has had a wide influence, some e.g. Grant Allen being content to develop his evolutional method. Yet, as suggested above, his theory is now recognized as taking us only a little way towards an adequate understanding of our aesthetic experience.

== Cultural history before the 20th century ==
Any aesthetic doctrines that guided the production and interpretation of prehistoric art are mostly unknown. An indirect concern with aesthetics can be inferred from ancient art in many early civilizations, including Egypt, Mesopotamia, Persia, Greece, China, the Etruscans, Rome, India, the Celtic peoples, and the Maya, as each of them developed a unique and characteristic style in its art.

=== Africa ===
African art is the cultural expression of a vast and rich continent. It is the product of millennia of changes, migrations, international and intercontinental trade, diplomacy and cultural norms. Within the scholarship surrounding African art, there is some question in using the word "art" to describe it. Malidoma and Sonbofu Somé, cultural emissaries of the Dagara of Burkina Faso hold that within their culture the closest word for art is simply the word "sacred". Kongo nkisi power objects illustrate this point. They are objects traded on the contemporary art market on aesthetic value, however their purpose was to serve in rituals of personal and community healing. Consideration is due, when viewing African cultural product, in understanding the primary function of these objects held within the cultures themselves.

There is an interplay between practicality and aesthetic in African material culture. Consider the Akan stool, Yoruba adire cloth and combs, or Gio spoons. There are examples of enlivening the most mundane object into an aesthetic presence. Sculpture and performance art are prominent, and abstract and partially abstracted forms are valued, and were valued long before influence from the Western tradition began in earnest. The Nok culture is testimony to this. The mosque of Timbuktu shows that specific areas of Africa developed unique aesthetics.

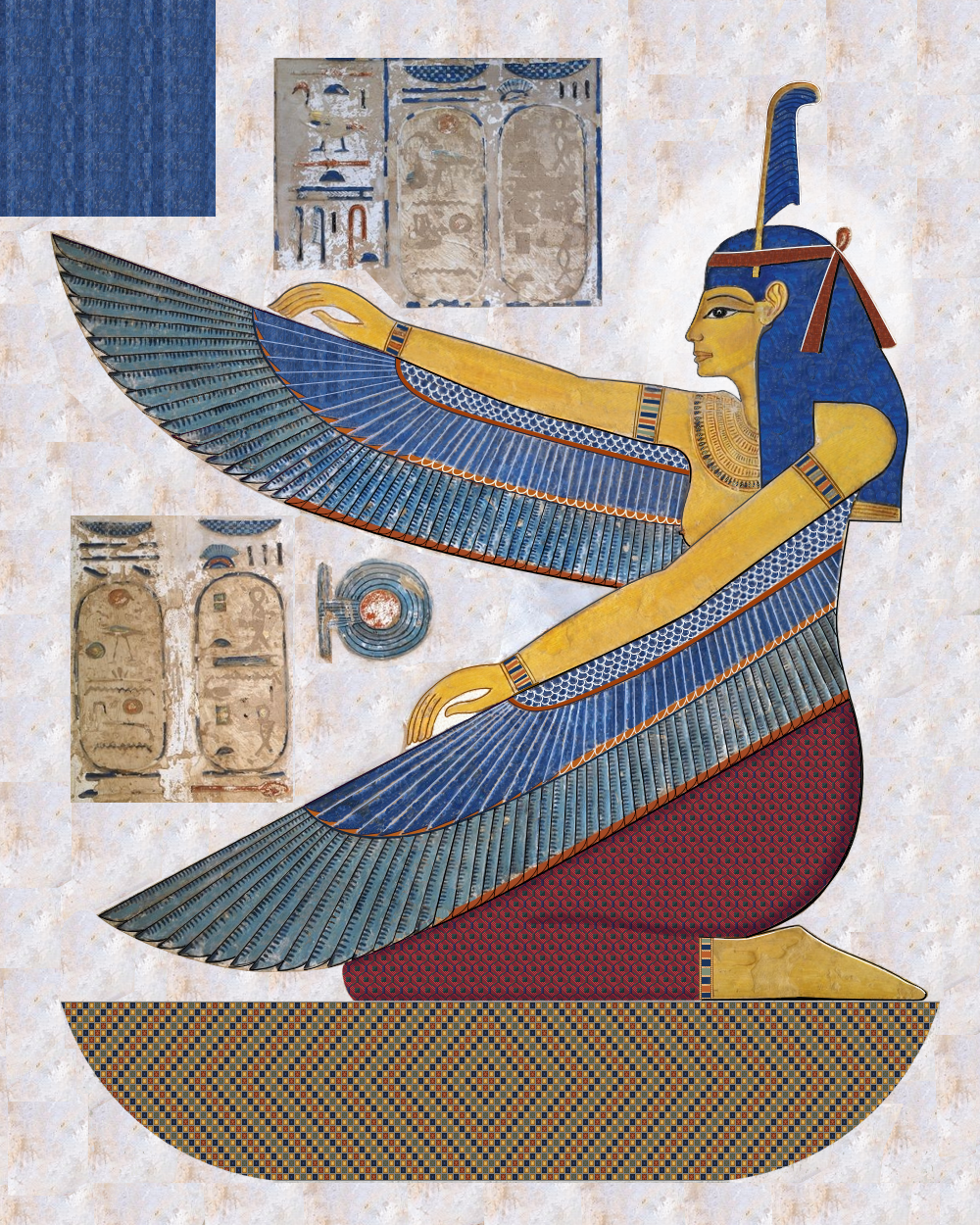
Ancient painting depicting the egyptian goddess Ma'at.

==== Egyptian aesthetics ====
The term ma'at was central in ancient Egypt and had a strong connection to aesthetics and art. Ma'at was a concept representing order, balance, justice, and truth in the universe and human life. Ma'at was also a divine figure personifying these ideals. The term ma'at had a crucial significance in Egyptian culture, including their art and architecture. Artists aimed to create harmonious and balanced compositions and used colors and proportions that were in accordance with ma'at. Artworks and architecture in ancient Egypt sought to reflect this order and balance in their proportions, patterns, and compositions. For example, in Egyptian art, such as frescoes and reliefs, humans were often depicted with clear proportions and arranged positions symbolizing harmony and beauty. Art and architecture played a vital role in preserving ma'at by conveying cosmological ideas, spiritual messages, and moral values to people. By creating aesthetically satisfying and meaningful artworks, the Egyptians helped maintain harmony and justice in society and the universe.

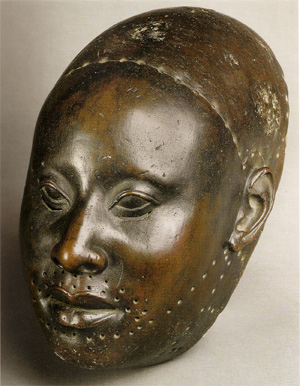
Yoruba mask for King Obalufon II.

==== Yoruba aesthetics ====
The word ẹwà is highly central within the Yoruba culture's aesthetic framework. This word is used to describe beauty and aesthetic quality within Yoruba art and culture at large. Ẹwà is not solely a description of visual beauty; it also encompasses an emotional and spiritual dimension. In Yoruba culture, beauty is not merely superficial but is also connected to deeper values and meanings. Being ẹwà also includes being true to one's own nature and soul. It is about living in harmony with oneself, one's values, and one's spiritual beliefs. Being ẹwà means being in harmony with one's innermost essence and being true to oneself.

Beauty in Yoruba culture is often associated with harmony, balance, and proportion. Artistic works considered ẹwà are those that are well-balanced, have emotional resonance, and are in harmony with Yoruba art's aesthetic traditions. This can apply to everything from sculptures and masks to textiles and architecture.

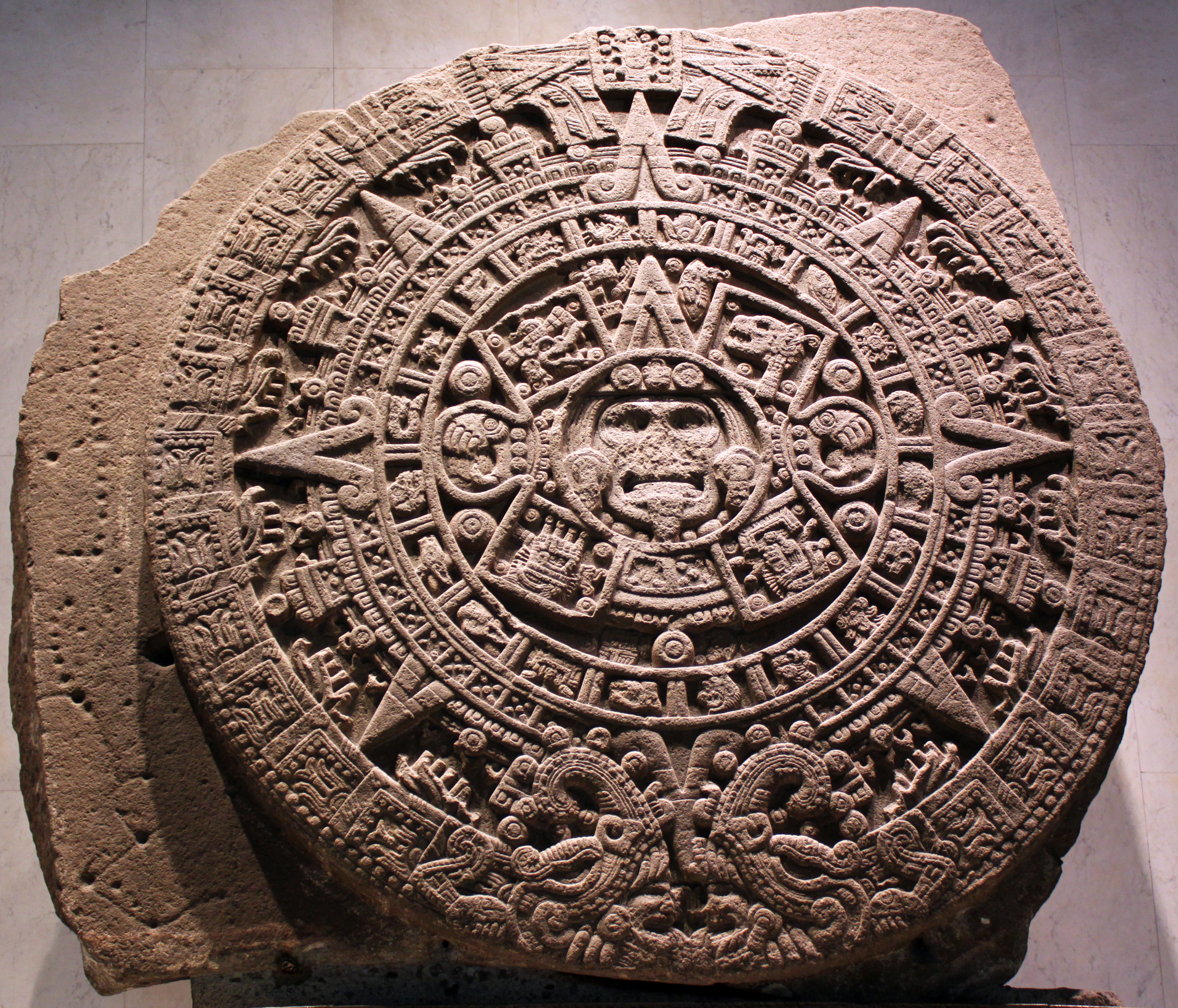
Aztec sun stone.

=== Americas ===
==== Aztec aesthetics ====
Teōtl is the Aztecs' term for the supreme divine force or deity that underlies the entire world and universe. It is an all-encompassing and transcendental force present in everything and overseeing the cosmos. Teōtl is both the creative force that created the world and the force that maintains balance and order in the cosmos. In Aztec aesthetics, artistic creations were considered aesthetically valuable if they genuinely and truthfully revealed teōtl. This meant that works of art and beauty in Aztec culture were considered true when they authentically represented the divine force and its balance and purity. Teōtl was thus the very foundation of aesthetic values and judgments in Aztec art.

Teōtl was not just an aesthetic force but also a moral and epistemological one. In Aztec philosophy, what was aesthetically valuable was also morally and epistemologically valuable, and vice versa. Creative activities and their products were considered morally and epistemologically qualified if they had a deep connection to teōtl. Teōtl also represented balance and purity, which were central aesthetic ideals in Aztec art. Aesthetically valuable creations were those that authentically and genuinely revealed balance and purity, contributing positively to the maintenance of balance and order in the cosmos.

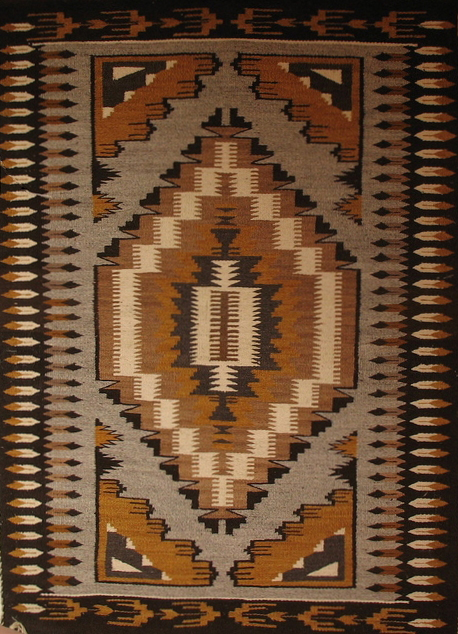
The Navajo-people are known for their textile art.

==== Navajo aesthetics ====
The concept of hózhǫ́ǫ́g (sometimes spelled "hozho") is of central importance in Navajo culture and has a deep connection to aesthetics, but it also encompasses many other aspects of Navajo people's lives and values. Hózhǫ́ǫ́g cannot be easily translated into a single word, but it can be understood as an overarching philosophy and ideal. Hózhǫ́ǫ́g is a life philosophy that strives to understand and practice beauty and balance in all aspects of life, not just in art. It is a guide for living in harmony with oneself, other people, and the world around. Hózhǫ́ǫ́g is also connected to Navajo people's cultural identity and their ability to preserve their culture and traditions. By creating art that aligns with hózhǫ́ǫ́g, they preserve their cultural heritage and pass on their values to future generations.

Hózhǫ́ǫ́g emphasizes a deep connection with nature. The Navajo people see nature as a source of beauty and inspiration. Many patterns and symbols in Navajo art are drawn from the forms and patterns found in nature, including stars, feathers, and plants. Hózhǫ́ǫ́g is also closely linked to Navajo people's spiritual beliefs. It involves being in harmony with the spiritual forces and the world around them. Artworks are sometimes used as a way to communicate with the supernatural and to honor gods and spirits.

=== Asia ===
==== Arab aesthetics ====
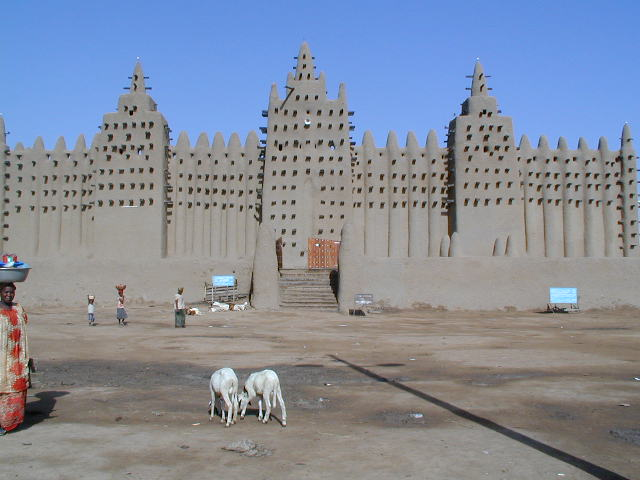
The Great Mosque's signature trio of minarets overlooks the central market of Djenné. Unique Malian aesthetic

Arab art has the context of Islam, started in the 7th century, is sometimes referred to as Islamic art, although many Arab artists throughout time have not been Muslim. The term "Islamic" refers not only to the religion, but to any form of art created by people in an Islamic culture or in an Islamic context, whether the artist is Islamic or not. Not all Muslims are in agreement on the use of art in religious observance, the proper place of art in society, or the relation between secular art and the demands placed on the secular world to conform to religious precepts.

Islamic art frequently adopts secular elements and elements that are frowned upon, if not forbidden, by some Islamic theologians. Although the often cited opposition in Islam to the depiction of human and animal forms holds true for religious art and architecture, in the secular sphere, such representations have flourished in nearly all Islamic cultures. The Islamic resistance to the representation of living beings ultimately stems from the belief that the creation of living forms is unique to God, and it is for this reason that the role of images and image makers has been controversial. The strongest statements on the subject of figural depiction are made in the Hadith (Traditions of the Prophet), where painters are challenged to "breathe life" into their creations and threatened with punishment on the Day of Judgment. The Qur'an is less specific but condemns idolatry and uses the Arabic term musawwir ("maker of forms," or artist) as an epithet for God. Partially as a result of this religious sentiment, figures in painting were often stylized and, in some cases, the destruction of figurative artworks occurred.

Iconoclasm was previously known in the Byzantine period and aniconicism was a feature of the Judaic world, thus placing the Islamic objection to figurative representations within a larger context. As ornament, however, figures were largely devoid of any larger significance and perhaps therefore posed less challenge.

Human portrayals can be found in early Islamic cultures with varying degrees of acceptance by religious authorities. Human representation for the purpose of worship is uniformly considered idolatry as forbidden in Sharia law.

Arabic is written from right to left, like other Semitic scripts, and consists of 17 characters, which, with the addition of dots placed above or below certain of them, provide the 28 letters of the Arabic alphabet. Short vowels are not included in the alphabet, being indicated by signs placed above or below the consonant or long vowel that they follow. Certain characters may be joined to their neighbours, others to the preceding one only, and others to the succeeding one only. The written letters undergo a slight external change according to their position within a word. When they stand alone or occur at the end of a word, they ordinarily terminate in a bold stroke; when they appear in the middle of a word, they are ordinarily joined to the letter following by a small, upward curved stroke. With the exception of six letters, which can be joined only to the preceding ones, the initial and medial letters are much abbreviated, while the final form consists of the initial form with a triumphant flourish. The essential part of the characters, however, remains unchanged.

==== Chinese aesthetics ====
Chinese art has a long history of varied styles and emphases. Confucius emphasized the role of the arts and humanities (especially music and poetry) in broadening human nature and aiding li (etiquette, the rites) in bringing us back to what is essential about humanity. His opponent Mozi, however, argued that music and fine arts were classist and wasteful, benefiting the rich over the poor. By the 4th century AD artists had started debating in writing over the proper goals of art as well. Gu Kaizhi has left three surviving books on the theory of painting.

Several later artists or scholars both created art and wrote about the creation of it. Religious and philosophical influences on art were common (and diverse) but never universal. Modern Chinese aesthetic theory took shape during the modernization of China from Empire to republic in early 20th century. Thus thinkers like Kant, Hegel, Marx and Heidegger have all been incorporated into contemporary Chinese aesthetic theory, through philosophers like Li Zehou.

==== Indian aesthetics ====
The Indian aesthetics tradition traces to the Vedic era texts of Hinduism. The Aitareya Brahmana (~1000 BCE) in section 6.27, for example, states the arts are a refinement of the self (atma-samskrti). The oldest surviving complete Sanskrit manuscript that discusses a theory of aesthetics is of Natya Shastra, estimated to have been complete between 200 BCE and 200 CE. This theory is called rasa in the text. Rasa is an ancient concept in Indian arts about the aesthetic flavor of any visual, literary or musical work, that evokes an emotion or feeling in the reader or audience, but that cannot be described. According to the Natya shastra, the goal of arts is to empower aesthetic experience, deliver emotional rasa (juice, taste). In many cases, art aims to produce repose and relief for those exhausted with labor, or distraught with grief, or laden with misery, or struck by austere times. Yet entertainment is an effect, but not the primary goal of arts according to Natya shastra. The primary goal is to create rasa so as to lift and transport the spectators, unto the expression of ultimate reality and transcendent values.

The most complete exposition of aesthetics in drama, songs and other performance arts is found in the works of the Kashmiri Shaivite-Hindu philosopher Abhinavagupta (c. 1000 CE). Abhinavagupta's analysis of Natyasastra is notable for its extensive discussion of aesthetic and ontological questions.

The concept of rasa is fundamental to many forms of Indian arts including dance, music, theatre, painting, sculpture, and literature, the interpretation and implementation of a particular rasa differs between different styles and schools. In Indian classical music, each raga is an inspired creation for a specific mood, where the musician or ensemble creates the rasa in the listener.

In the aesthetic theories of Indian poetics, its ancient scholars discuss both what is stated and how it is stated (words, grammar, rhythm), suggesting that the meaning of the text and the experience of rasa are both important. Among the most celebrated in Hindu traditions on the theory of poetics and literary works, are 5th-century Bhartrhari and the 9th-century Anandavardhana, but the theoretical tradition on integrating rasa into literary artworks likely goes back to a more ancient period. This is generally discussed under the Indian concepts of Dhvani, Sabdatattva and Sphota.

In the Indian theories on sculpture and architecture (Shilpa Shastras), the rasa theories, in part, drive the forms, shapes, arrangements and expressions in images and structures.

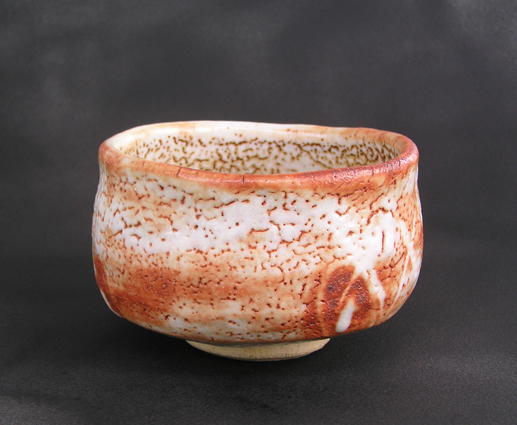
Japanese pottery and porcelain are often made according to wabi-sabi.

==== Japanese aesthetics ====
An important concept in Japanese aesthetics is wabi-sabi, representing a particular aesthetic philosophy that values the beauty of the simple, irregular, and impermanent. It finds beauty in what is naturally aged and imperfect. The term "wabi" refers to solitude and simplicity, while "sabi" describes the beauty that comes with age and patina. Emptiness, or "sabi," is also a significant aspect of wabi-sabi. It involves a space or pause in a composition that gives the observer time to reflect and contemplate. Emptiness is an important aesthetic principle in Japanese art and is also linked to the Zen Buddhism philosophy of presence and awareness. Minimalism is a prominent aspect of Japanese aesthetics, focusing on reducing to the essentials and simplifying, which can be seen in Japanese architecture, design, and art.

A crucial part of wabi-sabi is embracing impermanence and aging. Objects displaying the marks of age, such as cracks, stains, and patina, are considered beautiful because they tell the story of the object's history and lived life. This concept holds aesthetic significance and is evident in many forms of Japanese art and craftsmanship, such as ceramics and woodcarving. Wabi-sabi also includes an aesthetics of balance and asymmetry. Instead of striving for perfect symmetry, asymmetrical and irregular forms are appreciated, both in art and garden design, where the aim is to create a natural sense of movement and balance.

=== Oceania ===
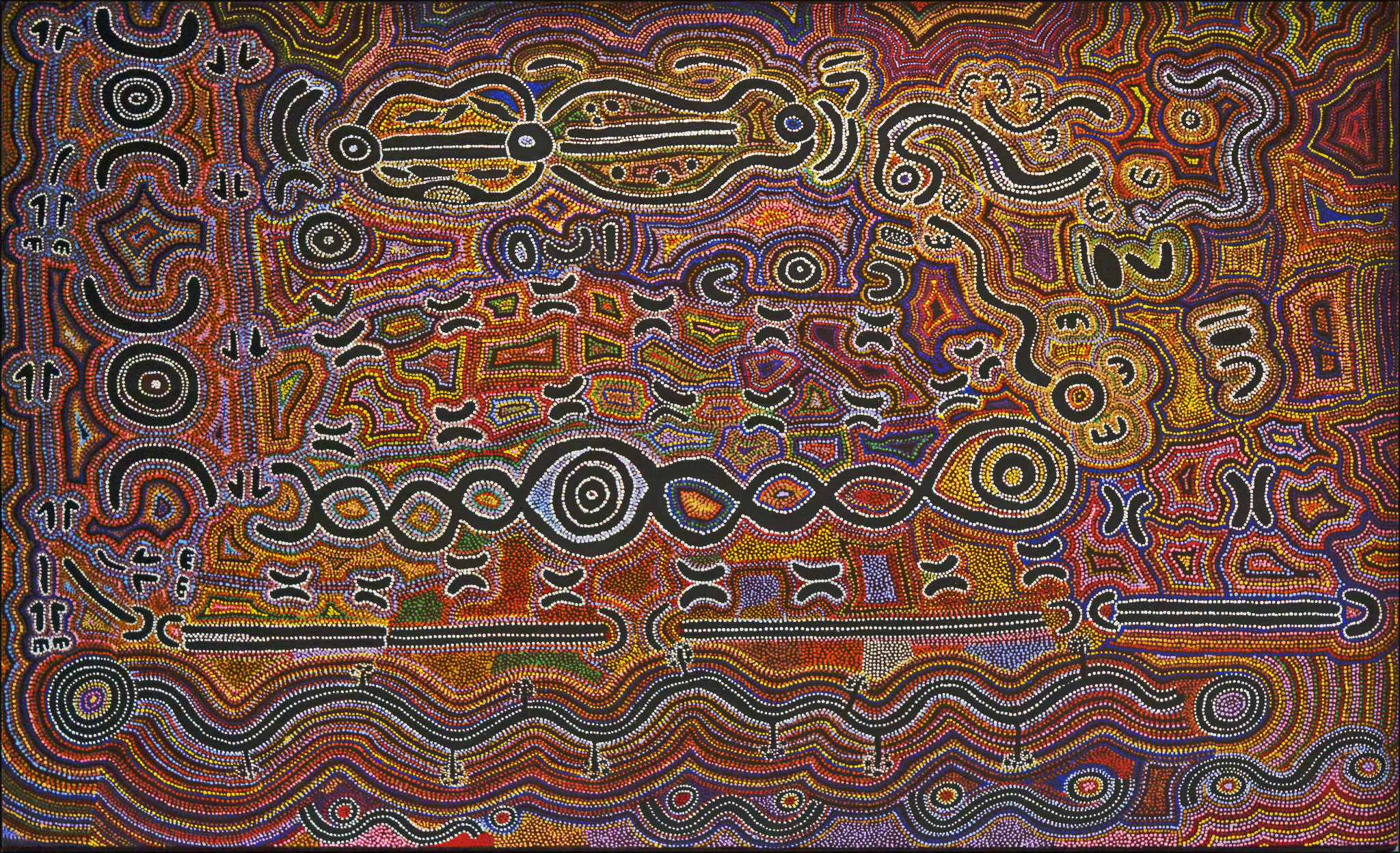
Aboriginal religious painting.

==== Aboriginal aesthetics ====
Dadirri is a concept originating from Aboriginal cultures in northern Australia, particularly Arnhem Land. It describes a deep and silent practice of listening and reflection to connect with the land and spirituality. Dadirri is a form of aesthetics that involves appreciating the beauty and significance of nature and spirituality through being silent and receptive. It includes appreciating the natural patterns, colors, sounds, and shapes that surround us. This aesthetic dimension involves seeing beauty in the simple and everyday. For many Aboriginal cultures, art is a means of expressing dadirri. Many Aboriginal artworks, including paintings, baskets, ceramics, and textiles, reflect the beauty and spirituality of nature and the land. These artworks are not only aesthetically pleasing but also carry deep symbolic and spiritual meanings.

Dadirri is also about feeling a deeper connection with nature and the spiritual dimension of existence. This connection goes beyond the purely physical and extends to the aesthetic experience of being part of something larger than oneself. It is about experiencing an aesthetically satisfying spiritual presence.

=== Western aesthetics ===
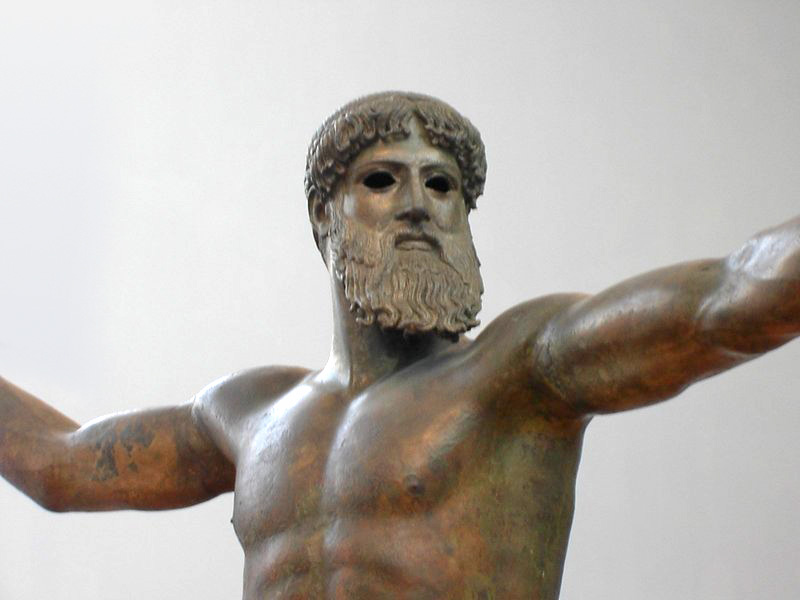
Bronze sculpture, thought to be either Poseidon or Zeus, National Archaeological Museum of Athens

Western aesthetics usually refers to Greek philosophers as the earliest source of formal aesthetic considerations. Plato believed in beauty as a form in which beautiful objects partake and which causes them to be beautiful. He felt that beautiful objects incorporated proportion, harmony, and unity among their parts. Similarly, in the Metaphysics, Aristotle found that the universal elements of beauty were order, symmetry, and definiteness.

Cubist painting by Georges Braque, Violin and Candlestick (1910)

From the late 17th to the early 20th century Western aesthetics underwent a slow revolution into what is often called modernism. German and British thinkers emphasized beauty as the key component of art and of the aesthetic experience, and saw art as necessarily aiming at absolute beauty.

For Alexander Gottlieb Baumgarten aesthetics is the science of the sense experiences, a younger sister of logic, and beauty is thus the most perfect kind of knowledge that sense experience can have. For Immanuel Kant the aesthetic experience of beauty is a judgment of a subjective but similar human truth, since all people should agree that "this rose is beautiful" if it in fact is. However, beauty cannot be reduced to any more basic set of features. For Friedrich Schiller aesthetic appreciation of beauty is the most perfect reconciliation of the sensual and rational parts of human nature.

For Friedrich Wilhelm Joseph Schelling, the philosophy of art is the "organon" of philosophy concerning the relation between man and nature. So aesthetics began now to be the name for the philosophy of art. Friedrich von Schlegel, August Wilhelm Schlegel, Friedrich Schleiermacher and Georg Wilhelm Friedrich Hegel also gave lectures on aesthetics as philosophy of art after 1800.

For Hegel, all culture is a matter of "absolute spirit" coming to be manifest to itself, stage by stage, changing to a perfection that only philosophy can approach. Art is the first stage in which the absolute spirit is manifest immediately to sense-perception, and is thus an objective rather than subjective revelation of beauty.

For Arthur Schopenhauer aesthetic contemplation of beauty is the most free that the pure intellect can be from the dictates of will; here we contemplate perfection of form without any kind of worldly agenda, and thus any intrusion of utility or politics would ruin the point of the beauty. It is thus for Schopenhauer one way to fight the suffering.

The British were largely divided into intuitionist and analytic camps. The intuitionists believed that aesthetic experience was disclosed by a single mental faculty of some kind. For Anthony Ashley-Cooper, 3rd Earl of Shaftesbury this was identical to the moral sense, beauty just is the sensory version of moral goodness. For Ludwig Wittgenstein aesthetics consisted in the description of a whole culture which is a linguistic impossibility. Hence his viewpoint can be paraphrased as "That which constitutes aesthetics lies outside the realm of the language game".

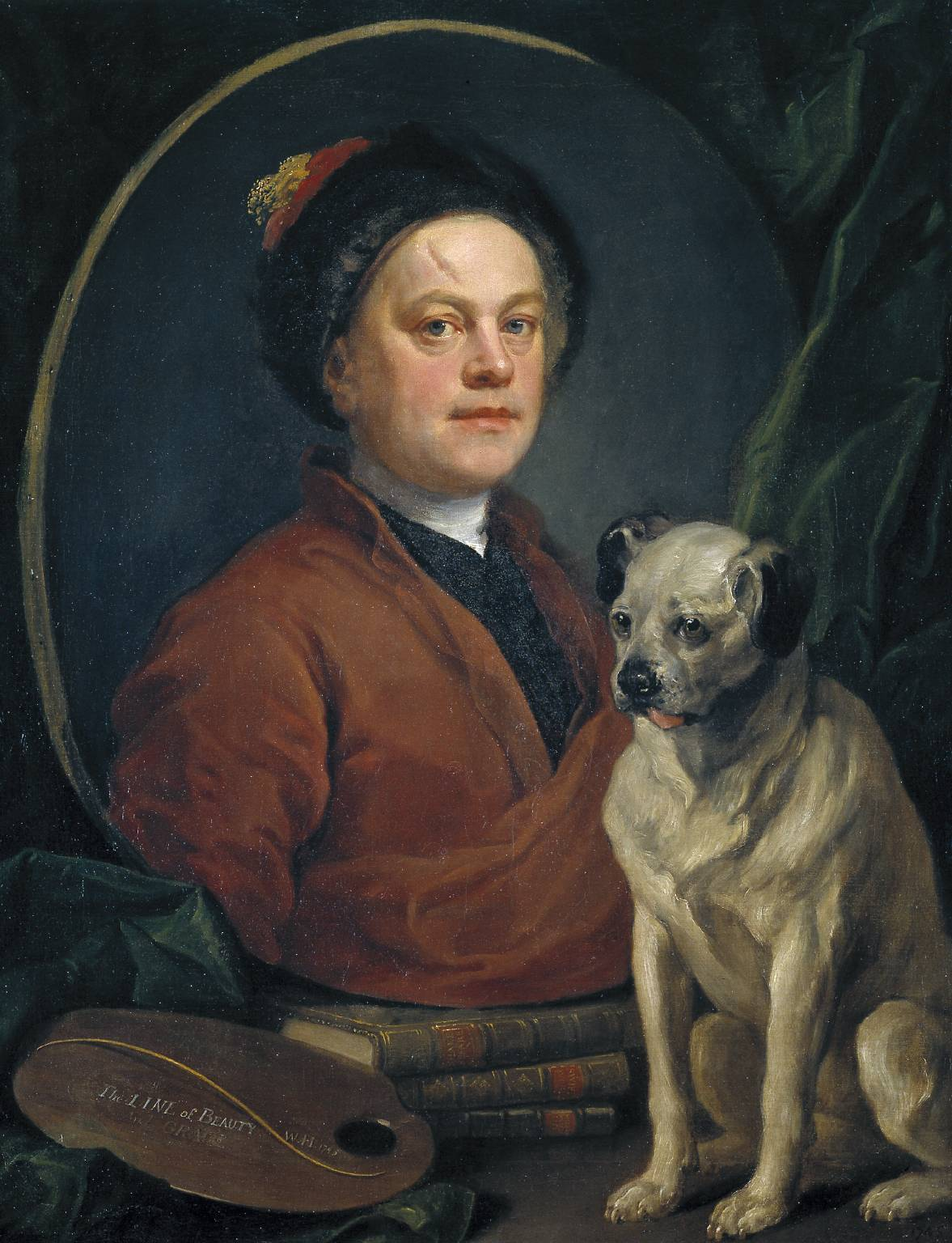
William Hogarth, self-portrait, 1745

For Oscar Wilde, the contemplation of beauty for beauty's sake (augmented by John Ruskin's search for moral grounding) was more than the foundation for much of his literary career; he once stated, "Aestheticism is a search after the signs of the beautiful. It is the science of the beautiful through which men seek the correlation of the arts. It is, to speak more exactly, the search after the secret of life.".

Wilde toured the United States in 1882 spreading the idea of Aesthetics in a speech called "The English Renaissance". In his speech he proposed that Beauty and Aesthetics were "not languid but energetic. By beautifying the outward aspects of life, one would beautify the inner ones." The English Renaissance was, he said, "like the Italian Renaissance before it, a sort of rebirth of the spirit of man".

For Francis Hutcheson beauty is disclosed by an inner mental sense, but is a subjective fact rather than an objective one. Analytic theorists like Henry Home, Lord Kames, William Hogarth, and Edmund Burke hoped to reduce beauty to some list of attributes. Hogarth, for example, thinks that beauty consists of (1) fitness of the parts to some design; (2) variety in as many ways as possible; (3) uniformity, regularity or symmetry, which is only beautiful when it helps to preserve the character of fitness; (4) simplicity or distinctness, which gives pleasure not in itself, but through its enabling the eye to enjoy variety with ease; (5) intricacy, which provides employment for our active energies, leading the eye on "a wanton kind of chase"; and (6) quantity or magnitude, which draws our attention and produces admiration and awe. Later analytic aestheticians strove to link beauty to some scientific theory of psychology (such as James Mill) or biology (such as Herbert Spencer).

== See also ==
- Aesthetics
- Mathematics and art

== Bibliography ==
- Wallace Dace (1963). "The Concept of "Rasa" in Sanskrit Dramatic Theory". Educational Theatre Journal. 15 (3): 249–254. doi:10.2307/3204783. JSTOR 3204783.
- Paul Guyer, A History of Modern Aesthetics, Cambridge, Cambridge University Press, 2014 (Vol. 1ː The Eighteenth Century; Vol. 2ː The Nineteenth Century; Vol. 3ː The Twentieth Century).
- Ananda Lal (2004). The Oxford Companion to Indian Theatre. Oxford University Press. ISBN 978-0-19-564446-3.
- Natalia Lidova (2014). "Natyashastra". Oxford University Press. doi:10.1093/obo/9780195399318-0071.
- Tarla Mehta (1995). Sanskrit Play Production in Ancient India. Motilal Banarsidass. ISBN 978-81-208-1057-0.
- Emmie Te Nijenhuis (1974). Indian Music: History and Structure. BRILL Academic. ISBN 90-04-03978-3.
- Rowell, Lewis (2015). Music and Musical Thought in Early India. University of Chicago Press. ISBN 978-0-226-73034-9.
- Wladyslaw Tatarkiewicz, History of Aesthetics, The Hague, Mouton, 1970 (Vol 1ː Ancient Aesthetics; Vol. 2ː Medieval Aesthetics; Vol. 3ː Modern Aesthetics).
