= Brennilis Parish close =

Coordinates: 48.3570°N 3.8505°W

The Brennilis Parish close (Enclos paroissial) comprising the Église Notre-Dame and a Calvary sculpted by Roland Doré (sculptor) is located in the arrondissement of Châteaulin in Finistère in Brittany in north-western France. The name Brennilis is made up of two Breton words- "Bren" means a hill and "iliz" means a church. Brennilis stands at the foot of Brasparts' Mont Saint-Michel in the Monts d'Arrée. The Église Notre Dame dates to 1485 according to an inscription near the main altar which reads "Yves Toux, procureur, l'an 1485, commencement de cette chapelle".

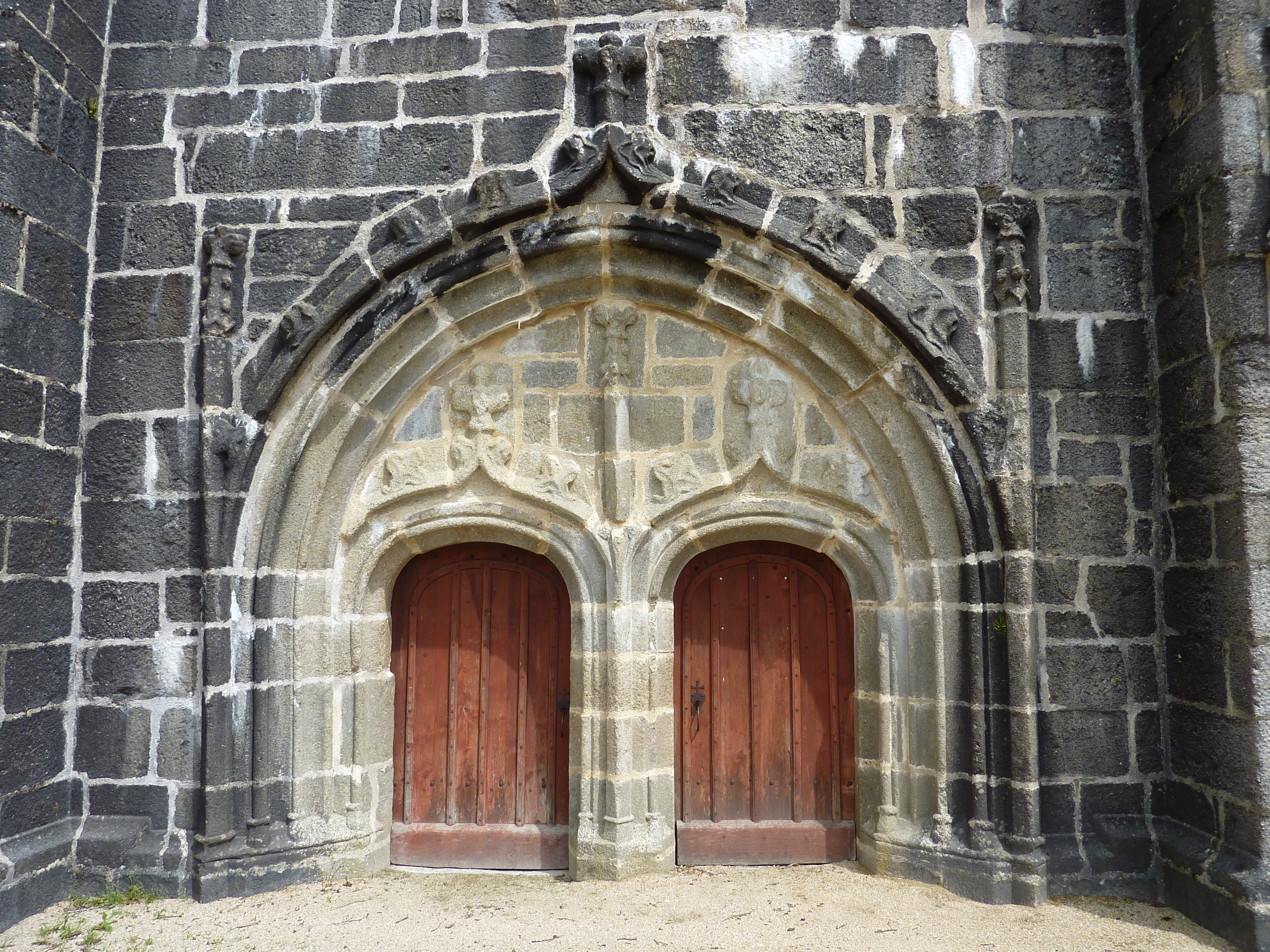
The west door of the church

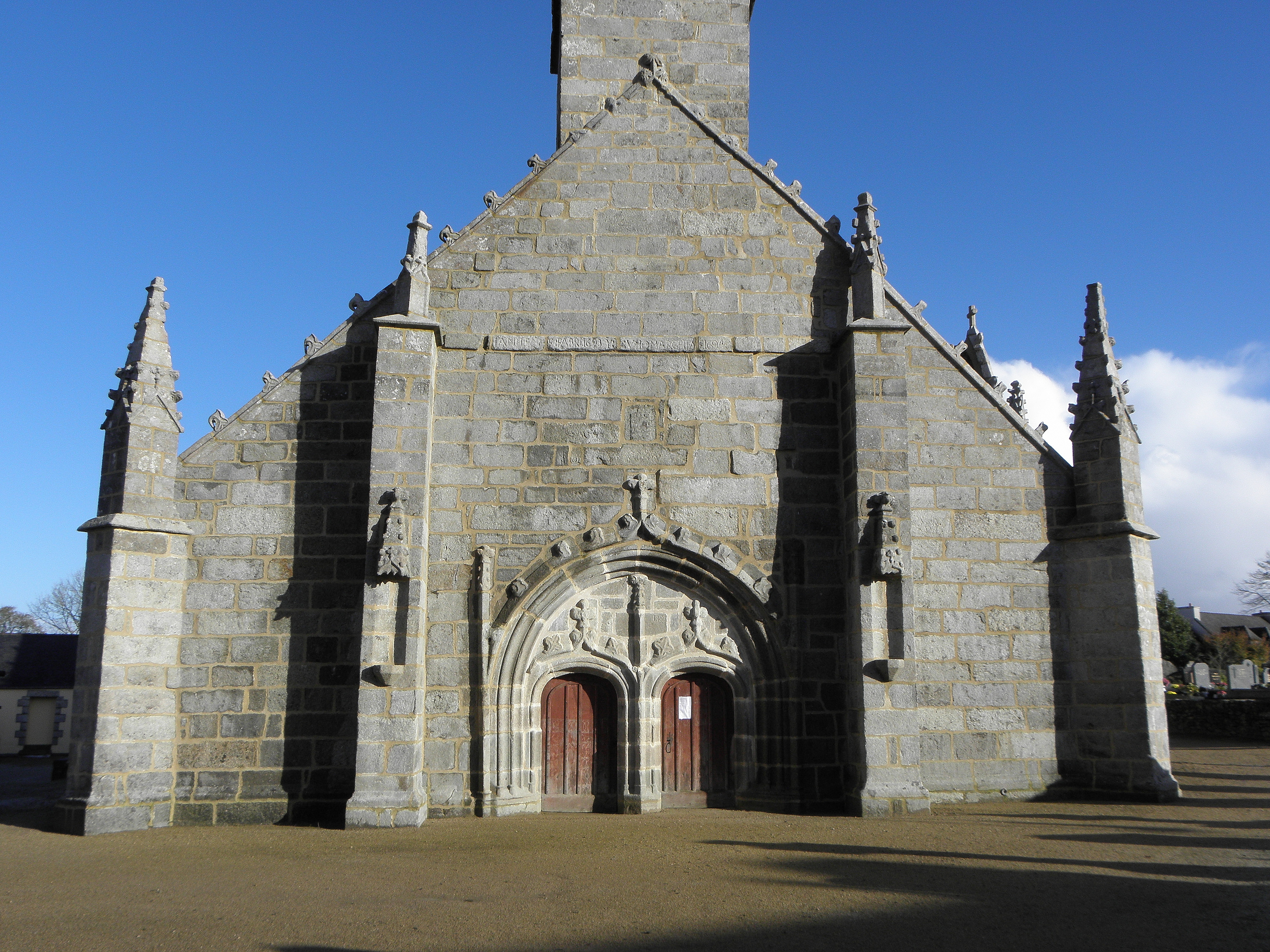
The western side of the church

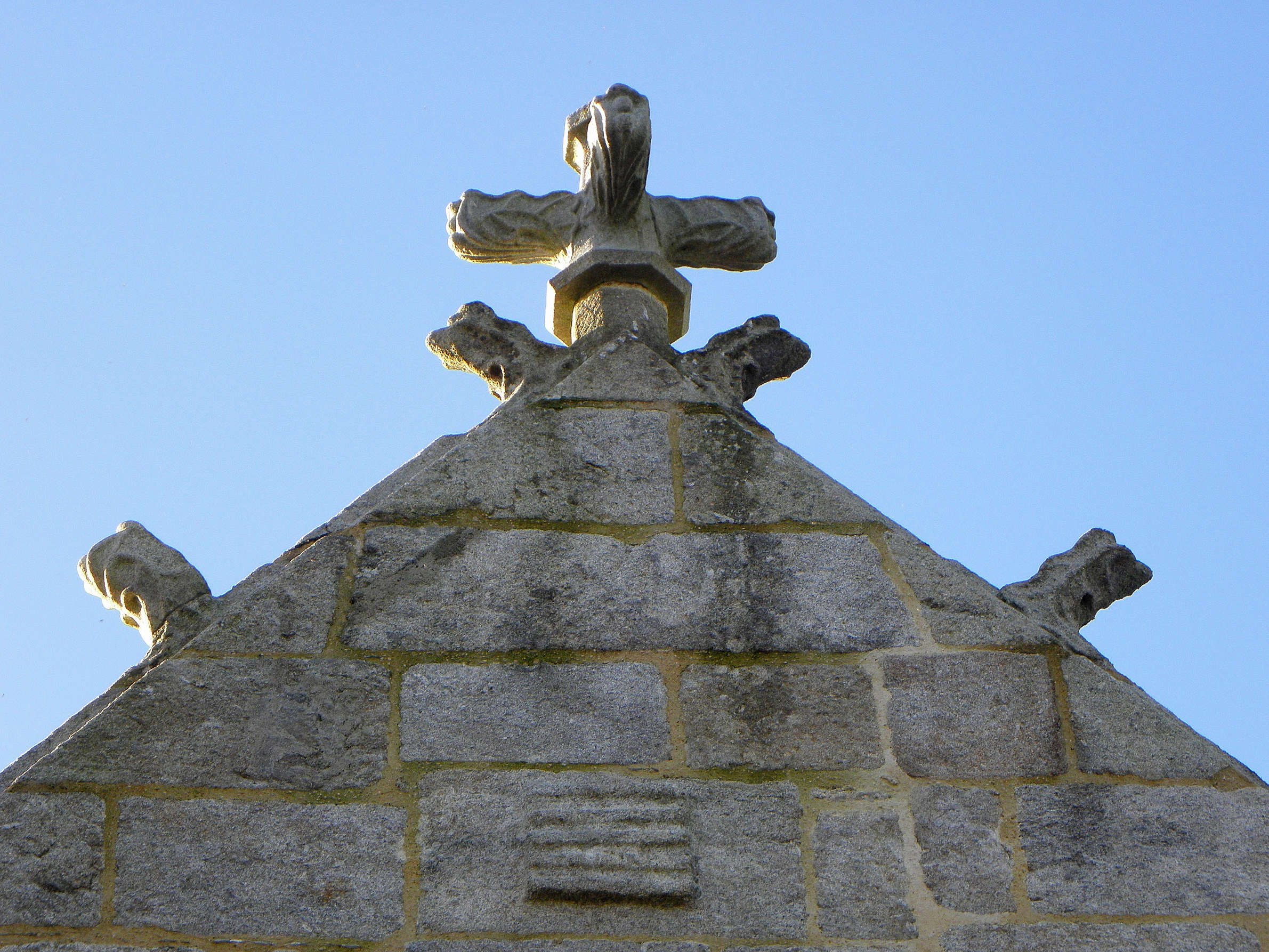
The top of the chevet gable

== Niche with shuttered doors ==
On the corner of the epistle side of the altar there is a statue of the Virgin Mary. The statue stands on the crescent of a moon and below is a bust of Eve holding the fatal apple. This statue is held within a shuttered niche, the shutters being painted with depictions of the Annunciation Sainte Geneviève, Sainte Apolline and others.

The church comprises a nave with aisles of four bays and a transept. The church dates mainly from the late fifteenth century but was rebuilt several times. The west gable, whose twin doors date from the sixteenth century, was radically changed in 1694 and restored in 1862 and in 1955. Above the gate, we see the arms of Quélen with the dates 1693 and 1694 above them.

The main stained glass window depicts the life of the Virgin Mary and dates to the 16th-century and has eight scenes: the presentation in the temple, the Annunciation, her marriage, the Visitation, the Nativity, the visit of the three wise men, the circumcision and the Flight into Egypt.

== The Sibyls ==
At the altar by the lower south side of the church are bas-reliefs representing the 12 Sibyls.

== Processional cross ==
The church has a beautiful processional cross dating to 1650.

== The altar-piece of the main altar ==
This altar-piece is decorated with seven bas-relief panels depicting the Annunciation, the Visitation, the Nativity, an angel announcing the news of Jesus' birth to the shepherds, the Adoration of the Magi, the circumcision and the Assumption. In the annunciation scene the Virgin Mary is kneeling at a prie-Dieu and the Angel Gabriel carries a sceptre and a banner inscribed with the words "Ave Maria Dominus tecum". In the visitation Elizabeth kneels before her cousin the Virgin Mary and Zechariah (priest) is advancing towards them. In the Nativity the Virgin Mary and Joseph kneel before the baby Jesus with an angel placed between them. To the rear the cow and the ass are shown. The scene is set not in a stable but the ruins of the old palace of David. In the scene depicting the angel appearing to the shepherds, the angel appears standing in a cloud and she has a banner inscribed "Gloria in excelsis Deo". Three shepherds are shown, two asleep and one just waking up. In the scene showing the appearance of the three wise men the Virgin Mary is seated with baby Jesus on her lap. Joseph stands behind her. The first king has taken off his crown and kneels before them. He is accompanied by a page. The two other kings, still wearing their crowns, stand holding the gifts they will soon offer to Jesus. In the circumcision scene an old man holds Jesus above a table and the Virgin Mary is kneeling whilst Joseph stands. Two other men stand witnessing the scene. Finally in the depiction of the Assumption, carved on the tabernacle door, the Virgin Mary stands in the clouds surrounded by four angels who help her climb up to heaven. Two of the angels place a crown on her head. The angels are surrounded by depictions of the heads of cherubs. The bas-reliefs are separated by six statuettes.

== Calvary ==
Outside Brennilis' Notre Dame church, we can see Doré's 5 metre high "Croix de calvaire" which dates to 1625 and includes the group "Notre-Dame de Pitié" at the Cross' base. The Cross is located to the north of the church and has the coat of arms ("Blason") of the Quélen family at the base. Doré depicts an angel holding the titulus above Jesus' head. At the base of the pedestal supporting the Cross is the pietà "Notre-Dame de Pitié", with a sword bearing image of the resurrected Christ on the reverse side.

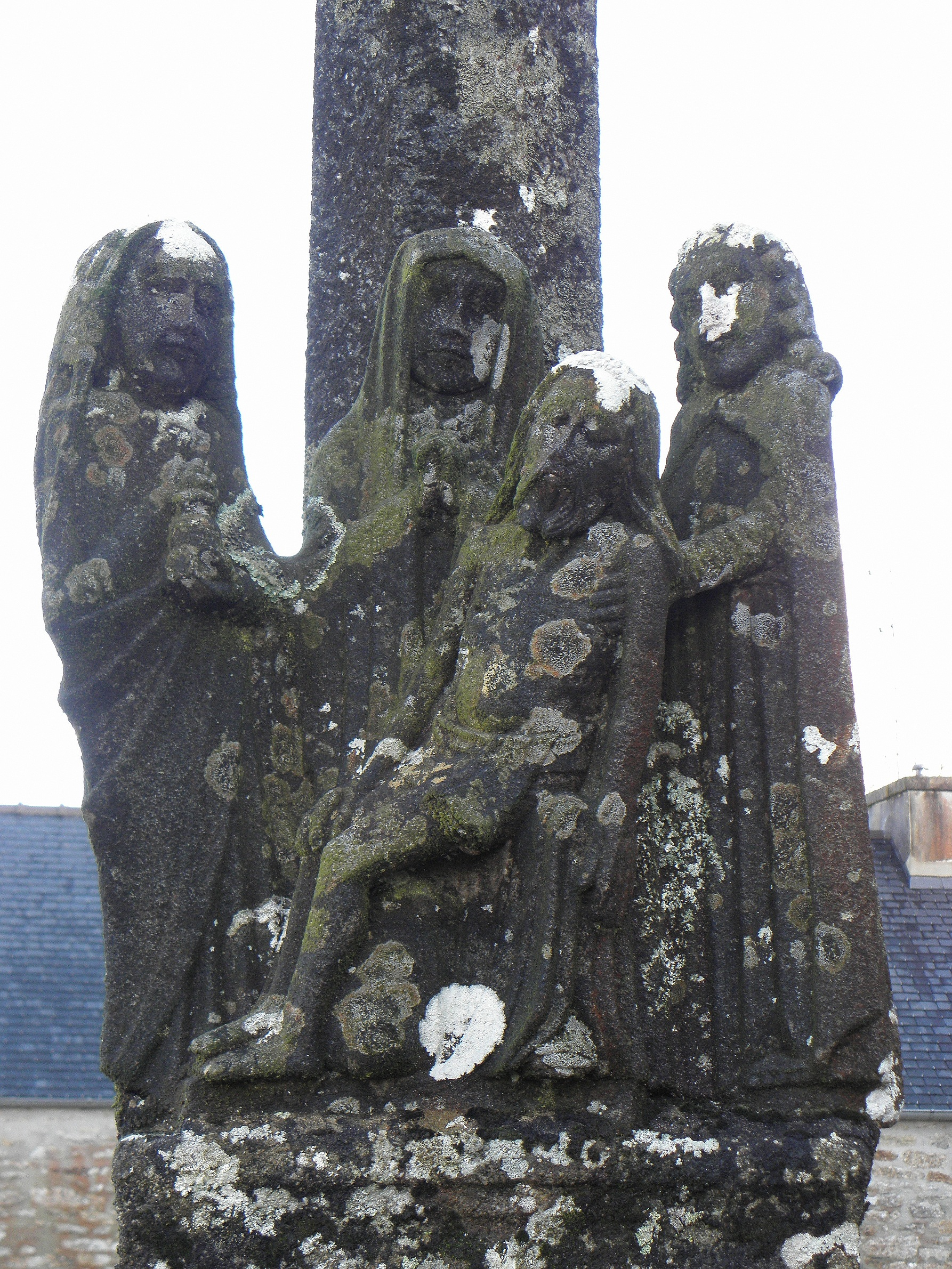
The Doré Calvary at Brennilis. Notre-Dame de Pitié.

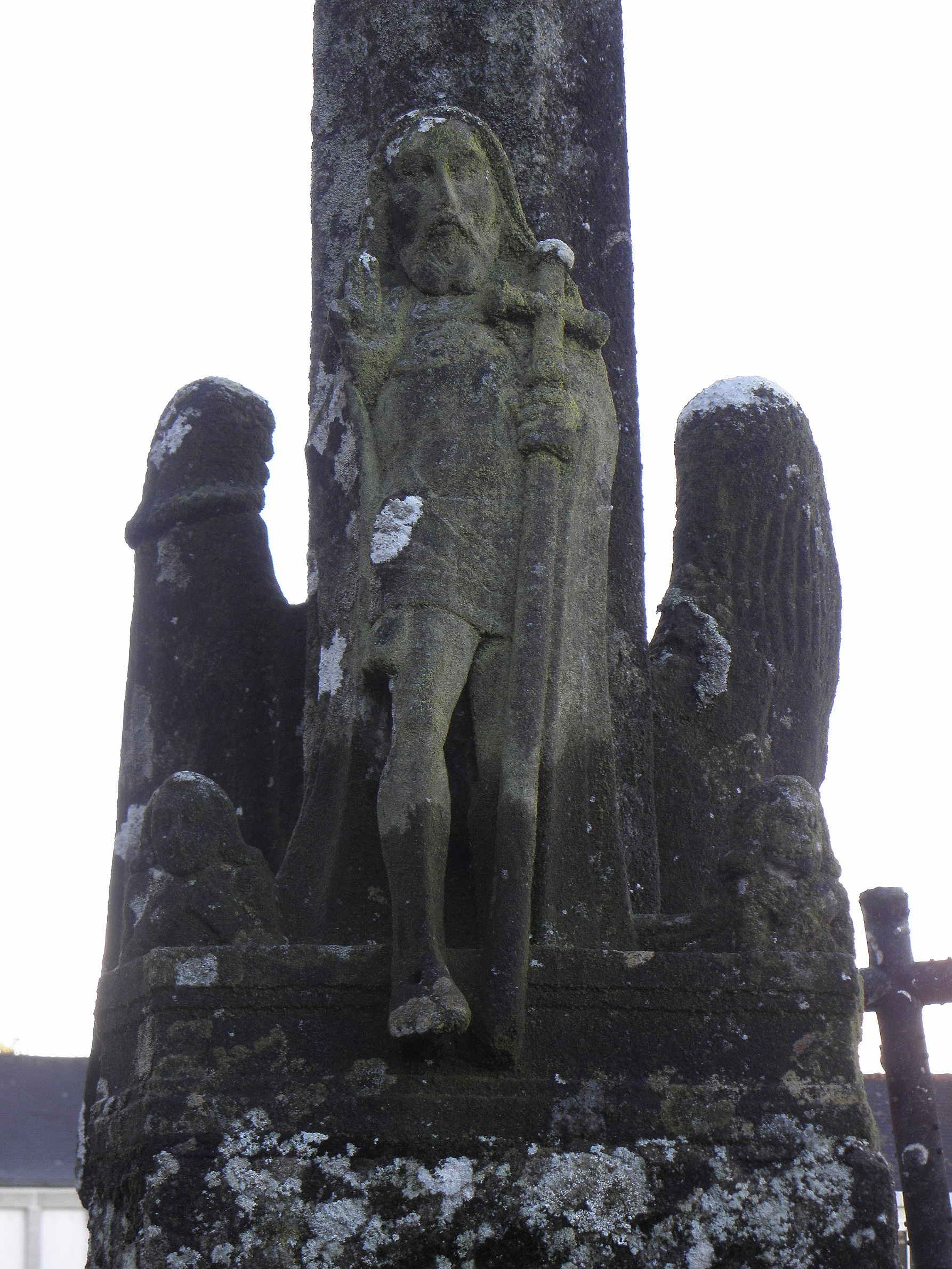
The Doré Calvary at Brennilis. The resurrection.

== The Calvary of Nestavel ==
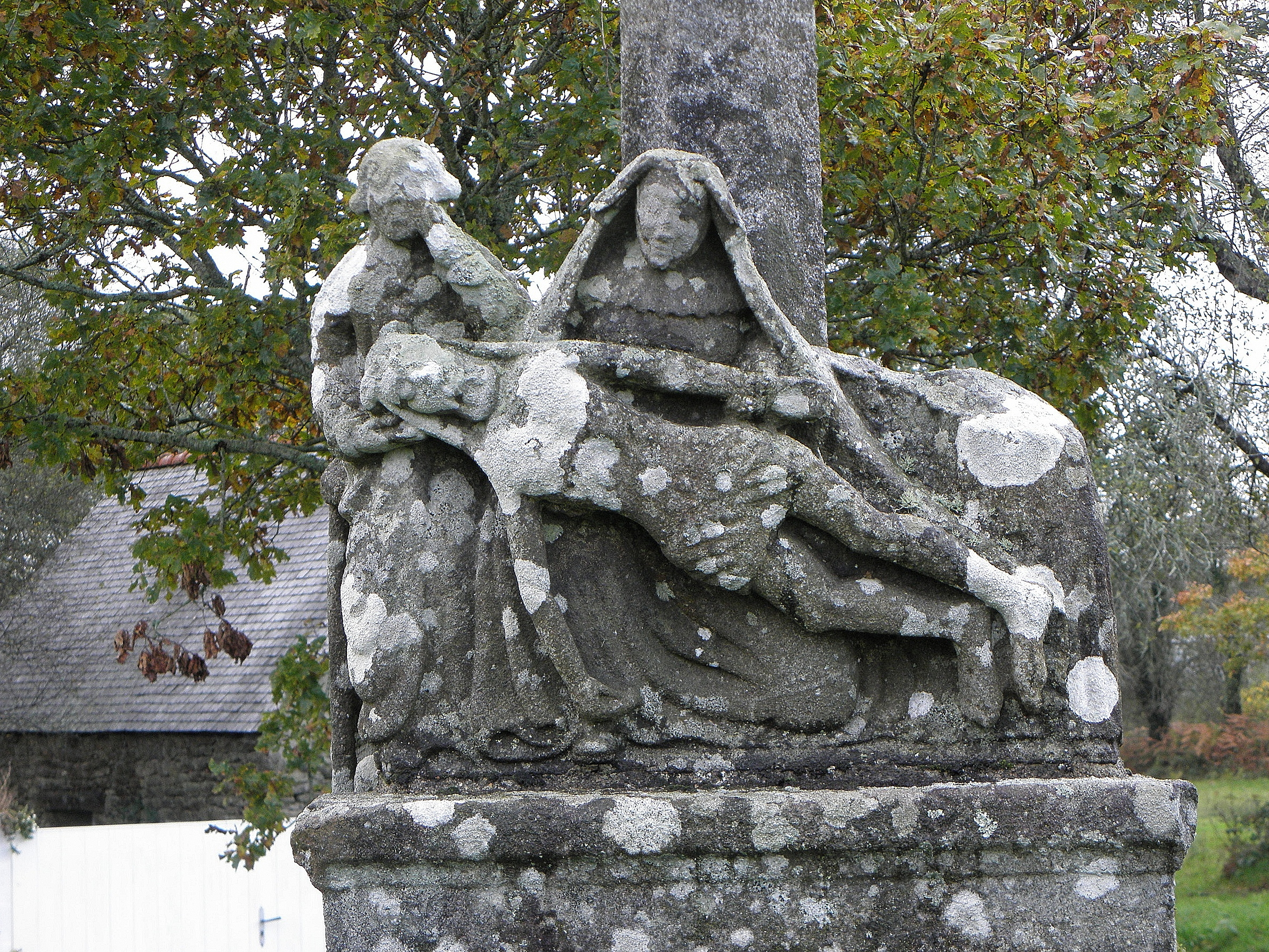
The calvary at Nestavel

This calvary is located near to Brennilis.

== See also ==
- Culture of France
- French architecture
- History of France
- Religion in France
- Roman Catholicism in France
