= Châteaulin =

Châteaulin Kastellin (Breton)
- Subprefecture and commune
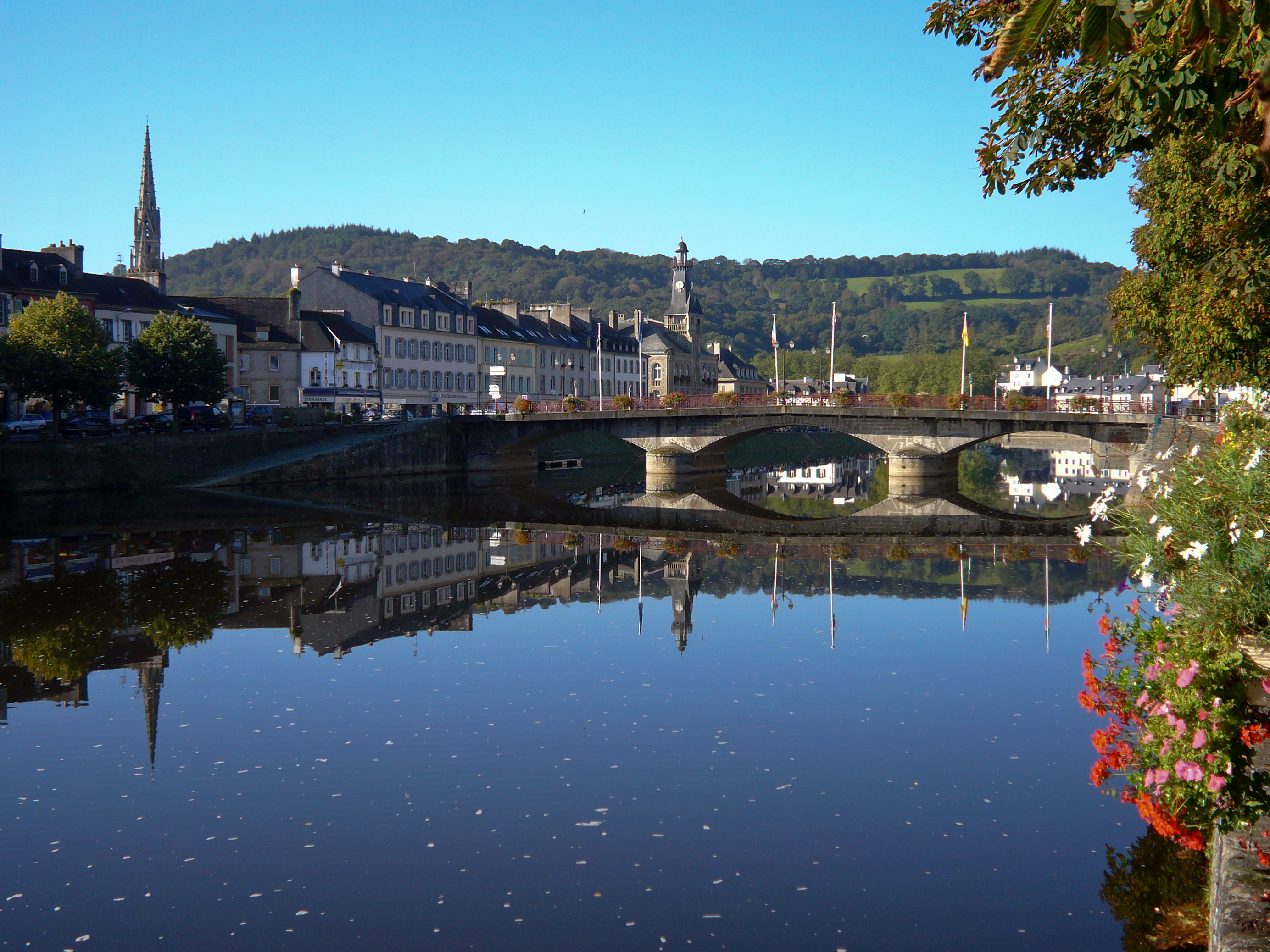
- Châteaulin and the Aulne

- Coat of arms
- Location of Châteaulin
- Location within France Location within Brittany
- Coordinates: 48°11′51″N 4°05′19″W
- Country: France
- Region: Brittany
- Department: Finistère
- Arrondissement: Châteaulin
- Canton: Crozon
- Intercommunality: Pleyben-Châteaulin-Porzay

Government
  - Mayor (2020–2026): Gaëlle Nicolas
- Area^{1}: 20.81 km^{2} (8.03 sq mi)
- Highest elevation: 206 m (676 ft)
- Lowest elevation: 2 m (6.6 ft)
- Population (2023): 5,085
  - Density: 244.4/km^{2} (632.9/sq mi)
- Time zone: UTC+01:00 (CET)
  - Summer (DST): UTC+02:00 (CEST)
- INSEE/Postal code: 29026 /29150
- ^{1} French Land Register data, which excludes lakes, ponds, glaciers > 1 km^{2} (0.386 sq mi or 247 acres) and river estuaries.

Châteaulin (French: [ʃɑtolɛ̃]; Breton: Kastellin) is a commune in the Finistère department and administrative region of Brittany in north-western France. It is a sub-prefecture of the department.

== Geography ==
Châteaulin is in a valley towards the center of Finistère on the River Aulne and the Canal de Nantes à Brest, mid-way between Quimper to the south and Brest to the north. To the west the Menez-Hom hills separate it from the Crozon peninsula and the Bay of Douarnenez, which opens into the Atlantic Ocean.

== Population ==
In French the inhabitants of Châteaulin are known as Châteaulinois.

Historical population

| Year | Pop. | ±% p.a. |
|---|---|---|
| 1793 | 2,514 | — |
| 1800 | 3,172 | +3.38% |
| 1806 | 3,161 | −0.06% |
| 1821 | 2,426 | −1.75% |
| 1831 | 2,783 | +1.38% |
| 1836 | 2,968 | +1.30% |
| 1841 | 2,548 | −3.01% |
| 1846 | 2,790 | +1.83% |
| 1851 | 2,849 | +0.42% |
| 1856 | 2,852 | +0.02% |
| 1861 | 2,892 | +0.28% |
| 1866 | 3,259 | +2.42% |
| 1872 | 3,339 | +0.41% |
| 1876 | 3,436 | +0.72% |
| 1881 | 3,462 | +0.15% |
| 1886 | 3,656 | +1.10% |
| 1891 | 3,677 | +0.11% |
| 1896 | 3,857 | +0.96% |
| 1901 | 3,874 | +0.09% |

| Year | Pop. | ±% p.a. |
|---|---|---|
| 1906 | 4,237 | +1.81% |
| 1911 | 4,271 | +0.16% |
| 1921 | 4,005 | −0.64% |
| 1926 | 3,766 | −1.22% |
| 1931 | 3,615 | −0.82% |
| 1936 | 3,702 | +0.48% |
| 1946 | 3,954 | +0.66% |
| 1954 | 3,958 | +0.01% |
| 1962 | 4,096 | +0.43% |
| 1968 | 4,370 | +1.09% |
| 1975 | 4,711 | +1.08% |
| 1982 | 5,357 | +1.85% |
| 1990 | 4,965 | −0.95% |
| 1999 | 5,157 | +0.42% |
| 2007 | 5,298 | +0.34% |
| 2012 | 5,181 | −0.45% |
| 2017 | 5,214 | +0.13% |
| 2023 | 5,085 | −0.42% |

Source: EHESS and INSEE (1968-2023)

== Breton language ==
In 2008 1.96% of primary-school children attended bilingual schools.

== Economy ==
Châteaulin's economy is based on food processing (salmon and poultry) and, to an ever-greater extent, tourism. The Gendarmerie school on the outskirts of the town provides for a large number of families and the many recruits passing through the school provide the economic backbone of the town's night-life.

== Personalities ==
- Yves Marie André, better known as le Père André (1675–1764), Jesuit priest and philosopher.
- 27 November 1761 : Birth of Julien Marie Cosmao-Kerjulien (died in Brest 17 February 1825), Rear-Admiral and Baron d'Empire.
- Jean Moulin, emblem of the French Resistance during the Second World War, was the sub-prefect from 1930 to 1933.
- Henri Ernest Ponthier de Chamaillard, usually known as Ernest de Chamaillard, (9 December 1862, Gourlizon – 1931, Eaubonne) was a French artist, one of a group of painters who gathered in the Breton village of Pont-Aven. He was a friend and student of Paul Gauguin. In 1893, unable to make a living from his painting, he moved to Châteaulin behind Église Saint-Idunet where he worked as a lawyer until 1905.

== International relations ==
Châteaulin is twinned with:

- (Republic of Ireland) - Clonakilty, County Cork, Ireland.
- - Grimmen, Mecklenburg-Vorpommern, Germany

== See also ==
- Cantons of the Finistère department
- Communes of the Finistère department
- Arrondissements of the Finistère department
- Parc naturel régional d'Armorique
- Brennilis Parish close

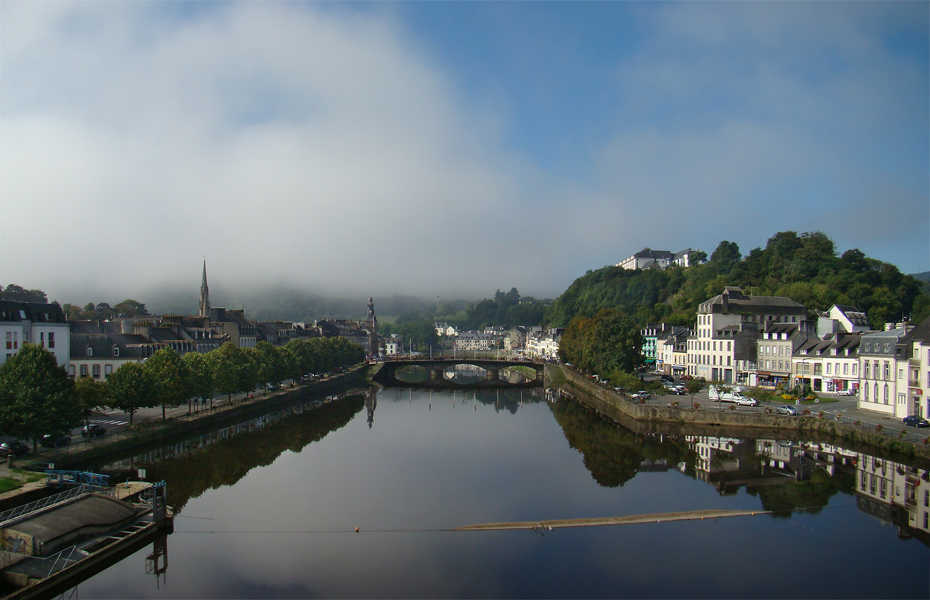
Morning fog over the Aulne river
