= Yves Marie André =

Yves-Marie André
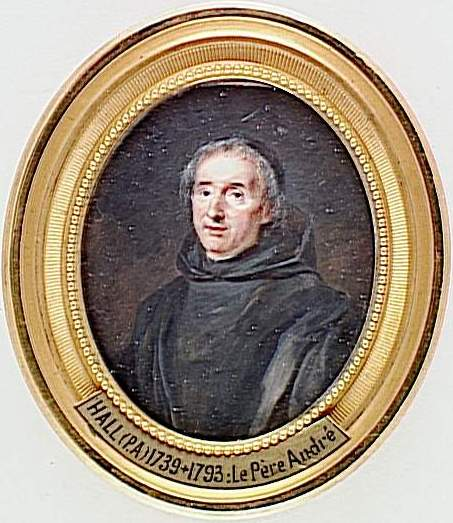
- Born: May 22, 1675; Châteaulin, Finistère
- Died: February 26, 1764 (aged 88); Caen, Calvados
- Other name: le Père André

Philosophical work
- Era: 18th-century philosophy
- Region: French philosophy
- Main interests: Aesthetics

Yves Marie André (1675–1764), also known as le Père André, was a French Jesuit mathematician, philosopher, and essayist.

André entered the Society of Jesus in 1693. Although distinguished in his scholastic studies, he adhered to Gallicanism and Jansenism and was thus considered unsuitable for responsible office by Church authorities. He therefore pursued scientific studies and became royal professor of mathematics at Caen.

He is best known for his Essai sur le Beau (Essay on Beauty), a 1741 philosophical work on aesthetics, which made him famous at the time and remained a well-known work into the 19th century.
