= Saint-Mathieu =

Saint-Mathieu (French for Saint Matthew) may refer to:

== Places ==
=== France ===
- Saint-Mathieu, Haute-Vienne
- Saint-Mathieu-de-Tréviers, Hérault
- Pointe Saint-Mathieu, a headland in Brittany

=== Canada ===
- Saint-Mathieu, Quebec
- Saint-Mathieu-de-Beloeil, Quebec
- Saint-Mathieu-d'Harricana, Quebec
- Saint-Mathieu-du-Parc, Quebec

== Buildings and structures ==
- Abbaye Saint-Mathieu de Fine-Terre, a former Breton monastery at Pointe Saint-Mathieu, Brittany
- Saint-Mathieu Lighthouse, at Pointe Saint-Mathieu, Brittany
- Saint-Mathieu-de-Beloeil Aerodrome, Quebec
- Saint-Mathieu-de-Laprairie Aerodrome, Quebec

== Other ==
- Battle of Saint-Mathieu (10 August 1512), part of the War of the League of Cambrai

== See also ==
- San Mateo (disambiguation)
- Sant Mateu (disambiguation)
- São Mateus (disambiguation)
