= Miriam Astruc =

French archaeologist (1904–1963)

- Born: 12 November 1904; Bordeaux, France
- Died: 8 April 1963 (aged 58); Petra, Jordan
- Burial place: Amman, Jordan
- Education: École du Louvre
- Occupation: Archaeologist
- Known for: Phoenician-Punic studies

Miriam Astruc, also spelled Myriam Astruc, (born 12 November 1904 – 8 April 1963) was a French archaeologist who specialized in the study of the Phoenician and Punic presence in Spain.

== Biography ==
Miriam Astruc was born in Bordeaux, France, into a Jewish banking family. From 1927 to 1932, Astruc studied Oriental Archaeology and Semitic epigraphy in Paris at the École du Louvre under René Dussaud.

=== Career ===
She went to Spain for the first time as a student at the École des hautes études hispaniques et ibérique with a scholarship from the French government. During the academic years 1931–32, 1932–33 and 1933–34 she worked as an assistant at the School of Advanced Hispanic Studies in Madrid, Spain (Casa de Velázquez) and began her research on the Punians with Luis Siret in the necropolis of Villaricos in the province of Almería. In 1932, together with Pelayo Quintero, she took part in excavations near the Cerro de los Mártires near San Fernando in the province of Cádiz. In 1935 she was appointed head of excavations in Jijel, Algeria by the Algerian Antiquities Administration and discovered around twenty new tombs. She then continued her scientific training in London, Brussels and Amsterdam.

During World War II, Astruc was able to save her elderly Jewish parents from almost certain extermination during the German occupation of France. During this time, all of her research papers were burned, with the exception of her research manuscript on Villaricos, which was awarded the Duseigneur Prize of the Académie des inscriptions et belles-lettres in 1941. Later it was published in the Reports and Memoirs of the General Commission of Archaeological Excavations.

After the War, in 1951, Miriam Astruc returned to Spain with a scholarship from the Casa de Velázquez and stayed until 1954 to study the Punic collections in various Spanish museums. In Ibiza, together with José María Mañá, director of the Museo Arqueológico de Ibiza and specialist in Punic culture, she resumed the excavations at Illa Plana, the necropolis of Puig des Molins and Sant Mateu d'Albarca. They were particularly interested in ancient Egyptian scarabs and the shells of ostrich eggs as grave objects favored by the Punic people.

After conducting her research along the coasts of the Mediterranean Sea, Astruc settled in Paris at the end of the 1950s as a member of the French National Centre for Scientific Research (CNRS) and focused on the Oriental world.

=== Flash flood ===
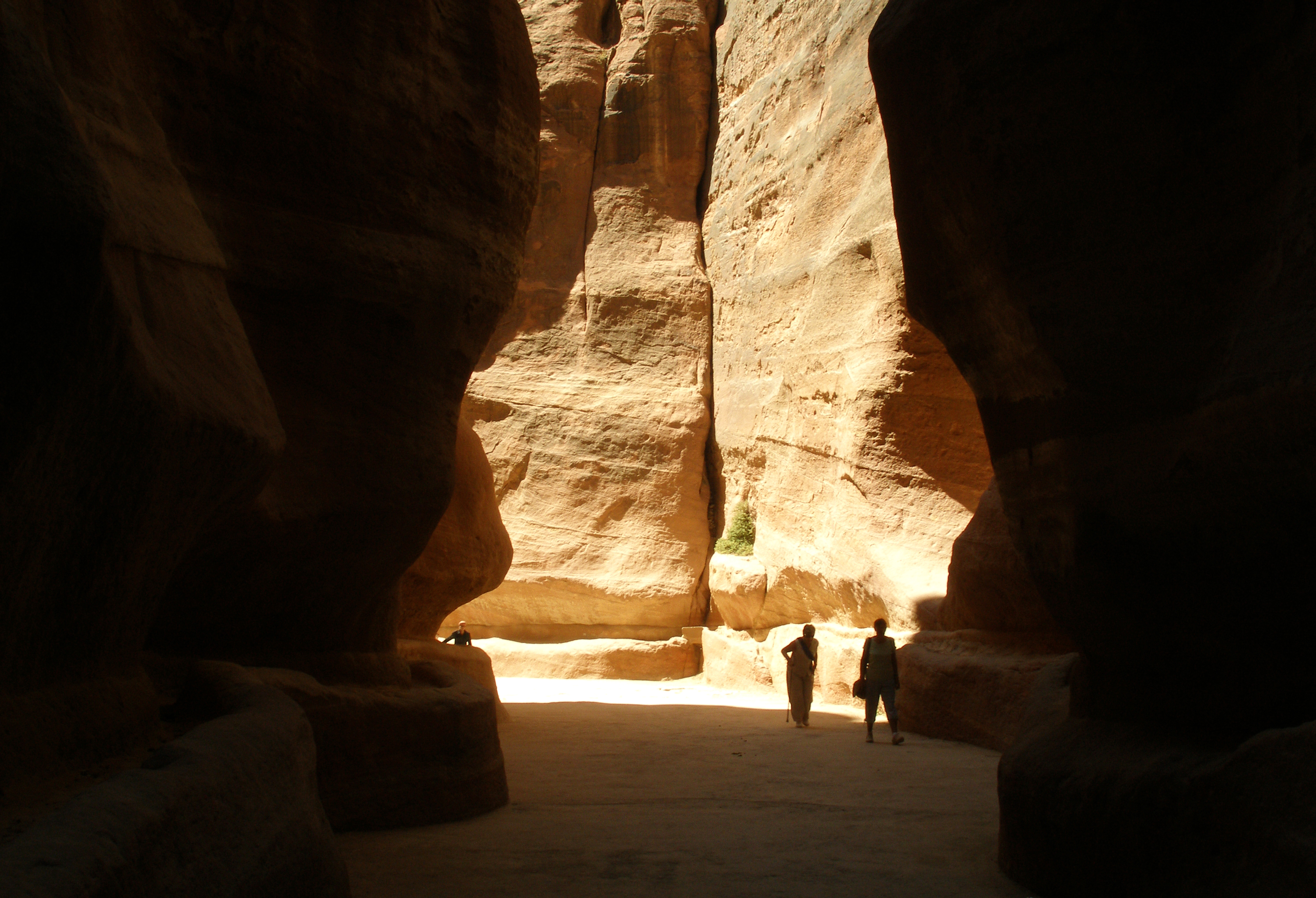
Long and narrow Siq entrance walkway to Petra site.

In 1963, after a working stay in Lebanon, Astruc set out during the first days of Holy Week to visit the ancient ruins of Petra in Jordan with a group of women and girls, most of them pilgrims from the diocese of Paris. Access to the city is through a 1.2-kilometre-long (^{3}/_{4} mi) gorge called the Siq. She died there in the narrow entry passage during a flash flood on 8 April 1963. Twenty-one other women died with her, as did Father Jean Steinmann, the tour guide, and the bus driver who accompanied them; only three women survived. Miriam Astruc was buried in Amman, Jordan.

Some of their records and material on Punic scarabs were evaluated by the British archaeologist John Boardman in 1984 for his publication Escarabeos de piedra procedentes de Ibiza.

== Selected publications ==
- New Excavations in Djidjalli (Algeria). Soc. historical Algerian, Algier 1937 (French).
- The necropolis of Villaricos Ministry of National Education, Madrid 1951 (French).
- Funerary traditions of Carthage. Lavigerie Museum, Carthage 1956 (French).
- Memories of Siret Ferdinand the Catholic Institution, Zaragoza 1956 (Spanish).
- Exoticism and localism: A study of decorated ostrich eggshells from Ibiza. Prehistoric Research Service, Valencia 1957 (French).
