= Saint Matthew (disambiguation) =

Saint Matthew is named in the New Testament as one of the twelve apostles of Jesus.

Saint Matthew may also refer to:

- Saint Matthew the Potter, Egyptian Christian saint of the 8th century
- Saint Matthew Hai-Tsuan (died 1900), of the 222 Martyrs of China
- Saint Matthew (Michelangelo), marble sculpture of Matthew the Apostle by Michelangelo
- Saint Matthew (Ghiberti), bronze statue of Saint Matthew by Lorenzo Ghiberti
- Saint Matthew, Hutt's Gate, church on the island of Saint Helena

== See also ==
- Matthew (disambiguation)
- Saint Matthew Passion (disambiguation)
- Saint Matthew and the Angel (disambiguation)
- San Mateo (disambiguation)
- San Matteo (disambiguation)
