= Saint-Mathieu Lighthouse =

Lighthouse in Finistère, France

Saint-Mathieu lighthouse
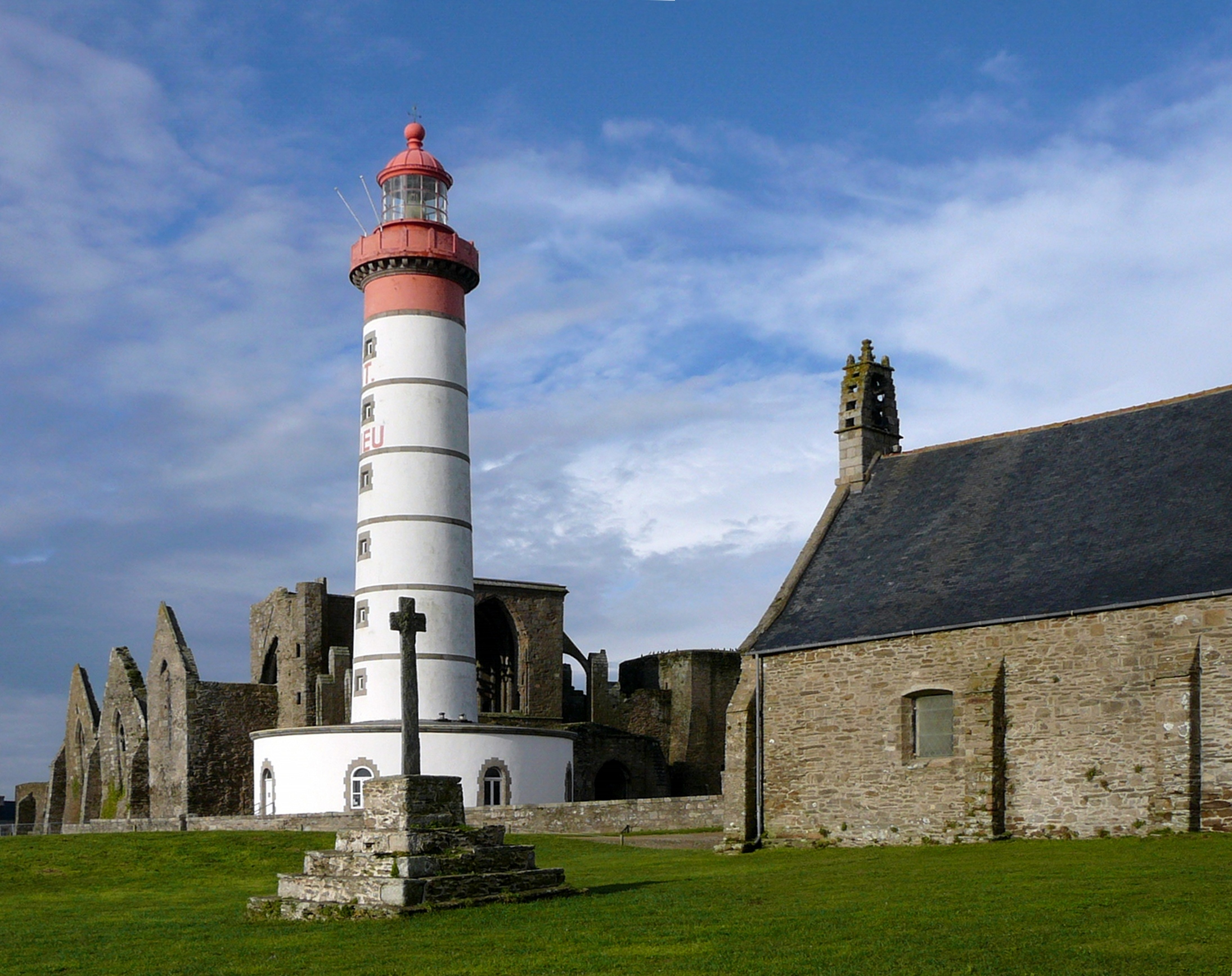
- The Saint-Mathieu Lighthouse and the ruins of the abbey
- Location: Plougonvelin, Finistère, France
- Coordinates: 48°19′48″N 4°46′15″W

Tower
- Constructed: 1692 (first)
- Construction: stone tower
- Automated: 1996
- Height: 121 feet (37 m)
- Shape: cylindrical tower with balcony and lantern
- Markings: white tower with grey trim, red lantern
- Heritage: classified historical monument, monument historique inscrit

Light
- First lit: 1835 (current)
- Focal height: 184 feet (56 m)
- Range: 29 nautical miles (54 km; 33 mi)
- Characteristic: Fl W 15s

The Saint-Mathieu Lighthouse is a lighthouse located on Pointe Saint-Mathieu in Plougonvelin, around Brest in Finistère. The lighthouse is open to the public.

Saint-Mathieu was built in 1835 among the ruins of the ancient Abbaye Saint-Mathieu de Fine-Terre. It is a major lighthouse of the French coast, with a theoretical range of 29 nautical miles (around 55 km).

Along with the Kermorvan Lighthouse, it signals the direction of the Chenal du Four, which transient ships used to follow on a north-south axis before the creation of the Rail d'Ouessant. Saint-Mathieu's alignment with the Portzic Lighthouse also indicates the route for entrance to the Goulet de Brest.

It was classified as a monument historique on 23 May 2011.

== History ==
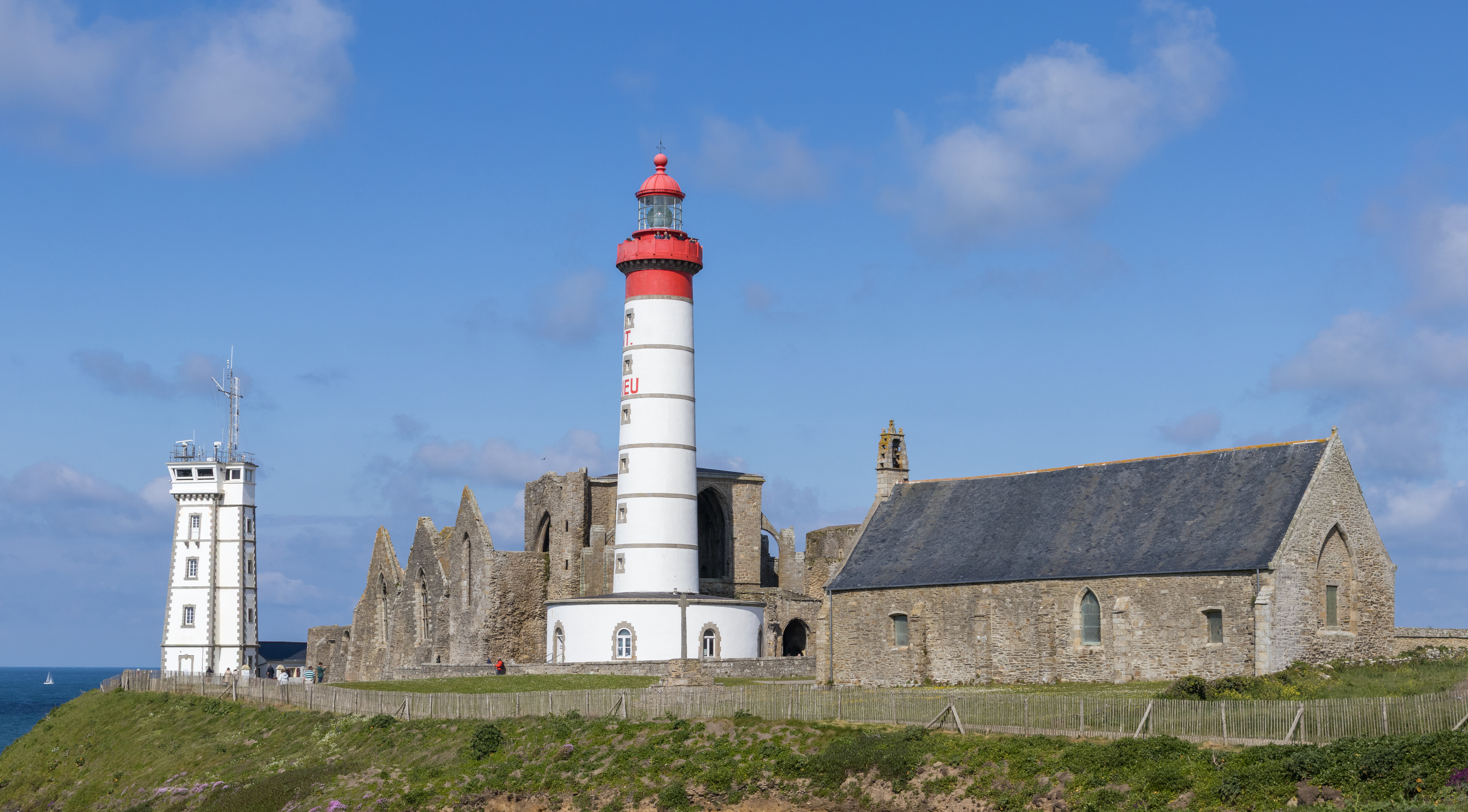
The sémaphore, the ruins of the abbey, and the lighthouse

The promontory of Saint-Mathieu hosts the ruins of an abbey, a sémaphore, and a lighthouse. This bizarre juxtaposition (some suggestions were made to restore the abbey, while deconstructing the lighthouse and rebuilding it elsewhere) is explained by the connections these structures shared throughout Saint-Mathieu's history.

=== First lighthouse ===
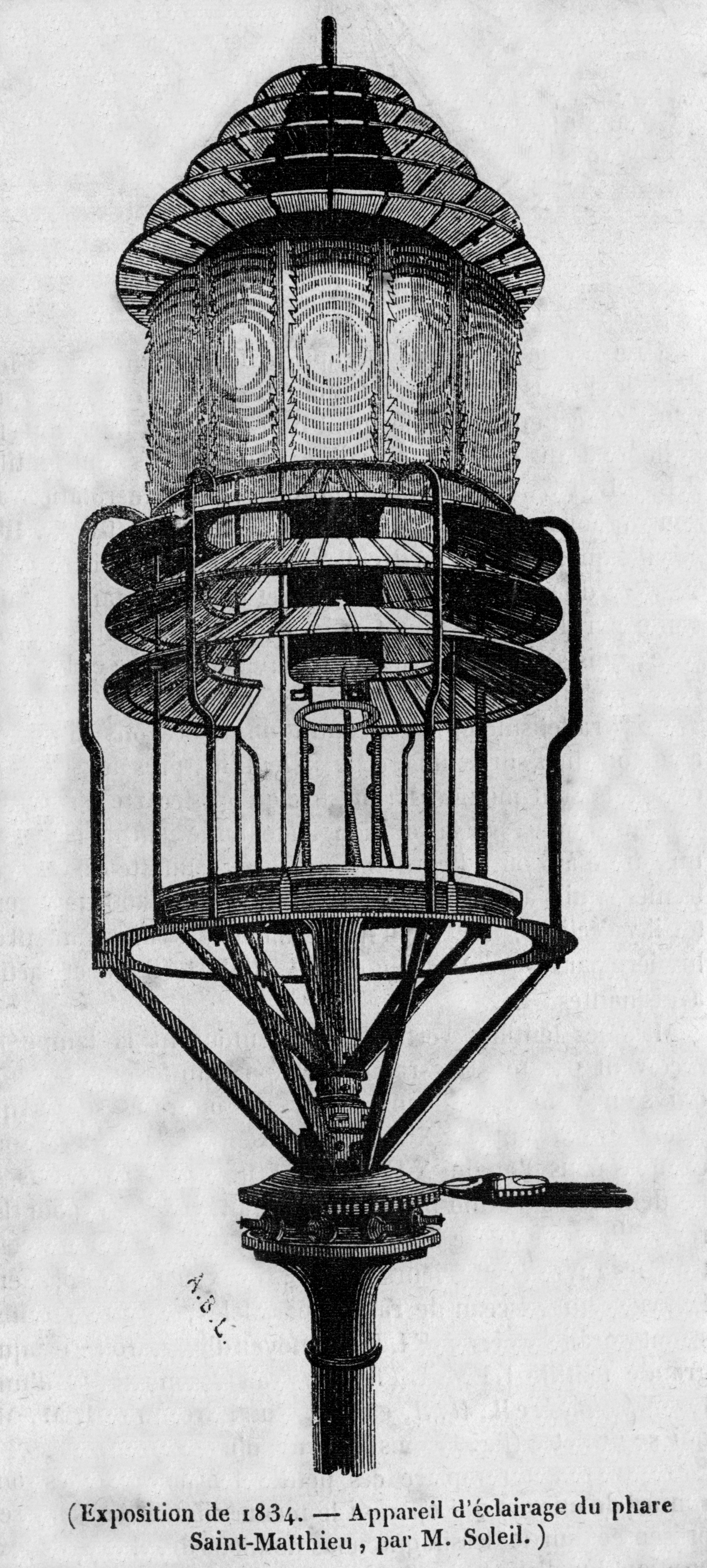
Exposition de 1834 – Light apparatus of the Saint-Mathieu Lighthouse. Gravure from Le Magasin pittoresque, Paris, Vol. 2, p. 285

There had long been a light signal for navigating ships before the Saint-Mathieu Lighthouse. The end of the 17th century, however, brought with it a need for accessibility to a new naval base in Brest and the necessity of more serious methods of navigation for western Brittany.

On 19 November 1691, the construction of a light in the tower of the abbey was proposed, and completed in September 1692. To complete the beacon, another light was inaugurated in 1699 in the Stiff Lighthouse on the island of Ouessant.

However, the cost of ignition was expensive, and the light of Saint-Mathieu was thus only lit on particularly dark nights in the autumn and winter. The use of coal fire additionally presented a risk of setting the abbey ablaze.

In December 1695, the previous light was replaced by a glass lantern, containing five copper lanterns placed on three stacked rows. This brought with it the problem of the light being redirected upward when oil levels fell low, and the problem of clouding the glass with vapors due to the burning of unpurified fish oil.

French naval commander Anne Hilarion de Tourville complained that the lighthouse was not regularly lit. Monks of the abbey offered their services in exchange for a droit de bris (a right to the goods from ships wrecked on one's property), and were charged with illuminating the light from 1 January 1694. The French Navy took charge of the lighthouse in 1701, and rented a house with the purpose of installing a guard.

In March 1750, a gale destroyed the lantern, and a steward of the Navy strengthened the building with a metal frame. At the time, the light could be seen from a distance of two leagues. However, a fence had to be installed to prevent seabirds from crashing into the windowpanes, and this absorbed a great deal of the light.

In 1771, Lieutenant-general Charles Henri Hector made a series of changes. The small windowpanes were replaced by large Bohemian glass, and the lamps were replaced with double wick ones, utilizing a mixture of fish and rapeseed oil. Polished metal reflectors further reinforced the lighthouse's reflection power, and the light of this new lighthouse could be seen up to 18 miles (29 km).

The lighthouse was spared during the sale of national assets. Thus, the ruins and the tower, despite the valuable reserve of stones they could afford, were not to be demolished.

In 1820, the light of Saint-Mathieu was equipped with a device for turning light with eight Lenoir reflectors and Argand lamps, which increased its range. There was still, however, the problem of insufficient height.

=== Current lighthouse ===
The state of the tower of the ancient abbey was deteriorating, and a new lighthouse was put in service on 15 June 1835. The new lighthouse had a drum with an internal diameter of 3.2 metres (10 ft), and an external diameter of 36 metres (118 ft), the base of which was surrounded by a circular building containing various shops and the guards’ quarters. An internal staircase led to sixteen half-lenses placed 55 metres (180 ft) above sea level, which were protected by a glass border of 81 centimetres (32 in), 9 millimetres (0.35 in) thick. In 1860, the characteristic was 30 flashes in 30 seconds, while the range was 22 miles (35 km). The light used canola oil, until being electrified in 1932.

On 10 October 1911, the fire was put in a mercury bath and changed its characteristic, having since been a flashing light every 15 seconds. It assumed its present appearance in June 1963: a white-painted tower marked "SAINT-MATHIEU" in red, with a red stripe at the top.

== Media ==
The Saint-Mathieu Lighthouse served as the backdrop for reports from the 2012–2013 season of the show Thalassa, on France 3.

== Gallery ==
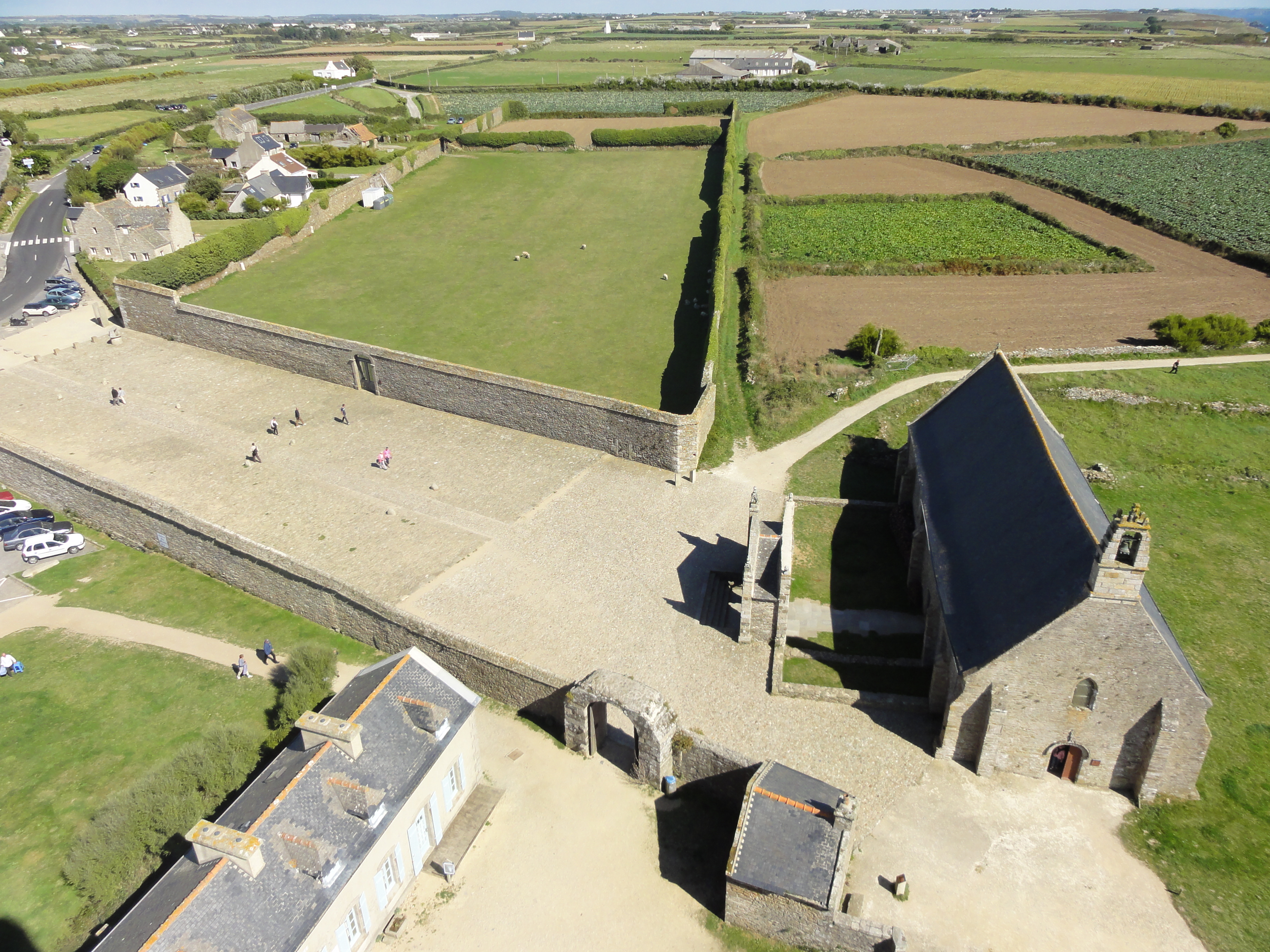
View from the top, towards the east

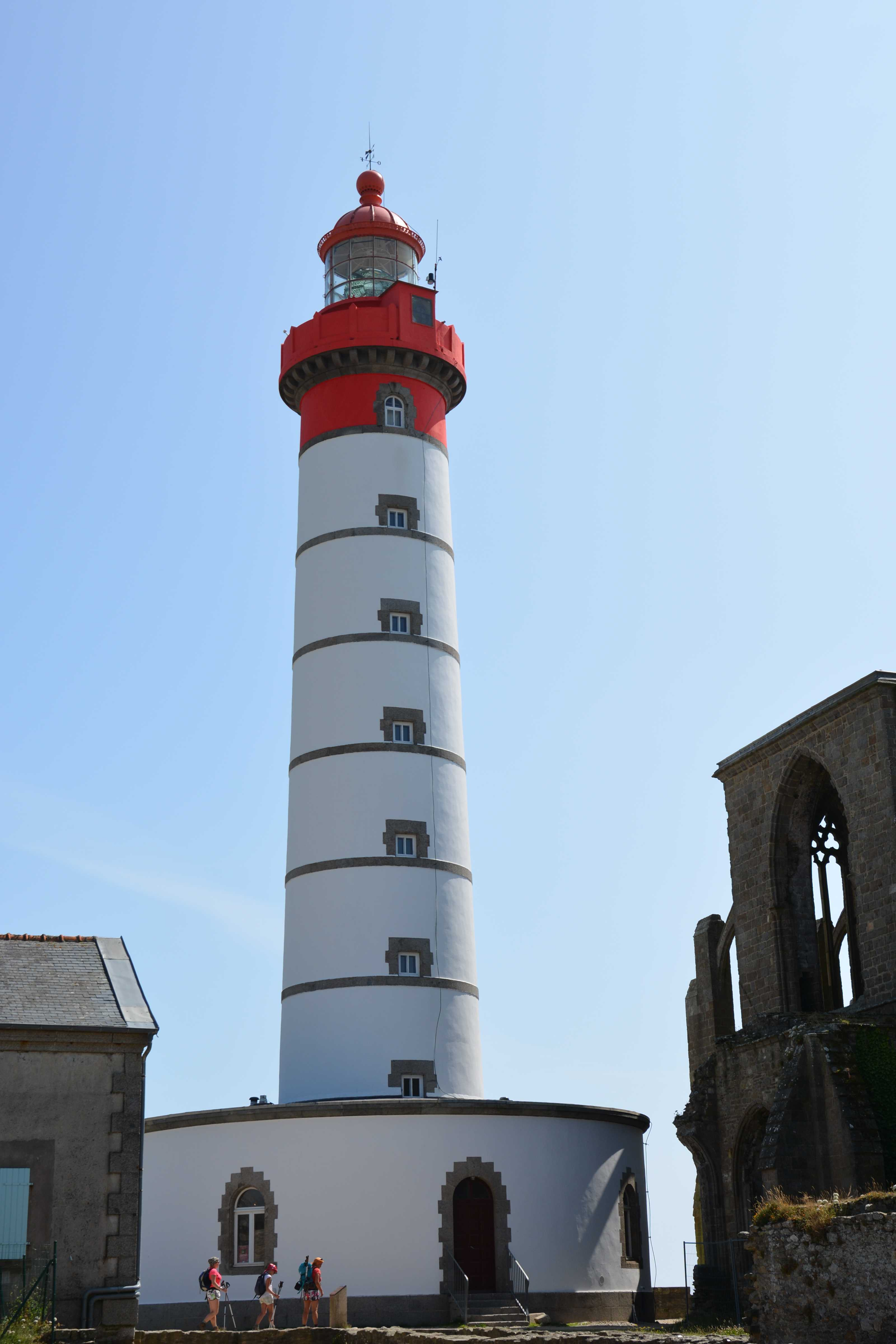
View of the south

== See also ==
- List of lighthouses in France

== Bibliography ==
- Plisson, Philip; Plisson, Guillaume; Charles, Daniel (2002). Phares majeurs de l'arc Atlantique [Major Lighthouses of Atlantic Europe] (in French) (Editions du Chêne ed.). pp. 196–197. ISBN 2-84277-403-5.
