= Pierres Noires Lighthouse =

Pierres Noires lighthouse
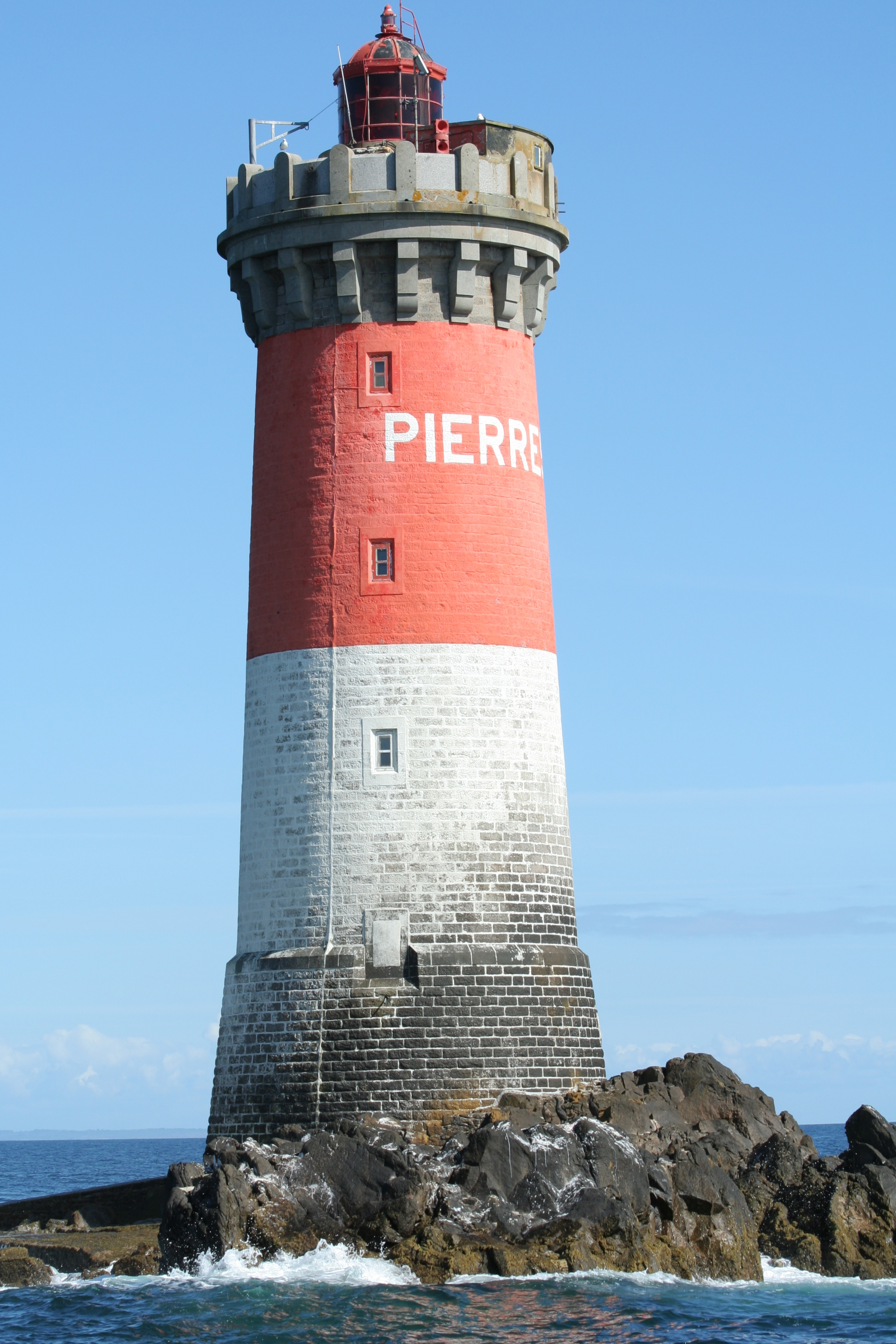
- Location: Le Conquet, France
- Coordinates: 48°18′40″N 4°54′52″W

Tower
- Constructed: 1867
- Construction: stone (tower), granite (foundation)
- Automated: 1992
- Height: 19.4 m (64 ft)
- Shape: conical
- Markings: white and red tower with "PIERRES NOIRES" in white near balustrade; gray balustrade trim, black lantern
- Power source: mineral oil, petroleum
- Heritage: classified historical monument

Light
- First lit: 1872
- Focal height: 28 m (92 ft)
- Intensity: 180 watt
- Range: 20 nmi (37 km; 23 mi)
- Characteristic: Fl R 5s

The Phare des Pierres Noires (English: Black Rocks Lighthouse), is a seacoast lighthouse in the Finistère département of France, designed by the engineer Victor Fénoux and constructed between 1867 and 1871; it was inaugurated on 1 May 1872. Situated mostly on the Pointe Saint-Mathieu, it allows ships to pass through the Chenal du Four ("Channel of the Oven") and avoid at night and during stormy weather the hazards of the Chaussée des Pierres Noires ("Black Rocks Pass"). It is part of the commune of Le Conquet and is owned by the French state.

It was listed as an official French Monument historique by a decree of 31 December 2015. Under advisement from the Commission nationale des monuments historiques, on 20 April 2017 the French Ministry of Culture and Communication listed it under the title "Le Phare des Pierres Noires."

== Construction and architecture ==
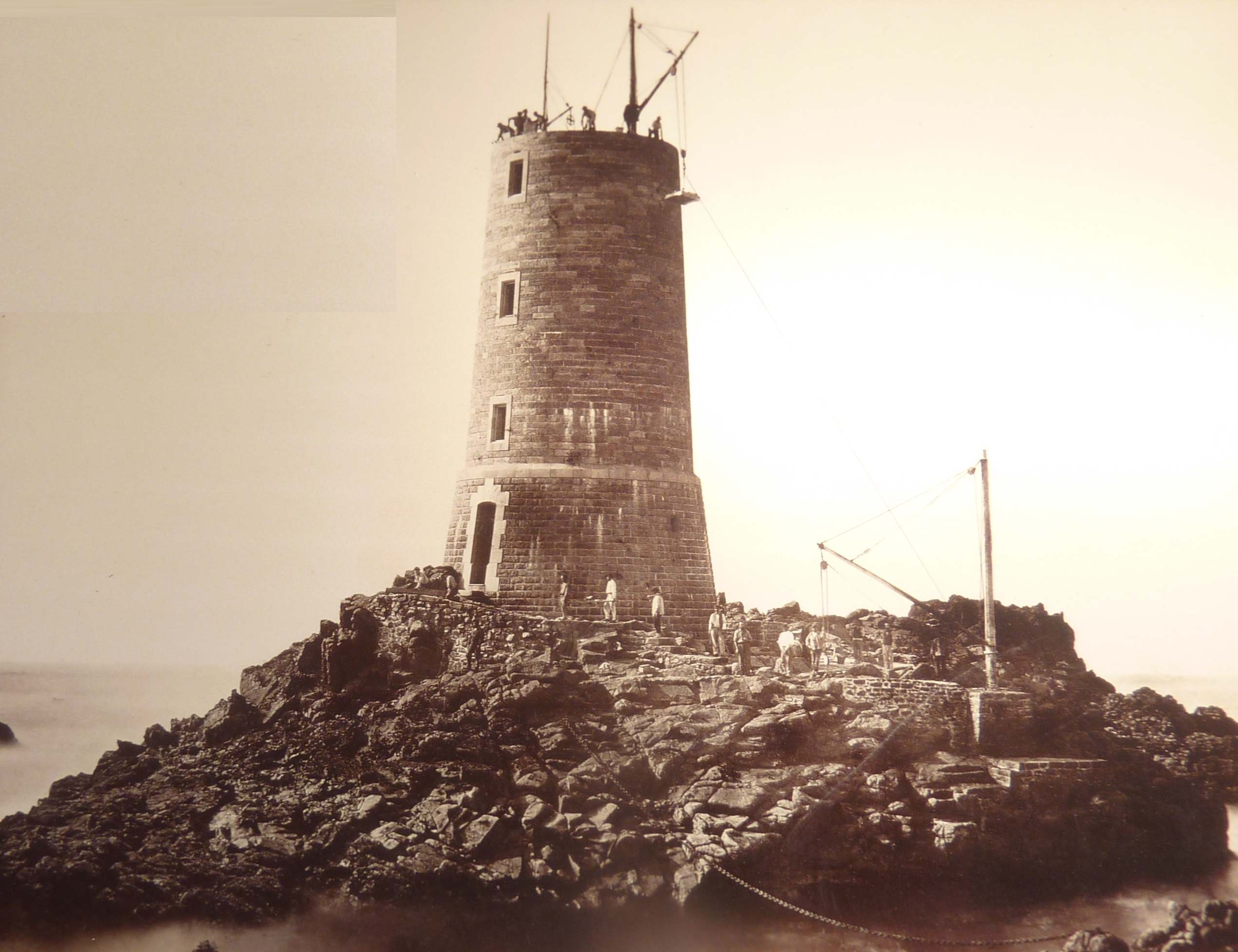
The construction of the Pierres Noires Lighthouse (1865).

The construction project of the Phare des Pierres Noires was approved on 2 July 1862 and the official green light for construction from the Ministry was signed on 3 May 1865. The project was estimated at the time to cost 325,000 gold francs. The corvette Gorgone was wrecked on the Pierres Noires Reef near the Pointe Saint-Mathieu on 18 December 1869; 93 crew members drowned.

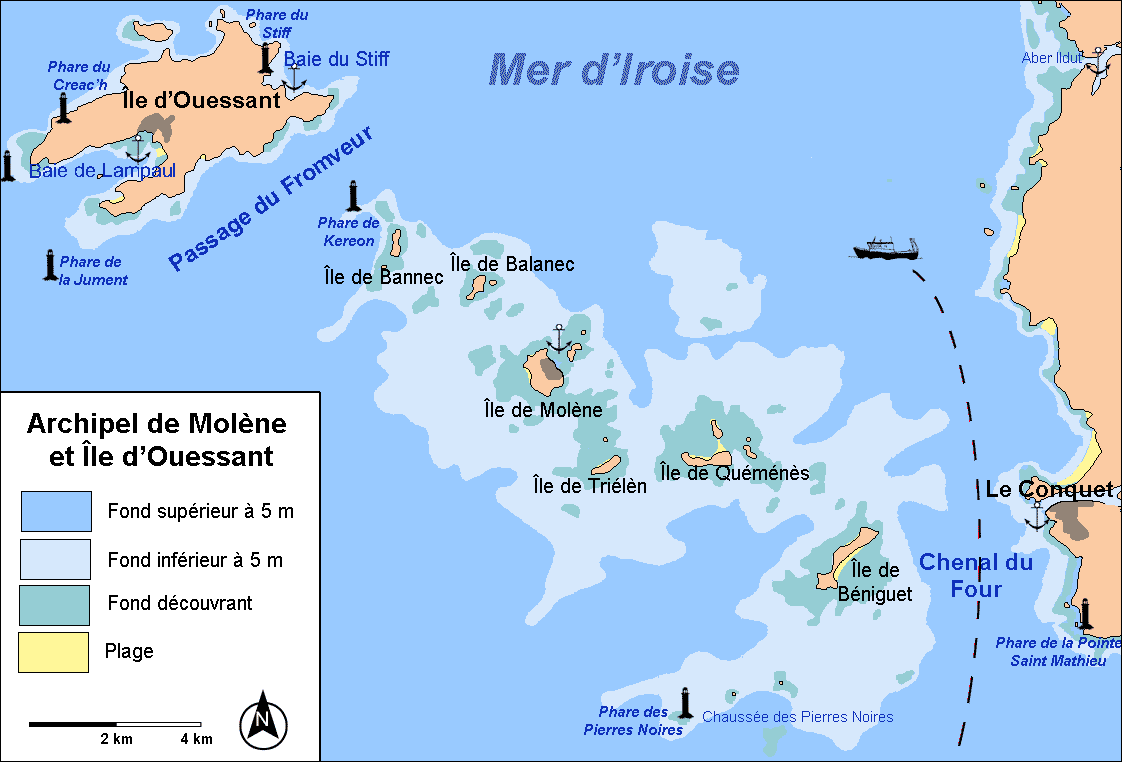
The Phare des Pierre Noires allows ships to pass through the Chenal du Four and avoid the hazards of the Chaussée des Pierres Noires.

The form of the tower of the lighthouse is relatively innovative for the time: it is slightly tapered, which makes its base less flared in profile. The tower was constructed with exposed stone, and the foundations were coarse-grained. The lighthouse is constructed of two types of natural rock from different quarries: (1) granite of the Aber-Ildut and (2) Kersantite granite Finally, the cornice was made of a flat molding which forms the base of the balustrade above.

== Equipment history ==
The first system of lighting from 1872 consisted of a red flashing light every 10 seconds using a 3rd-order Fresnel lens with a focal length of 50 cm.

Different methods of power were successively used for the light:

- 1872: mineral oil
- 1903: steam oil ("huile vapeur")
- 1984: electricity, a 250-watt halogen lamp
- 2018: LED of 36 watts

Today, the light is visible from 360° and emits a red flash every 5 seconds. Situated 28 meters above the sea, it is visible up to a distance of 20 nautical miles. A foghorn (two blasts every 60 seconds) is activated during foggy weather. The light has been automated since 1992 and is controlled remotely by the Phare du Créac'h in Ouessant.

== Lantern renovation of 2017–18 ==
In 2017, the historic original lantern was found to be seriously degraded by the elements and the extreme meteorological conditions of the site, and was in danger of collapse. This risk needs to be below 0.03% given the hazardous risks that the area poses to seafaring ships. The French Service des Phares et Balises (Lighthouse and Beacons Service) at Brest, sent out a call for bids for the study and fabrication of a new lantern which would have at least the same longevity as the old one. The Métallerie Crézé, metalworkers and hardware manufacturers based in Saint-Jacques-de-la-Lande, in the Ille-et-Vilaine département since 1898, was given the contract for the renovation. Crézé had been appointed in 2016 as an "Entreprise du patrimoine vivant," a title given to companies whose work is approved for government-sponsored restoration. The old lantern was removed via helicopter and transported to the company's workshops, modeled using 3-D digital modeling techniques. Certain elements, such as the peripteral architectural frieze and bronze-sculpted lion heads, were restored, to be reintegrated into the new structure. The new lantern was finished by the end of 2017.

A new light equipped with a power of 36 watts and using LEDs replaced the old light, which had used a 250-watt halogen bulb, whose rotation was powered by a pool of Mercury, installed in 1903 and removed in 2018. The renovation also included the replacement of the original Fresnel lens, beginning in May 2017. The new lantern was installed in July 2018 and the renovation works, whose cost totaled some 400,000 euros, was officially paid off at the end of September that year.

== Bibliography ==
- Louis Chauris, "Construction d'un phare en mer d'Iroise: les Pierres Noires (1866-1872)," in Annales de Bretagne et des pays de l'Ouest 105, no. 1 (1998): 71–89.

== See also ==
- List of lighthouses in France
- Media related to Pierres Noires lighthouse at Wikimedia Commons
