= San Matteo =

San Matteo (Italian for 'Saint Matthew') may refer to:

== Churches in Italy ==
- San Matteo (Genoa), Roman Catholic church in Genoa, Liguria
- San Matteo, Tortona, Baroque-style Roman Catholic church in Tortona, Piedmont
- San Matteo al Cassaro, Baroque-style Roman Catholic church in Palermo, Sicily
- San Matteo con Cortile, former Roman Catholic church in Verona, Veneto
- San Matteo in Merulana, church in Rome, Lazio

== See also ==
- Matteo
- San Mateo (disambiguation)
- Saint Matthew (disambiguation)
