= Sant Mateu (disambiguation) =

Sant Mateu (Catalan for Saint Matthew) may refer to:

- Sant Mateu, a town and municipality in Castellón, Valencia
- Sant Mateu de Bages, a village in the comarca of Bages
- Sant Mateu d’Albarca, a small village in the North of the Spanish island of Ibiza

== See also ==
- San Mateo (disambiguation)
- São Mateus (disambiguation)
- Saint-Mathieu (disambiguation)
