= São Mateus =

São Mateus is Portuguese for Saint Matthew, and may refer to one of the following places:

== Brazil ==
- São Mateus, Espírito Santo, a municipality and a city in the state of Espírito Santo
- São Mateus, Juiz de Fora, Minas Gerais, a barrio in the city of Juiz de Fora, Minas Gerais
- São Mateus, São João de Meriti, Rio de Janeiro, a barrio in the city of São João de Meriti, Rio de Janeiro
- Subprefecture of São Mateus, São Paulo
- São Mateus (district of São Paulo)
- São Mateus do Maranhão, a municipality in the state of Maranhão
- São Mateus do Sul, a municipality in the state of Paraná
- Roman Catholic Diocese of São Mateus, based in São Mateus, Espírito Santo

== Portugal ==
- São Mateus (Madalena), a civil parish in the municipality of Madalena, Pico, Azores
- São Mateus da Calheta, a civil parish in the municipality of Angra do Heroísmo, Terceira, Azores
- São Mateus, the alternative name for the civil parish of Urzelina, in the municipality of Velas, São Jorge, Azores

== See also ==
- San Mateo (disambiguation)
- Sant Mateu (disambiguation)
- Saint-Mathieu (disambiguation)
