= 2022 Jordan floods =

Weather event in Jordan

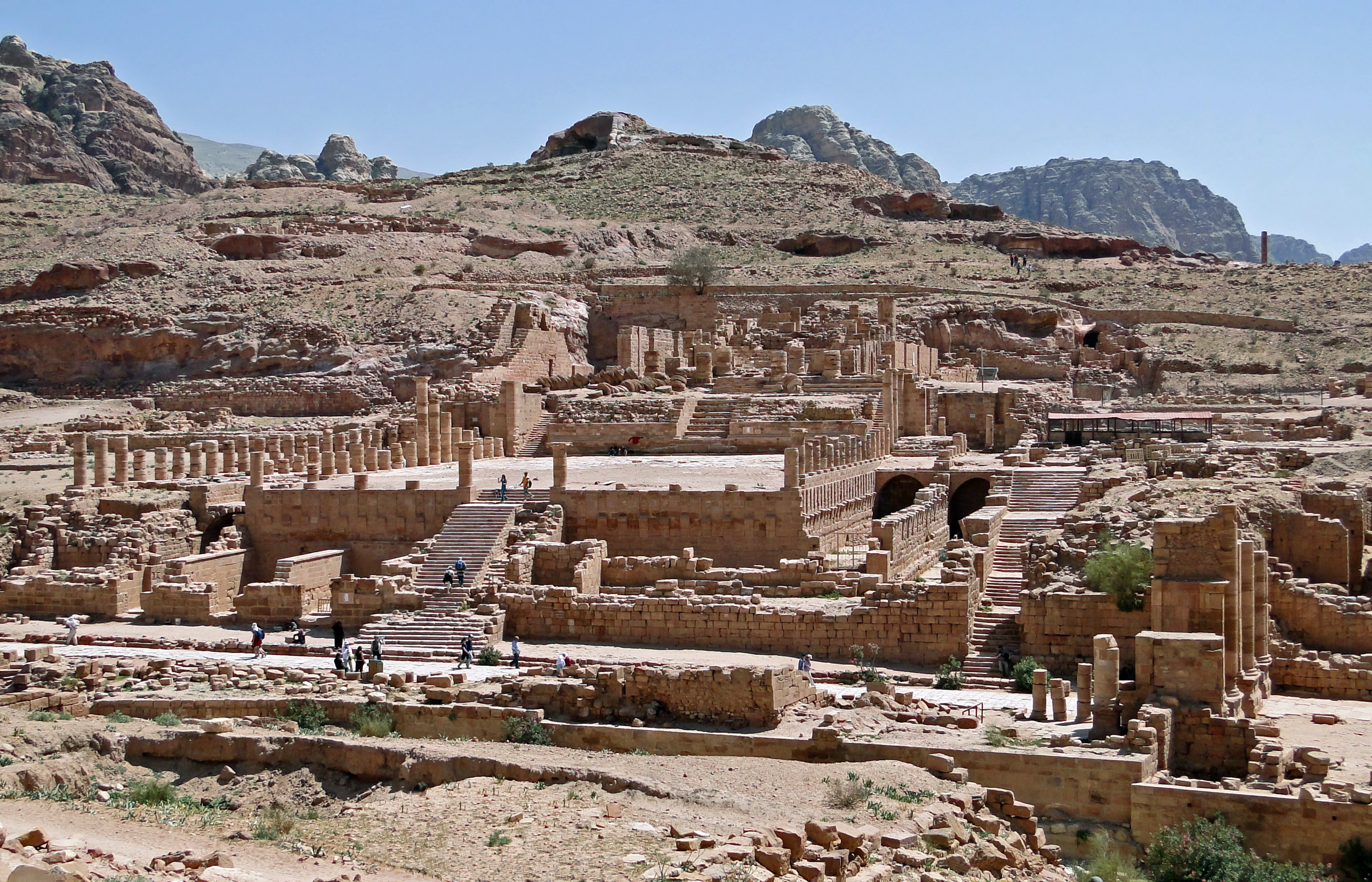
- Ancient Petra
- Date: 27 December 2022
- Location: Petra, Jordan
- Cause: Rainstorm
- Deaths: Unknown
- Property damage: Unknown

On 27 December 2022, flash floods hit the ancient city of Petra in Jordan. 1,700 tourists were evacuated from the historic site. This was reportedly a result of historic rainfall that hit the area.

== Previous floods ==
In 2018, 20 people were killed by floods.

In 1963, 23 French tourists, including archeologist Miriam Astruc, were swept away by floodwaters in the narrow Siq entrance to the city.
