= Saint Tanguy =

Breton saint

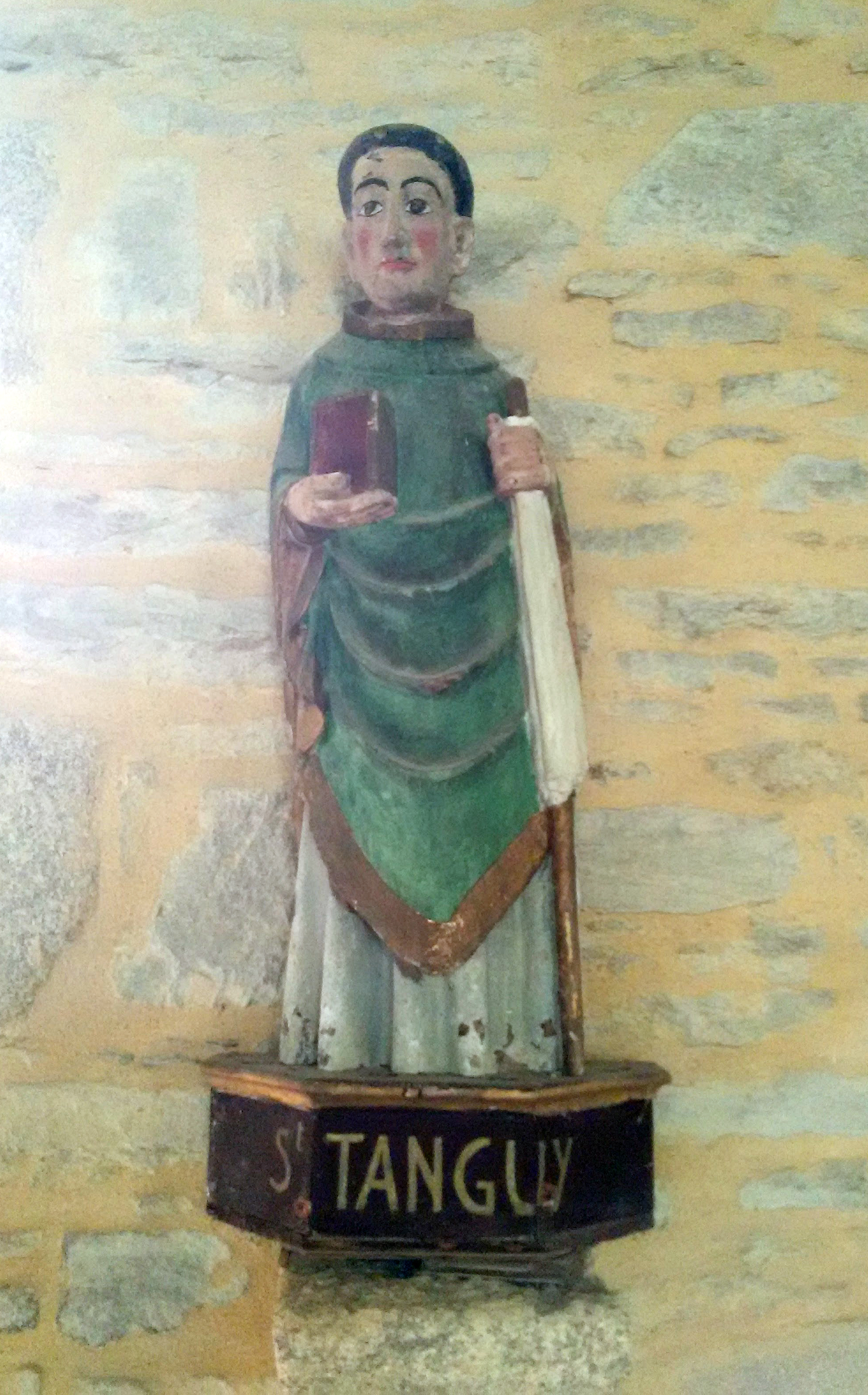
- Saint Tanguy
- Feast: 19 November

Saint Tanguy of Locmazhé, or Sant Tangi in Breton, († 594) was a Breton monk from Gerber (Le Relecq). He founded the abbaye de Saint Matthieu at Le Conquet and is buried at Locmazhé (Finistère). Saint Tanguy is celebrated on 19 November, the day after the festival of his sister Aude de Trémazan, or on 12 March, the same day as the festival of his spiritual father, Saint Pol Aurélien.
