= Ibiza and Formentera's Archaeological Museum =

Archaeological museum in Ibiza, Spain

Coordinates: 38°54′25″N 1°26′12″E

The Museo Arqueológico de Ibiza y Formentera is an archaeological museum that preserves, researches and exhibits the remains belonging to the historical past of the islands of Ibiza and Formentera. The museum is housed on two campuses; the Archaeological museum of Dalt Vila and the Monographic museum of Puig Des Molins, both located within the Ibiza old town.

The Ibiza and Formentera's Archaeological Museum has a museographic content which spans three thousand years of Pytiusic islands history, from the first people who settled in the islands to the Catalan conquest in 1235.

The archaeological museum is situated in the fortified city of Dalt Vila and was in 1907, thanks to the donation to the state of the collection belonging to the Archaeological Society of Ibiza. This society, which had been founded in 1903, had carried out several excavations in Ibiza and Formentera. All the material recovered in these campaigns were part of the first permanent exhibition in the Archaeological Museum, which grew after the material from Ses Torres, Portmany and the sanctuaries of Illa Plana and Es Culleram were donated by a local family, in 1913. Puig des Molins' Monographic Museum is located inside the archaeological site of Puig des Molins Necropolis. It features both the history of the site as well as the most important archaeological materials recovered from the necropolis, duly explained and in context.

The site of Puig des Molins was selected in the 7th century BC as a burial ground by the Phoenicians, the founders of the city of Ibiza. During Antiquity, this was the site where the urban necropolis was located. Since 1903, several archaeological works have been carried out, which have provided a large amount of Phoenician, Punic and Roman materials and artifacts. In 1931, the necropolis was declared by the Spanish state a Historical and Artistic Monument, and it is today, the largest and most well-preserved Phoenician-Punic necropolis in the western Mediterranean.

In 1999, it was declared a UNESCO World Heritage site.
