= Manadas =

- Civil parish
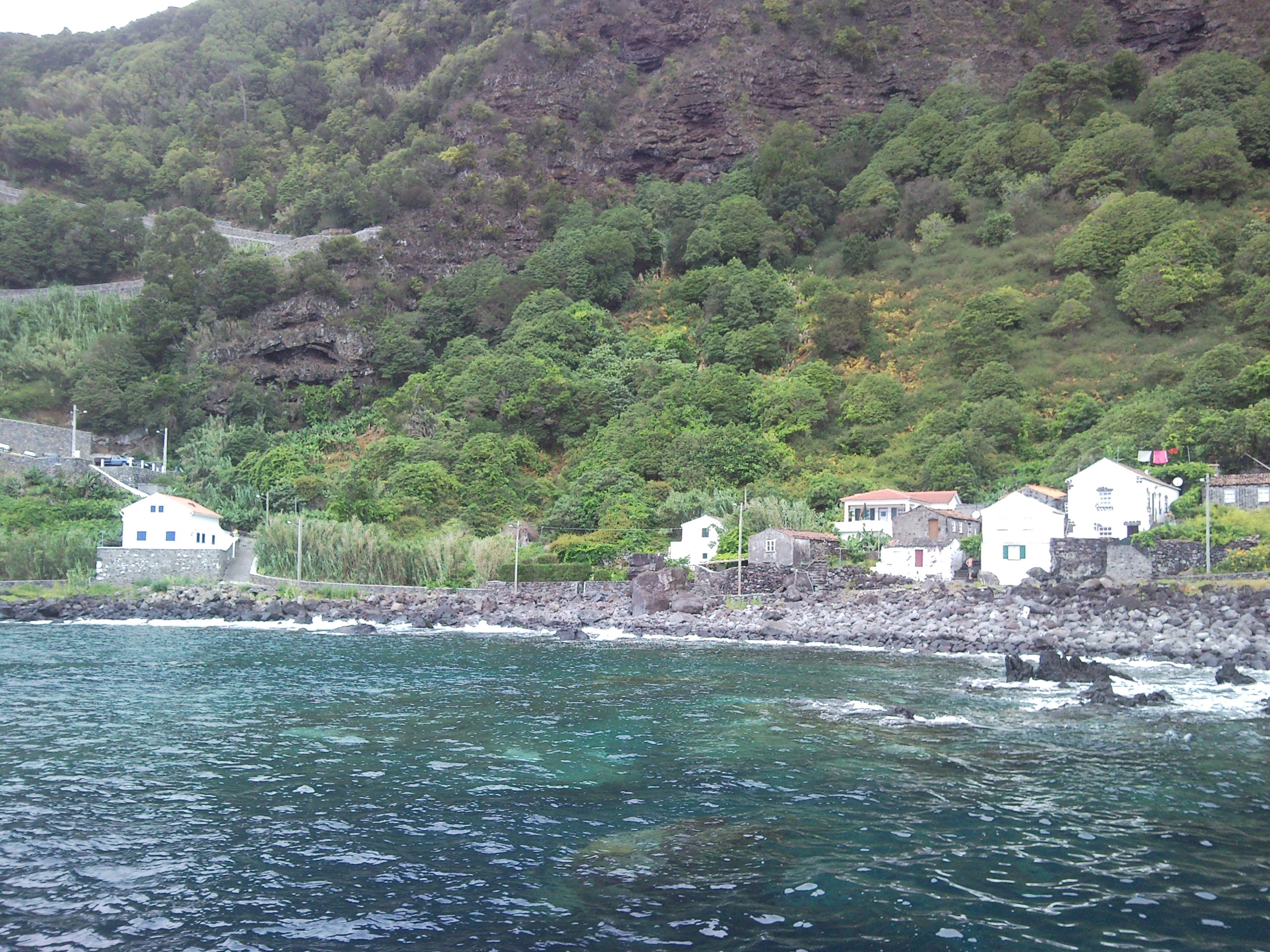
- A coastal perspective of the Fajã das Almas in the parish of Manadas

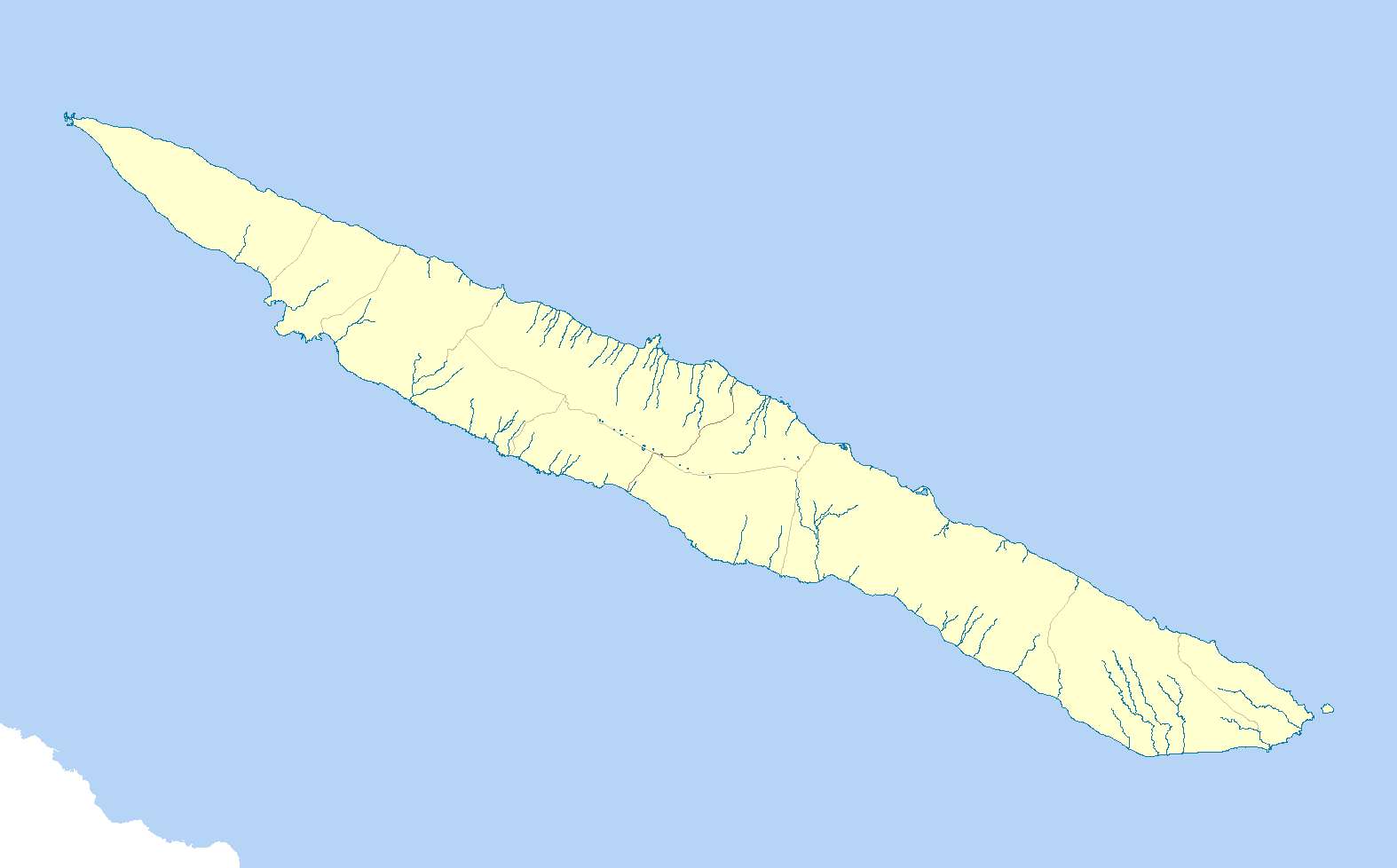
- Location in the Azores Manadas (São Jorge)
- Coordinates: 38°38′5″N 28°5′46″W
- Country: Portugal
- Auton. region: Azores
- Island: São Jorge
- Municipality: Velas
- Established: Settlement: c. 1559

Area
  - Total: 11.20 km^{2} (4.32 sq mi)
- Elevation: 114 m (374 ft)

Population (2011)
  - Total: 374
  - Density: 33.4/km^{2} (86.5/sq mi)
- Time zone: UTC−01:00 (AZOT)
  - Summer (DST): UTC+00:00 (AZOST)
- Postal code: 9850-026
- Area code: 292
- Patron: Santa Bárbara

Manadas, once locally known as Santa Bárbara, is a civil parish in the municipality of Velas in the Azores. The population in 2011 was 374, in an area of 11.20 km^{2}.

== History ==
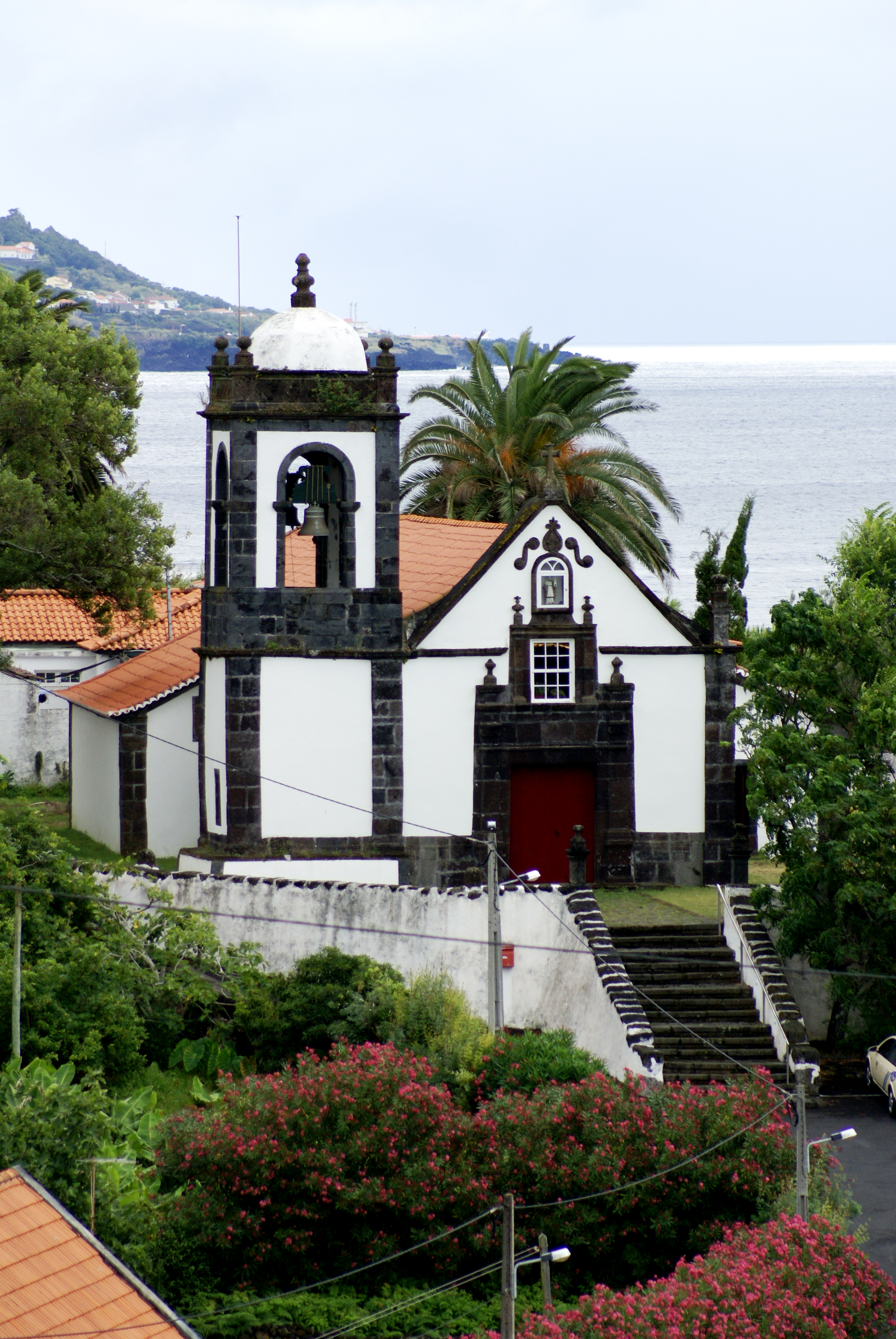
The parochial Church of Santa Bárbara, located on the southern coast.

Santa Bárbara was one of the older parishes on São Jorge, probably founded before 1550, when 250 inhabitants lived in the parish and when it began appearing in documents during the 16th century. In 1568, it was included in a listing of six religious parishes that occupied the island of São Jorge. At the time of its founding, it included an area vastly larger than its current borders with the communities of Urzelina, Terreiros and Fajã das Almas lying within its borders.

At the beginning of 18th century the population had grown to 500 residents.

The Port of Manadas was marked by a lookout's hut, constructed in 1647, to monitor shipping the São Jorge Channel. During the era of piracy, the locals would hang supposed pirates from this vantage point, as a warning to pirates or privateers of the consequences of attacking the village/municipality. Years later, the area of Manadas was the location of the Fort of Urzelina, which was used to protect the area. During the Orange Cycle (the economic period where local farmers produced citrus fruits for export) the lookout was used to warn of the arrival of cargo ships, and alerting them to have their produce in port for shipment. Later, the port was also the staging port for exports of Castelete wines to the European continent and England.

Manadas was the birthplace of the ethnographer João Teixeira Soares de Sousa, who greatly contributed to the histo-cultural development of the island.

The parochial Church of Santa Bárbara was constructed over an older temple that dated to the 15th century. The remodelled architecture, which dates back to the 18th century, includes rare golden ornamentation and is one example of the Baroque-style, popular in the Azores. Classified a national monument, it remains unaltered since its construction; includes original azulejo (dedicated to local quarrymen), its golden altars, an original roof (built with cedros) and original sacristy. In addition, the parish is populated with several other historical religious sanctuaries: Chapel of Santa Rita de Cássia, Chapel of Senhora da Guadalupe and Chapel of Santo Cristo.

== Geography ==
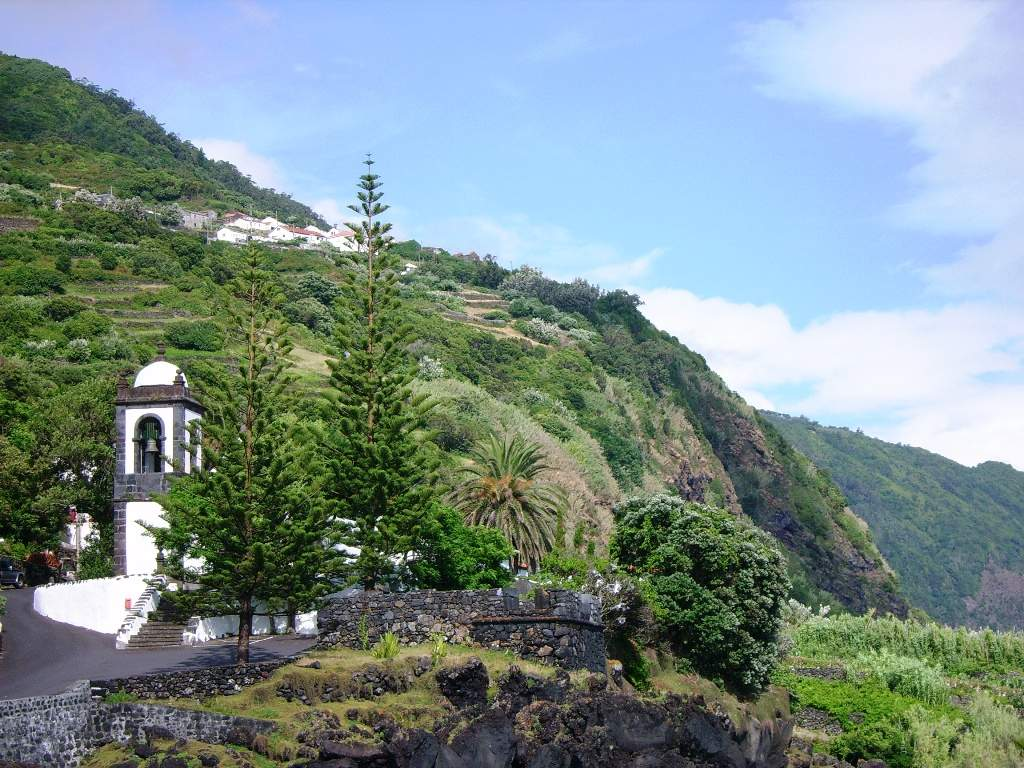
Partial vista of the parish of Manadas showing the cliffs and settlement of Ladeiras from the coast near the Church of Santa Bárbara

Located 15 kilometres from the municipal seat of Velas, on the municipalities southern border with (Calheta); it is delimited by the São Jorge Channel (on the southern coast), the civil parish of Urzelina (along the Ribeira Large) and the ridge of Pico da Esperança (in the civil parish of Norte Grande. The parish contains the localities Fajã das Almas, Ladeiras, Manadas and Ponta das Casteletes.

The parish is populated by older cottages, orchards and fields in scattered settlements dispersed by mountainous cliffs, and highlighted by small coastal plains. The largest of these fajãs, location of the parochial church and village port, is the largest settlement (Fajã das Almas), located in the middle of the southern coast. Its semi-planar surface is in contrast with the cliffs to the east which front the São Jorge Channel, and has produced a micro-climate that has sustained many orchards and fields that produce coffee, wine, tropical fruits and species of Dragon trees (Dracaena draco) typical of the Canary Islands, Cape Verde and Madeira.

Along the foothills, there are several springs and fountains that sustained early settlements, while the ports, including the Port of Terreiros was originally center for the fishing industry, but now used for sport and summer fishermen.

== Economy ==
The principal industry in this parish is dairy production, being the location of a branch of the island's Cooperative dos Lacticínios.
