= San Mateo =

San Mateo, Spanish for Saint Matthew, is the name for many places:

== Bolivia ==
- San Matéo River
- San Matéo River (Ichilo River)

== Canary Islands ==
- Vega de San Mateo, a municipality on the island of Gran Canaria, Las Palmas province

== Colombia ==
- San Mateo, Boyacá
- San Mateo (TransMilenio), a bus station in Bogotá

== Costa Rica ==
- San Mateo (canton), a canton in the province of Alajuela
- San Mateo de Alajuela, a city and district in the canton

== Guatemala ==
- San Mateo, Quetzaltenango
- San Mateo Ixtatán, in Huehuetenango

== Mexico ==
=== State of Mexico ===
- San Mateo Atenco
- San Mateo Mexicaltzingo

=== Oaxaca ===
- San Mateo Cajonos
- San Mateo del Mar
- San Mateo Etlatongo
- San Mateo Nejapam
- San Mateo Peñasco
- San Mateo Piñas
- San Mateo Río Hondo
- San Mateo Sindihui
- San Mateo Tlapiltepec
- San Mateo Yoloxochitlán

=== Puebla ===
- San Mateo Ozolco

== Peru ==
- San Mateo de Otao District
- San Mateo District, Huarochirí

== Philippines ==
- San Mateo, Isabela
- San Mateo, Rizal
- San Mateo, San Pablo

== Spain ==
- San Mateo (Cantabria), a village of the municipality of the Los Corrales de Buelna, Cantabria

== United States ==
- San Mateo County, California
- San Mateo, California
- San Mateo, Florida
- San Mateo, New Mexico
- San Mateo (Santurce), Puerto Rico

== Venezuela ==
- San Mateo, Anzoátegui
- San Mateo, Aragua

== Other uses ==
- San Mateo (water), a brand of bottled water sold in Peru

== See also ==
- San Matteo (disambiguation)
- Sant Mateu (disambiguation)
- São Mateus (disambiguation)
- Saint-Mathieu (disambiguation)
