= Urzelina =

- Civil parish
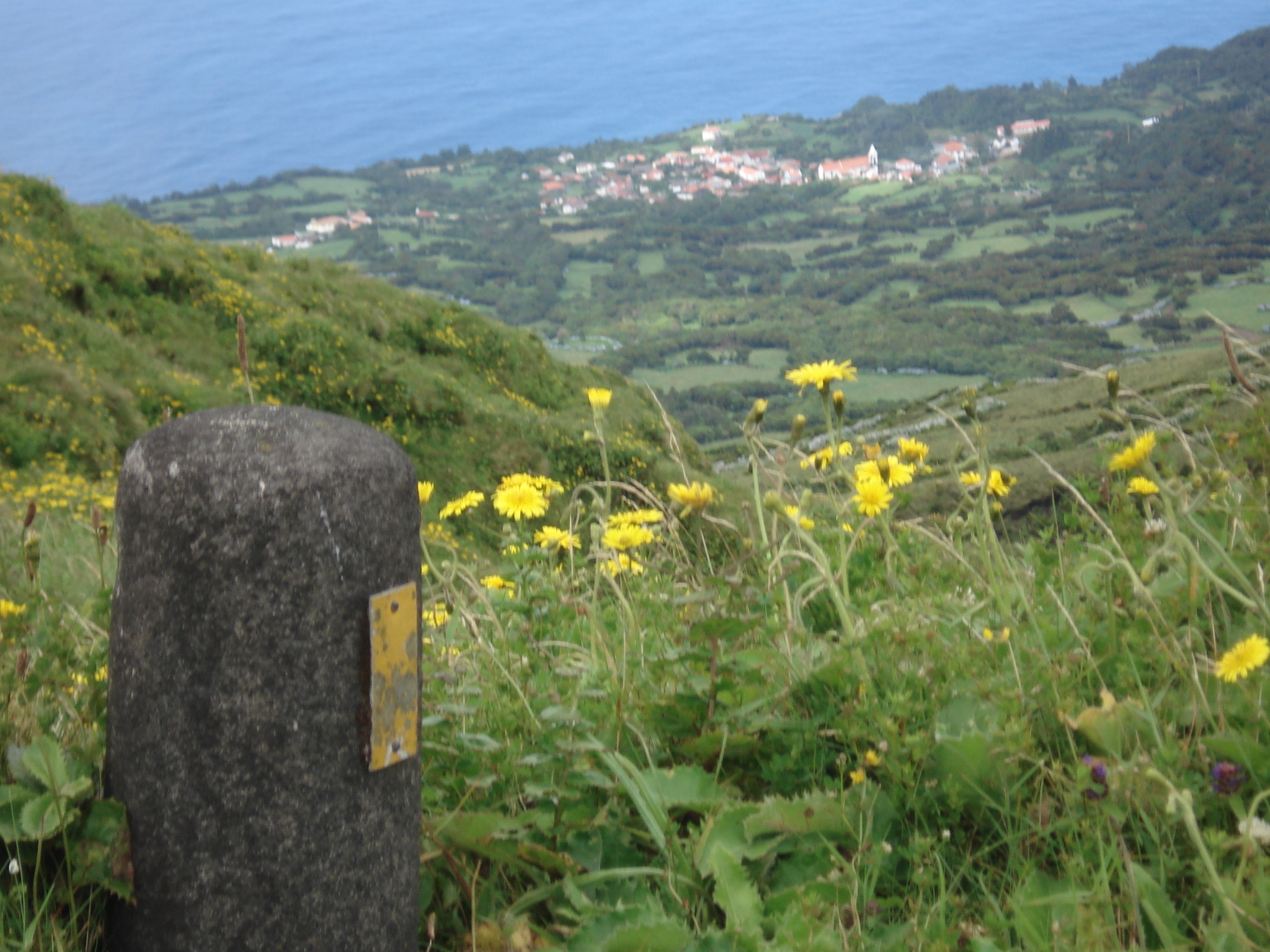
- Village of Urzelina, as seen from the highest point in the civil parish (Pico Verde)

- Location of the civil parish of Urzelina within the municipality of Velas
- Coordinates: 38°39′5″N 28°8′11″W
- Country: Portugal
- Auton. region: Azores
- Island: São Jorge
- Municipality: Velas

Area
  - Total: 13.69 km^{2} (5.29 sq mi)
- Elevation: 86 m (282 ft)

Population (2011)
  - Total: 902
  - Density: 65.9/km^{2} (171/sq mi)
- Time zone: UTC−01:00 (AZOT)
  - Summer (DST): UTC+00:00 (AZOST)
- Postal code: 9800-433
- Area code: 292
- Patron: São Mateus

Urzelina is a civil parish in the municipality of Velas in the Portuguese islands of the Azores. The population in 2011 was 902, in an area of 13.69 km². It is situated near the south coast of the island of São Jorge. It is alternately known as São Mateus, to which the parish was named after its patron saint.

== History ==
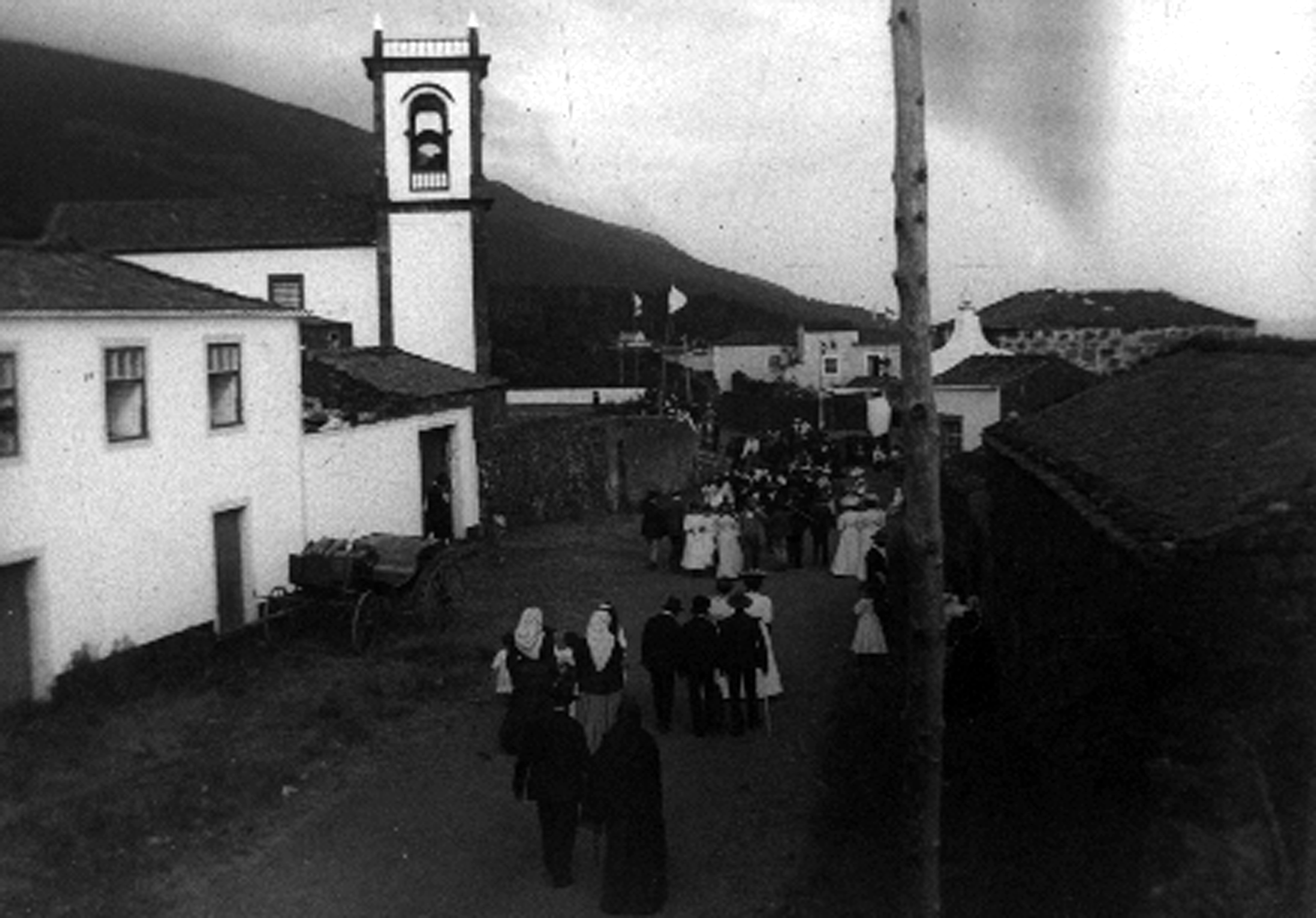
Urzelina as seen in 1910, during the popular festivals of the time

The first settlers reached this coast in the 15th century, but were isolated 15 kilometres (9.3 mi) from Faial. Many of the early homes were built along the coast, on lowlands and flanks of the interior mountain range, interspersed in the forests.

The parish received its name owing to the abundance of urzela (Roccella tinctoria) found by the first explorers and settlers, along its coastal clifftops and which later became a source of an export market, because it was used in dying. Urzela, a species of fungus, was harvested and exported to Flanders and England in the early 15th-16th centuries, thereby supporting the economies of the island, in addition to many of the islands of the Azores.

Urzelina was once a place within the parish of Manadas and elevated to parish around 1647. At the time, a decision was made to construct a port, in order to support and enhance its transitory exchange between the island and continental Portugal. It was important for the epoch, since it was one of the first ports constructed on the island at the time.

The history of Urzelina has been shaped by the events of 1 May 1808, when a volcanic eruption destroyed a great part of the settlement, and caused fear and panic in its populous. It also resulted in the destruction of most of the arable lands, and plunged the island into a period of famine. Lava reached as far as the local parochial church, which was inundated with basaltic flows and brought into ruin. The bell-tower and belfry are the only remnants of the event.

== Geography ==
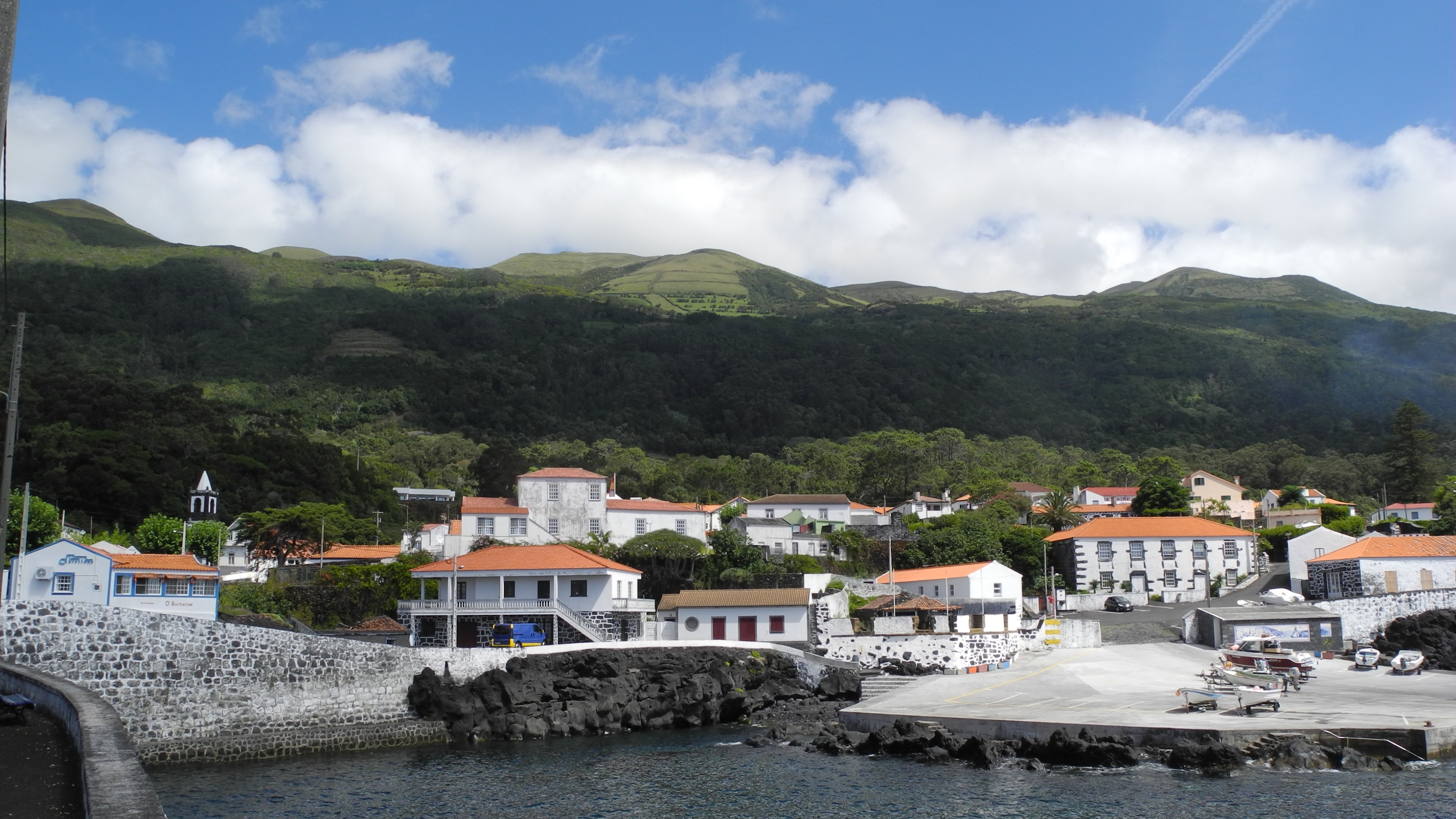
The urban centre of the parish seat of Urzelina including port and fajã

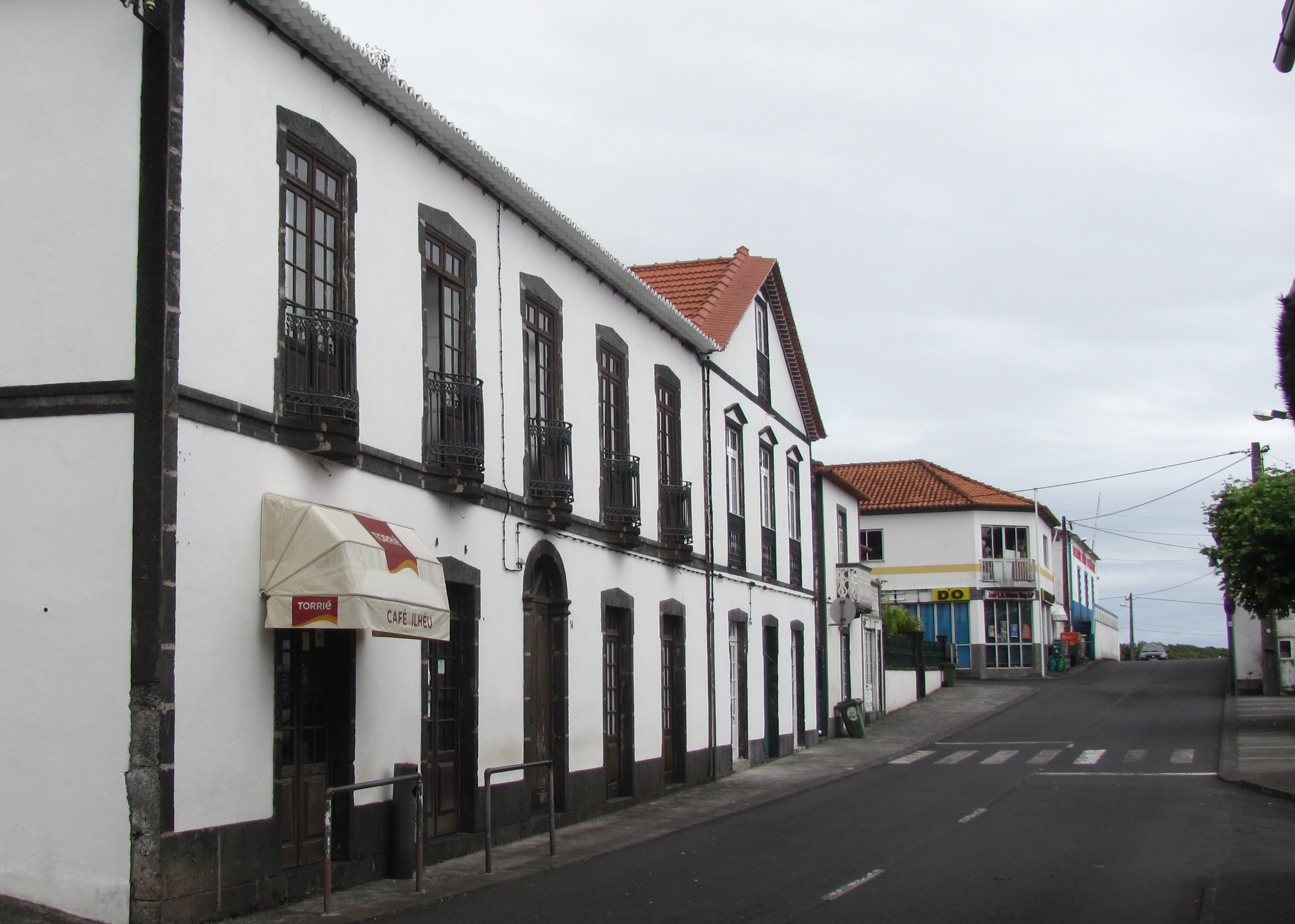
Main street of Urzelina and old regional roadway

Urzelina is located 10 kilometres (6.2 mi) from the town of Velas, and its centre 6 kilometres (3.7 mi) from the islands airport. It contains the localities Canada da Bica, Canada da Feteira, Casteletes, Canada do Cruzeiro, Canada do Leitão, Maratecas, Ponta das Casteletes and Ronqueiro.

== Architecture ==
- Church of São Mateus (Portuguese: Igreja Paroquial de Urzelina/Igreja de São Mateus)
