= San Matteo con Cortile, Verona =

San Matteo con Cortile
- Chiesa di San Matteo
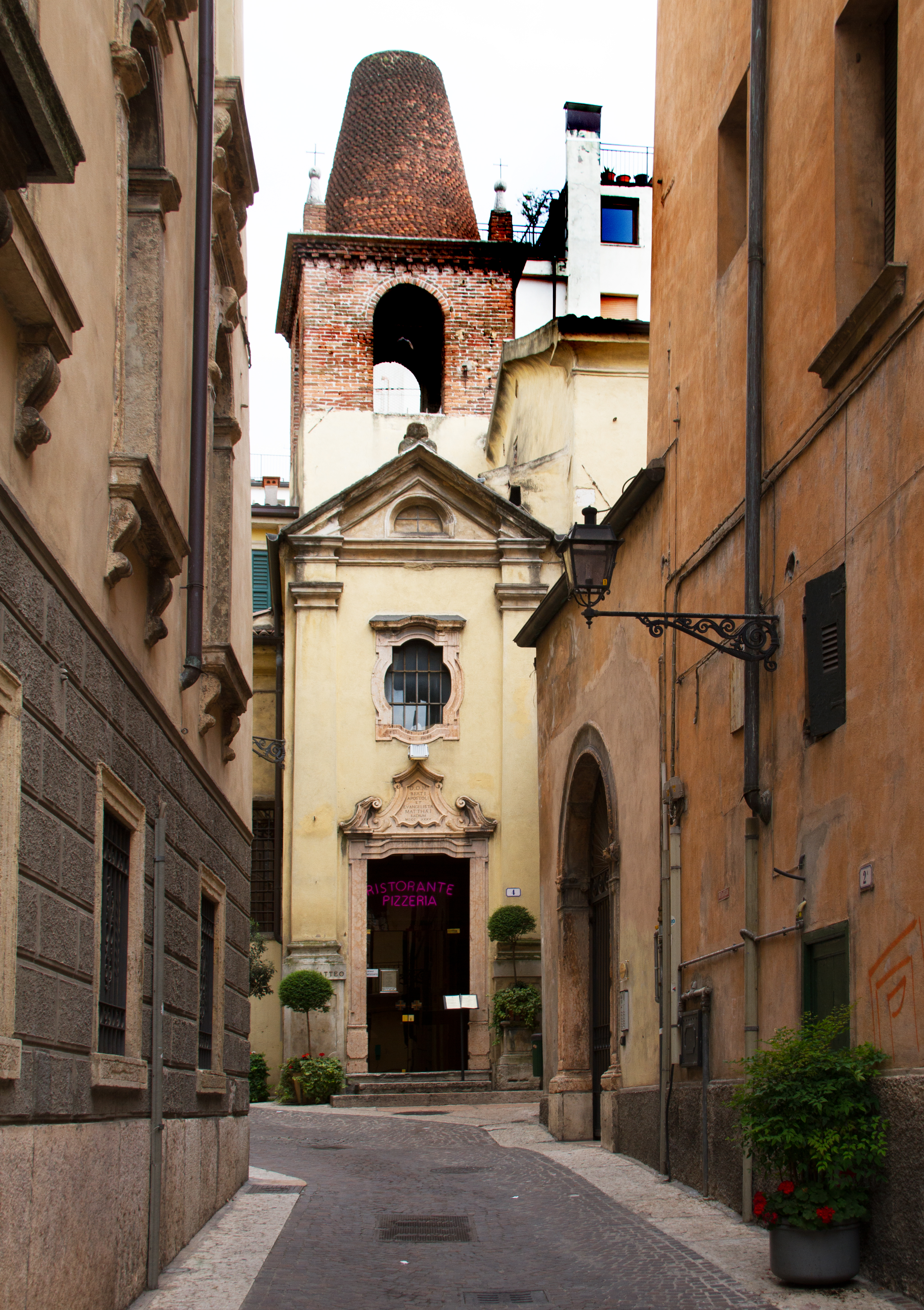
- The former church in 2014
- San Matteo con Cortile
- 45°26′30.3″N 10°59′38.0″E
- Location: Verona, Province of Verona
- Country: Italy
- Denomination: Roman Catholic
- Website: www.smatteo.it

History
- Status: Church
- Founded: Before 1105
- Dedication: Matthew the Apostle

Architecture
- Functional status: Deconsecrated
- Closed: 1806

San Matteo con Cortile is a former Roman Catholic church in the historic centre of Verona, Italy dedicated to Matthew the Apostle. It was constructed in the medieval period on the site of a Roman temple of Janus. The building was deconsecrated in 1806 and it was used for various purposes, and it currently houses a restaurant and pizzeria.

== History ==
The site of the church is believed to have originally been occupied by a Roman temple dedicated to the god Janus. Some parts of the temple still exist and are preserved beneath the church. The church was constructed in the medieval period, and the oldest known reference to it dates back to 1105 when part of it was donated to the Pomposa Abbey.

The church was deconsecrated in 1806, and since then the building has been used for various purposes. During World War I it was converted into a warehouse and a laundry. The church was subsequently used as an artisan carpentry workshop, and in the 1990s it was restored and converted into a restaurant and pizzeria called San Matteo Church.

== Architecture ==
The church is located in a side street of Corso Porta Borsari, near the Roman Porta Borsari. The 1990s restoration and conversion to a restaurant respected the original building and created a mezzanine level in the former nave.
