= Chenal du Four =

Channel in France

Coordinates: 48.359671°N 4.816132°W

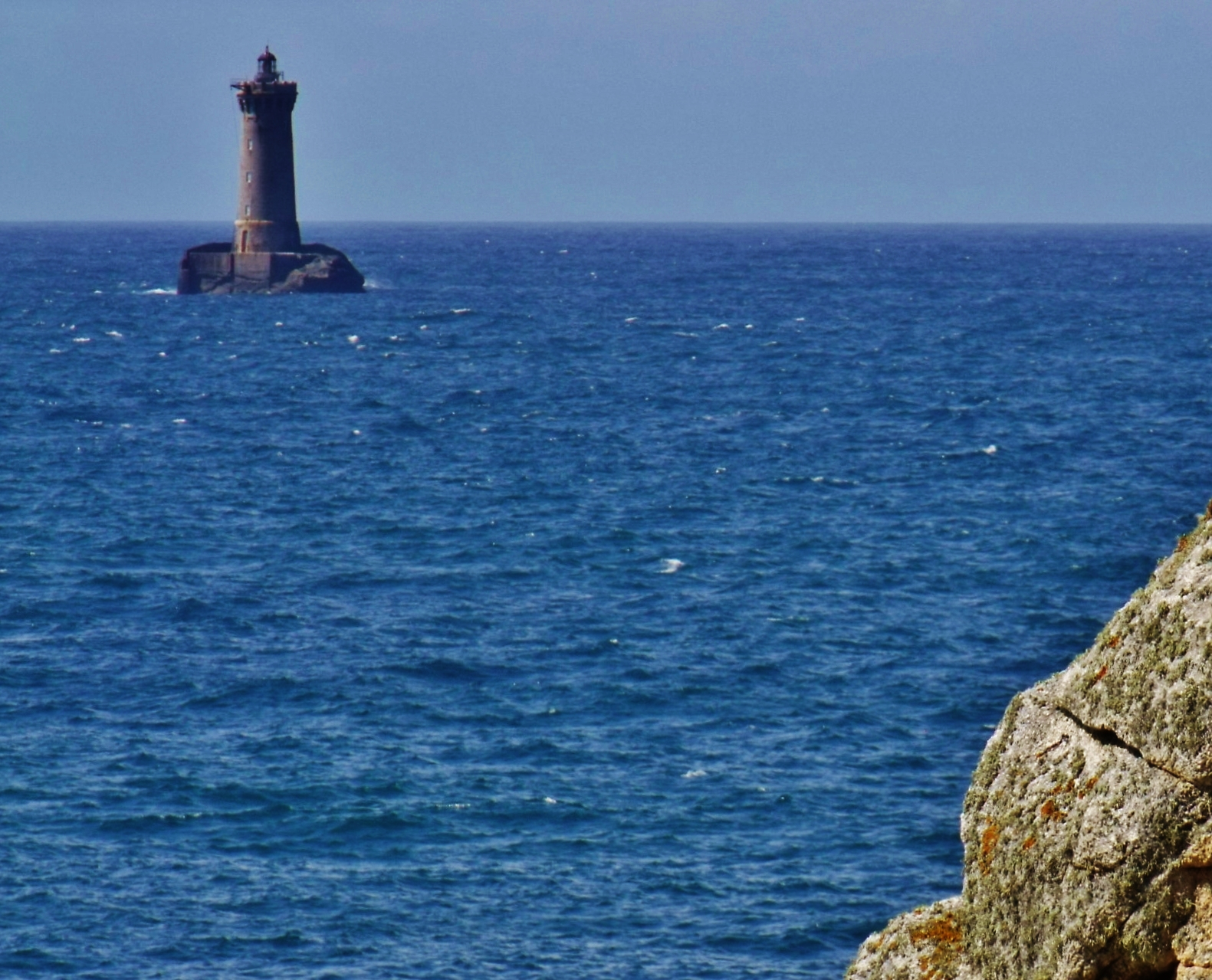
View of the Chenal du Four, 2011

The Chenal du Four is a waterway off the coast of Brittany in north-western France, in the area of Porspoder, between Pointe Saint-Mathieu and the Island of Béniguet. It is marked by six lighthouses including the Saint-Mathieu Lighthouse and the Kermorvan Lighthouse. The passage maintains a depth of at least 25 feet (7.6 m) at low tide, and is the usual path taken by yachts sailing between the English Channel with the western coast of France.

== See also ==
- List of canals in France
- List of waterways
