= Saint Matthew and the Angel (disambiguation) =

Saint Matthew and the Angel may refer to:

- Saint Matthew and the Angel (Caravaggio)
- Saint Matthew and the Angel (Rembrandt)
- Saint Matthew and the Angel (Reni)
- Saint Matthew and the Angel (Savoldo)
