= Abbey of Saint-Mathieu de Fine-Terre =

Abbey in Plougonvelin, France

Coordinates: 48°19′48″N 4°46′17″W

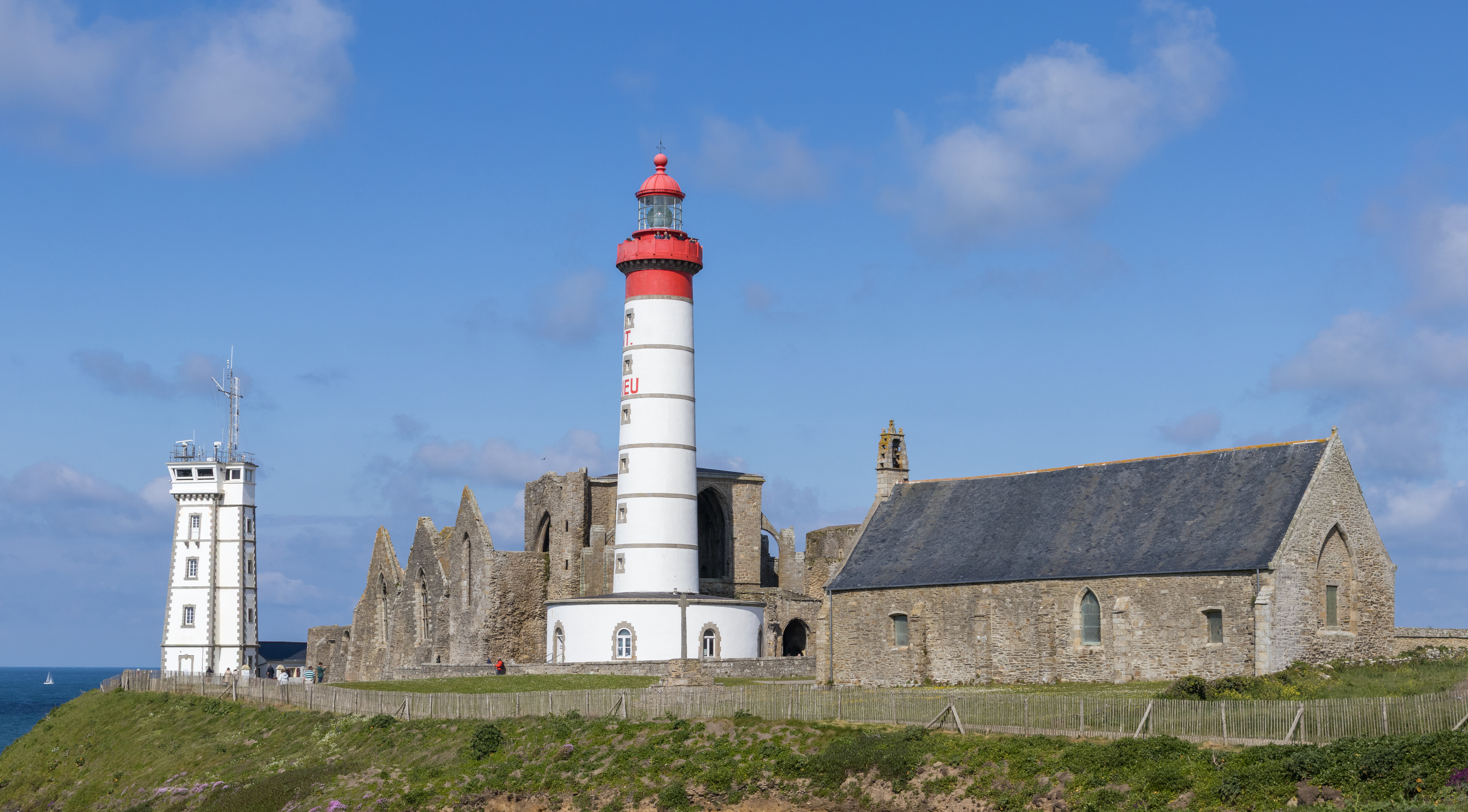
Ruins of the Abbey of Saint Mathieu, and the lighthouse

The Abbey of Saint-Mathieu de Fine-Terre (French: Abbaye Saint-Mathieu de Fine-Terre; Breton: Abati Lokmazhe Penn-ar-Bed) is a former Breton monastery, whose ruins are found in the territory of what is now the commune of Plougonvelin on Pointe Saint-Mathieu (Breton: Beg Lokmazhe), in the département of Finistère. The abbey gives the cape its name. It was dedicated to Saint Matthew the Evangelist, whose skull it housed. It was a Benedictine abbey, and was revived and reformed by the Maurists in the mid-17th century.

== History ==
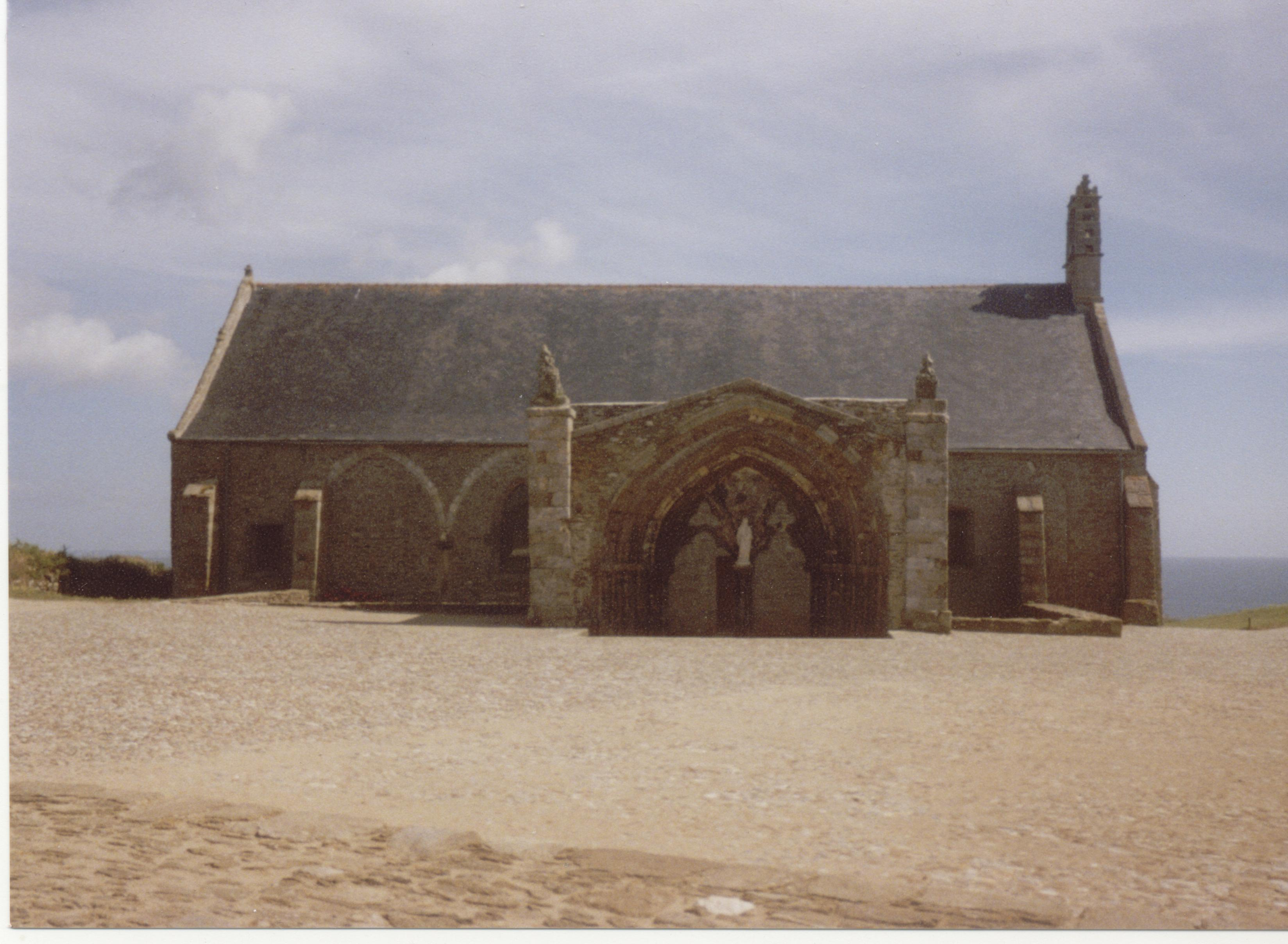
Chapel of Notre-Dame des Grâces near the abbey

According to legend the first abbey here was founded in the 6th century by Saint Tanguy, chosen for its isolated location among the lands he had inherited, extending from the river of Caprel (haven of Brest) to Penn ar Bed. This allowed the abbey to be generally cut off from the world but still accessible from its proximity to the sea.

== Bibliography ==
All (in French) unless otherwise noted.

- Dom Yves Chaussy, L'abbaye de Saint-Mathieu de Fine-Terre, Esquisse de son histoire, Bulletin de la Société Archéologique du Finistère, t. CXXII, 1993.
- Y. Chevillotte, Recueil de textes sur l'abbaye de Saint-Mathieu de Fin-de-Terre, Bulletin de l'association Histoires et choses d'autrefois à Plougonvelin, fascicule 17, 1997.
- M-C Cloitre, L'abbaye retrouvée, in Saint-Mathieu de Fine-Terre, actes du colloque, Bannalec, 1995.
- R. Daniel, La mort de l'abbaye bénédictine de Saint-Mathieu de Fine-Terre, Bulletin de la Société Archéologique du Finistère, t. XCII, 1964.
- J-Y Eveillard, La pointe Saint-Mathieu, in Saint-Mathieu de Fine-Terre, actes du colloque, Bannalec, 1995.
- H. Guillotel, Les vicomtes de Léon sont-ils les fondateurs de l'abbaye de Saint-Mathieu ?, in Saint Mathieu de Fine-Terre, actes du colloque, Bannalec, 1995.
- R. Largillière, Les saints dans l'organisation chrétienne primitive dans l'Armorique bretonne, Crozon, 1995
- G. Le Duc, La Translation de saint Mathieu, in Saint-Mathieu de Fine-Terre, actes du colloque, Bannalec, 1995.
- M. Le Goffic, Du probable agrandissement du collatéral sud de l'abbatiale au XIIIe siècle, in Saint-Mathieu de Fine-Terre, actes du colloque, Bannalec, 1995.
- B. Merdrignac, Les Navigations fabuleuses dans les Vies des saints bretons, in Saint-Mathieu de Fine-Terre, actes du colloque, Bannalec, 1995.
- F. Roudaut, L'abbaye de Saint-Mathieu, de l'introduction de la Réforme mauriste (1656) à la Révolution, in Saint-Mathieu de Fine-Terre, actes du colloque, Bannalec, 1995.
- R. Sanquer, Plougonvelin, Abbaye de Saint-Mathieu, Bulletin de la Société archéologique du Finistère, tome CI, 1973.
- B. Tanguy, Saint-Mathieu, le haut Moyen Âge : légende et histoire, in Saint-Mathieu de Fine-Terre, actes du colloque, Bannalec, 1995.
- A. Villecroux, La "Navigation" des moines de Saint-Mathieu, in Saint-Mathieu de Fine-Terre, actes du colloque, Bannalec, 1995.
