= Plougonvelin =

Plougonvelin Plougonvelen
- Commune
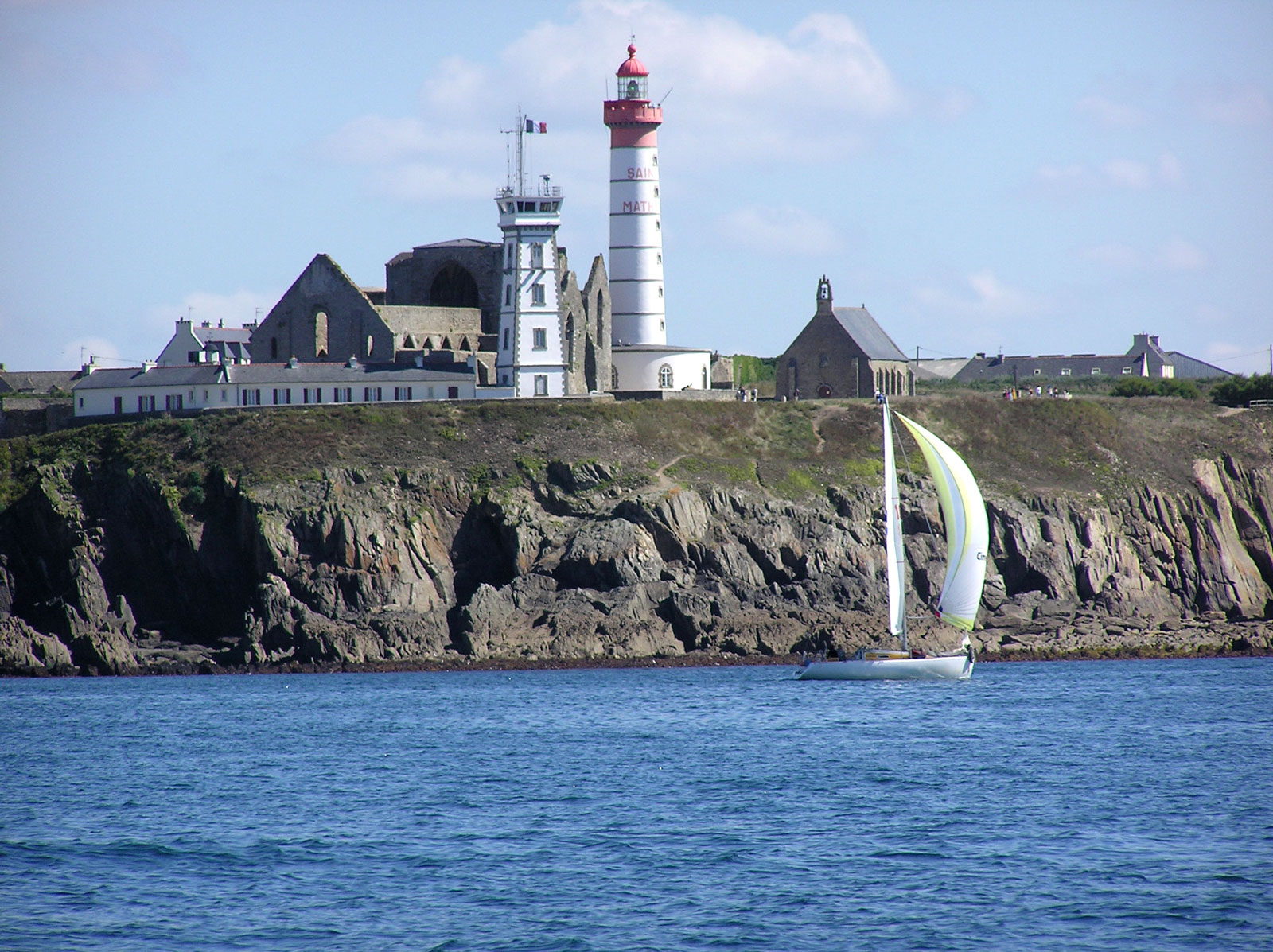
- The lighthouse at Saint-Mathieu Point

- Coat of arms
- Location of Plougonvelin
- Location within France Location within Brittany
- Coordinates: 48°20′37″N 4°42′37″W
- Country: France
- Region: Brittany
- Department: Finistère
- Arrondissement: Brest
- Canton: Saint-Renan
- Intercommunality: Pays d'Iroise

Government
  - Mayor (2022–2026): Bertrand Audren
- Area^{1}: 18.69 km^{2} (7.22 sq mi)
- Highest elevation: 88 m (289 ft)
- Lowest elevation: 0 m (0 ft)
- Population (2023): 4,521
  - Density: 241.9/km^{2} (626.5/sq mi)
- Time zone: UTC+01:00 (CET)
  - Summer (DST): UTC+02:00 (CEST)
- INSEE/Postal code: 29190 /29217
- ^{1} French Land Register data, which excludes lakes, ponds, glaciers > 1 km^{2} (0.386 sq mi or 247 acres) and river estuaries.

Plougonvelin (French pronunciation: [pluɡɔ̃vlɛ̃]; Breton: Plougonvelen) is a commune in the Finistère department of Brittany in north-western France.

== Geography ==
=== Climate ===
Plougonvelin has an oceanic climate (Köppen climate classification Cfb). The average annual temperature in Plougonvelin is 12.5 °C (54.5 °F). The average annual rainfall is 640.5 mm (25.22 in) with December as the wettest month. The temperatures are highest on average in August, at around 17.5 °C (63.5 °F), and lowest in February, at around 7.8 °C (46.0 °F). The highest temperature ever recorded in Plougonvelin was 34.6 °C (94.3 °F) on 12 July 1983; the coldest temperature ever recorded was −9.8 °C (14.4 °F) on 21 February 1948.

Climate data for Plougonvelin (1981–2010 averages, extremes 1929−2006)
Month	Jan	Feb	Mar	Apr	May	Jun	Jul	Aug	Sep	Oct	Nov	Dec	Year
Record high °C (°F)	16.2 (61.2)	15.5 (59.9)	21.8 (71.2)	27.8 (82.0)	29.4 (84.9)	32.4 (90.3)	34.6 (94.3)	33.2 (91.8)	29.8 (85.6)	24.0 (75.2)	20.0 (68.0)	16.4 (61.5)	34.6 (94.3)
Mean daily maximum °C (°F)	10.2 (50.4)	9.9 (49.8)	11.6 (52.9)	13.2 (55.8)	16.1 (61.0)	18.2 (64.8)	20.1 (68.2)	20.2 (68.4)	19.1 (66.4)	16.1 (61.0)	13.1 (55.6)	11.1 (52.0)	14.9 (58.8)
Daily mean °C (°F)	8.2 (46.8)	7.8 (46.0)	9.3 (48.7)	10.4 (50.7)	13.1 (55.6)	15.4 (59.7)	17.3 (63.1)	17.5 (63.5)	16.3 (61.3)	13.8 (56.8)	11.0 (51.8)	9.2 (48.6)	12.5 (54.5)
Mean daily minimum °C (°F)	6.3 (43.3)	5.7 (42.3)	7.0 (44.6)	7.7 (45.9)	10.1 (50.2)	12.5 (54.5)	14.5 (58.1)	14.7 (58.5)	13.6 (56.5)	11.6 (52.9)	8.9 (48.0)	7.2 (45.0)	10.0 (50.0)
Record low °C (°F)	−8.4 (16.9)	−9.8 (14.4)	−5.1 (22.8)	−0.6 (30.9)	2.5 (36.5)	6.2 (43.2)	8.0 (46.4)	8.7 (47.7)	6.6 (43.9)	0.8 (33.4)	−3.2 (26.2)	−6.0 (21.2)	−9.8 (14.4)
Average precipitation mm (inches)	67.3 (2.65)	54.7 (2.15)	53.6 (2.11)	52.1 (2.05)	46.8 (1.84)	30.1 (1.19)	32.5 (1.28)	38.6 (1.52)	49.1 (1.93)	69.2 (2.72)	67.4 (2.65)	79.1 (3.11)	640.5 (25.22)
Average precipitation days (≥ 1.0 mm)	13.9	11.2	11.2	10.9	8.6	6.5	6.4	8.0	8.0	12.7	13.2	14.5	125.1
Source: Meteociel

== Population ==
Inhabitants of Plougonvelin are called in French Plougonvelinois.

Historical population

Year	Pop.	±% p.a.
1793	1,369	—
1821	1,417	+0.12%
1841	1,472	+0.19%
1861	1,434	−0.13%
1881	1,470	+0.12%
1901	1,561	+0.30%
1911	1,680	+0.74%
1926	1,519	−0.67%
1936	1,545	+0.17%
1946	2,367	+4.36%
1954	1,470	−5.78%

Year	Pop.	±% p.a.
1962	1,439	−0.27%
1968	1,442	+0.03%
1975	1,567	+1.19%
1982	1,738	+1.49%
1990	2,167	+2.80%
1999	2,868	+3.16%
2007	3,565	+2.76%
2012	3,889	+1.75%
2017	4,174	+1.42%
2023	4,521	+1.34%

Source: EHESS and INSEE (1968–2023)

== Breton language ==
The municipality launched a plan for the Breton language through Ya d'ar brezhoneg on 16 June 2005. In 2008, 8.44% of primary-school children attended bilingual schools.

== Sights ==
- Abbaye Saint-Mathieu de Fine-Terre
- Fort de Bertheaume

== See also ==
- Communes of the Finistère department
