= Sant Mateu d'Albarca =

Sant Mateu d’Albarca
- Village
- Location of the town in Ibiza
- Coordinates: 39°2′21″N 1°22′58″E
- Country: Spain
- Region: Balearic Islands
- Time zone: UTC+1 (CET)
  - Summer (DST): UTC+2 (CEST)

Sant Mateu d’Albarca is a small village in the North of the Spanish island of Ibiza. The village is in the municipality of Sant Antoni de Portmany and is located designated road PMV 804–1. The village is 11.1 miles (17.9 km) North of Ibiza Town and 15.6 miles (25.1 km) of Ibiza Airport. 5.0 kilometres (3.1 mi) to the South west of the village is the coastal town of Sant Antoni de Portmany.

The village lies within the valley of d’Albarca. The valley is noted for its lemon and orange trees and fields of almond trees. The village is noted for its wines.
