= Pointe Saint-Mathieu =

Coordinates: 48°19′48″N 4°46′24″W

The Pointe Saint-Mathieu (French) or St Matthew Point (Breton: Lok Mazé) is a headland in the commune of Plougonvelin in Finistere Department in western Brittany, France. Flanked by cliffs 20 meters (66 ft) high, it was the scene of major Anglo-French naval battles in 1293 and 1512.

== Village ==
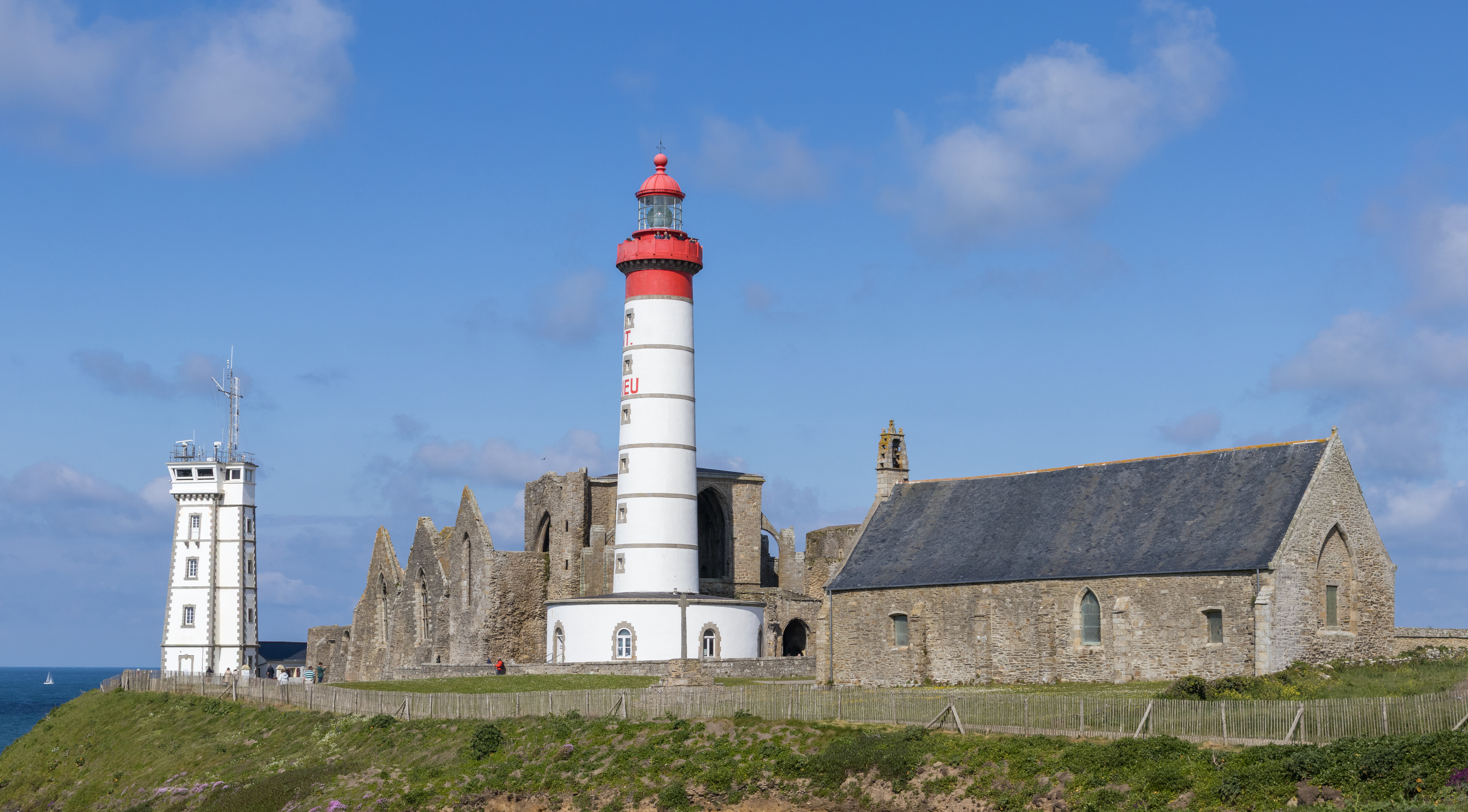
The Pointe Saint Mathieu with its sémaphore, lighthouse, and the abbey ruins

At present, there are only a few houses on the point, grouped around the abbey ruins. However, in the past, the settlement was not limited to the abbey and its dependents. Very soon a village was established along the coast for commercial potential and the possibilities for salvaging wrecks.

== Abbey ==
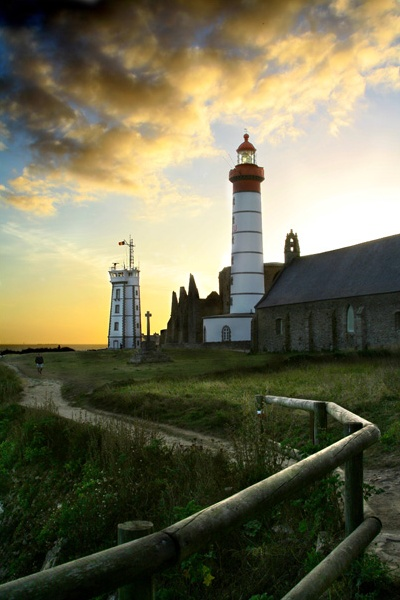

The abbey held many privileges - right to rushes, right to furnaces, rights to a twelfth of jet, right to markets, right to fairs (Henry IV of France had instituted, in 1602, 5 annual fairs and a weekly market), right to measure wheat and wine, etc...

In 1157 Hervé de Léon accorded the abbey the right of flotsam and jetsam on wrecks in all his fiefdoms; in 1390 the abbey received the right to take 10% of the hull, cargo and rigging of wrecked ships. To this right were added the right of remains, confirmed in 1602 by royal letters patent. He accorded this right to the monks for "all those who perish in the sea, and on the coasts at Saint Mathieu, Plougonvelin and le Conquet".

Today abandoned, the Abbaye Saint-Mathieu de Fine-Terre, was said to have held the skull of the apostle Matthew, now lost in the ocean off the point. Its ruins served as a set for the summer TV saga Dolmen.

== Lighthouse ==
The point also has a 56m high lighthouse, built in 1835.

== Signal station ==
The first signal station near the point was built in 1806, but the present one was built nearer the point in 1906, to give a view of the chenal du Four as the entrance to Brest. Progressively expanded in the 20th century, its top is now 39m above sea level, with lodging for spotters.

== The cenotaph (Memorial to sailors who have died for France) ==
Commissioned by Émile Guépratte and Georges Leygues after the First World War, it was built following the law of 26 July 1923. The stela (representing a sailor's wife) was designed by René Quillivic and inaugurated on 12 June 1927.

Since 2005, it has been open to the public and accompanied by a permanent exhibition of photos of disappeared sailors.

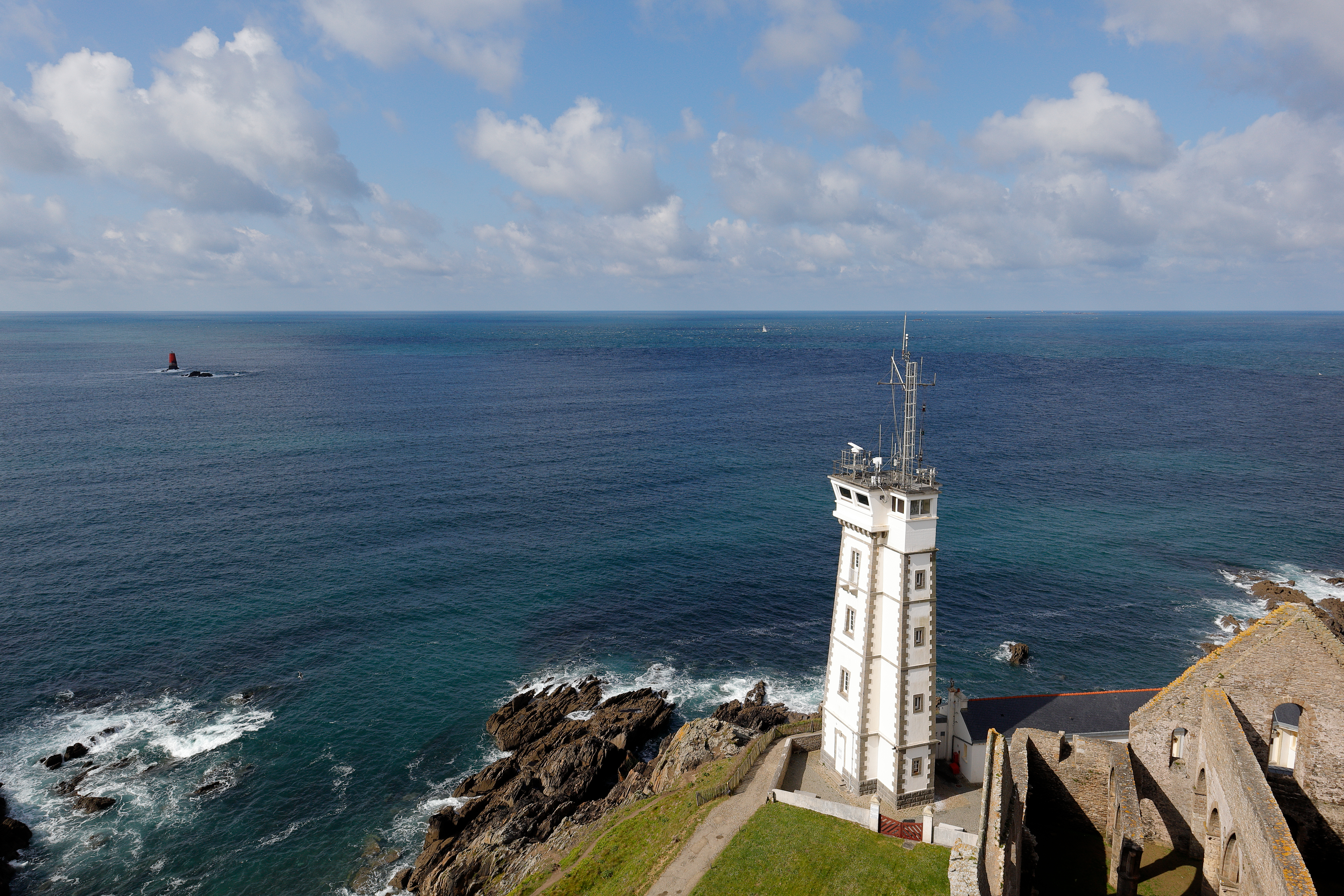

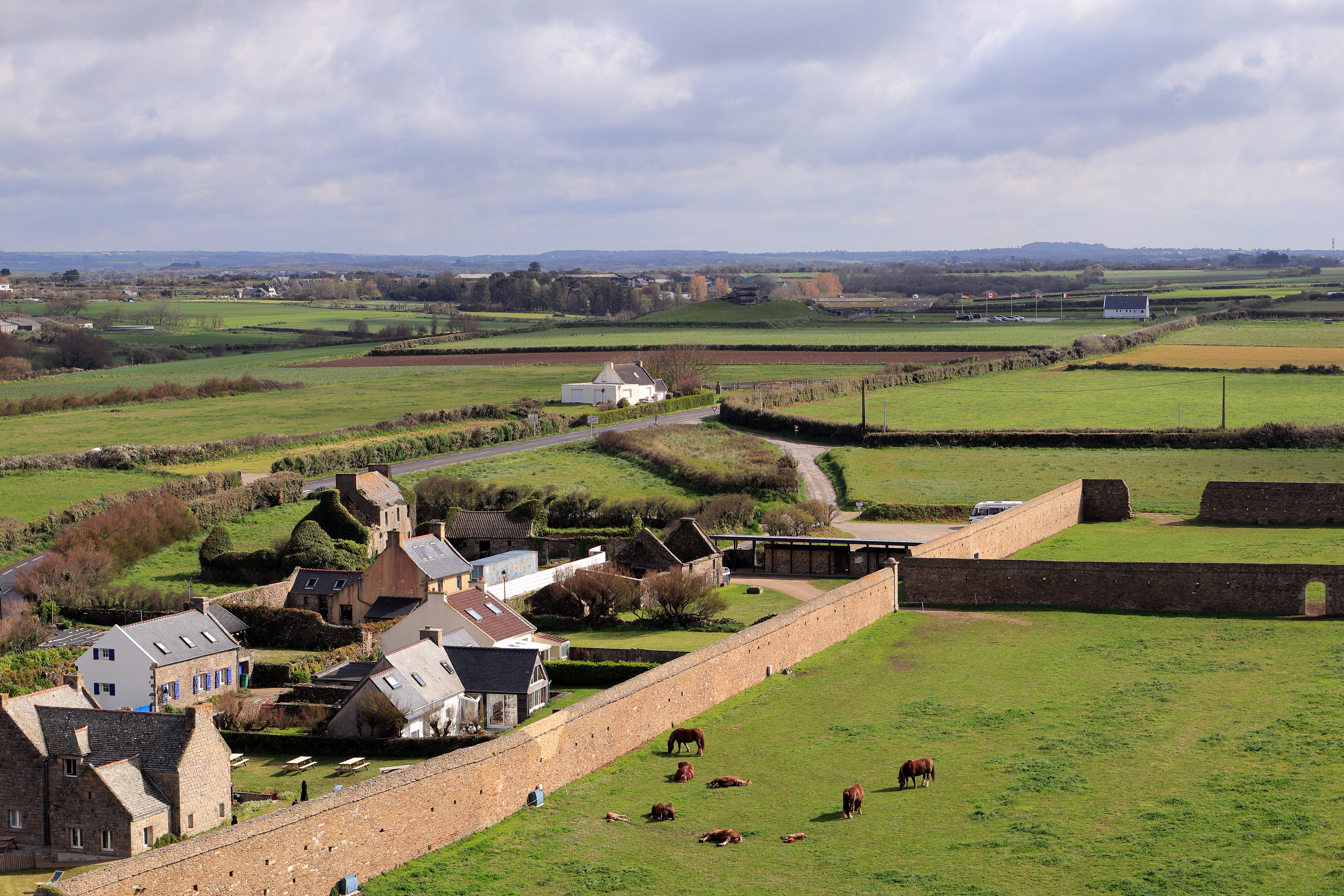

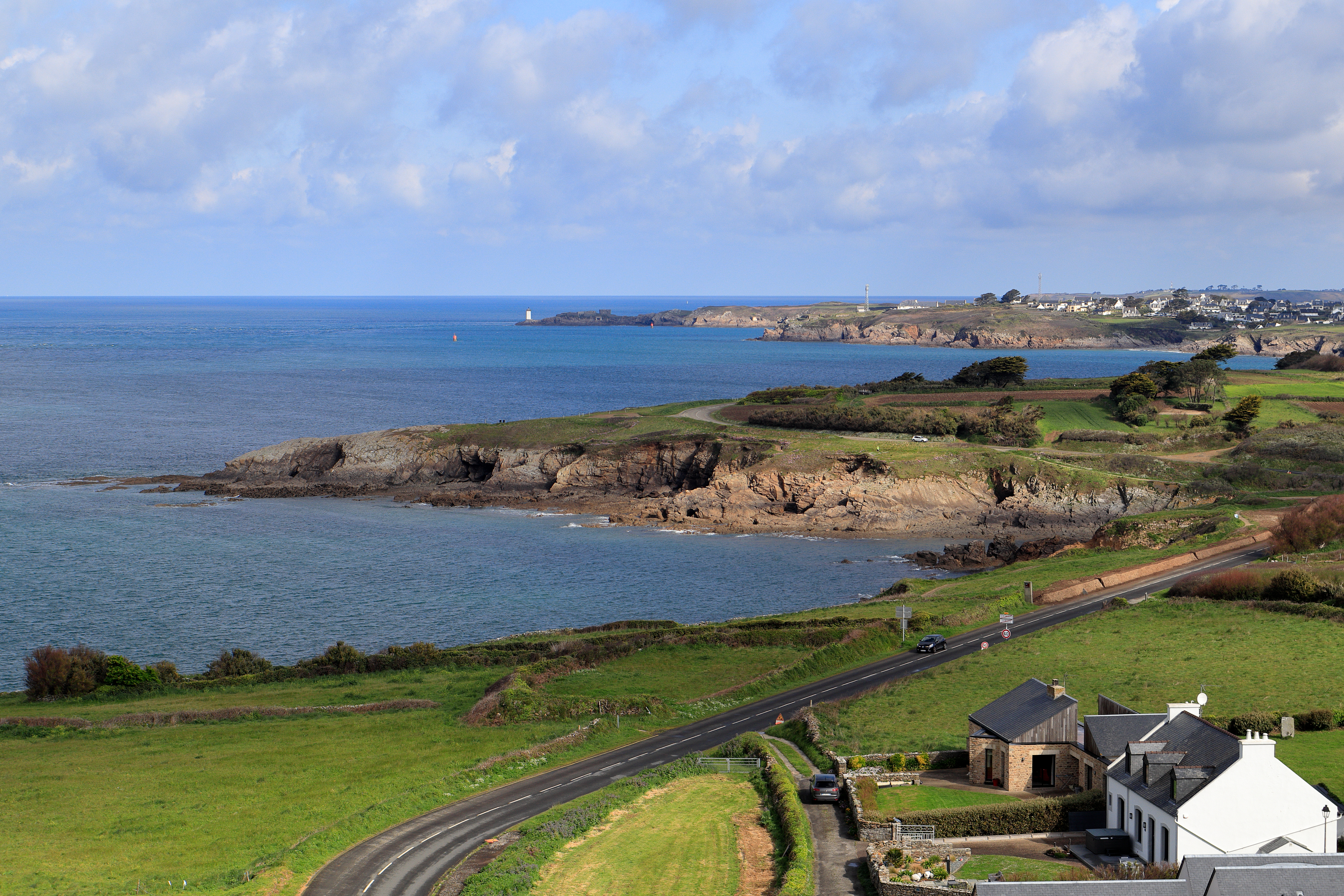
