= Puig des Molins =

Punic Necropolis

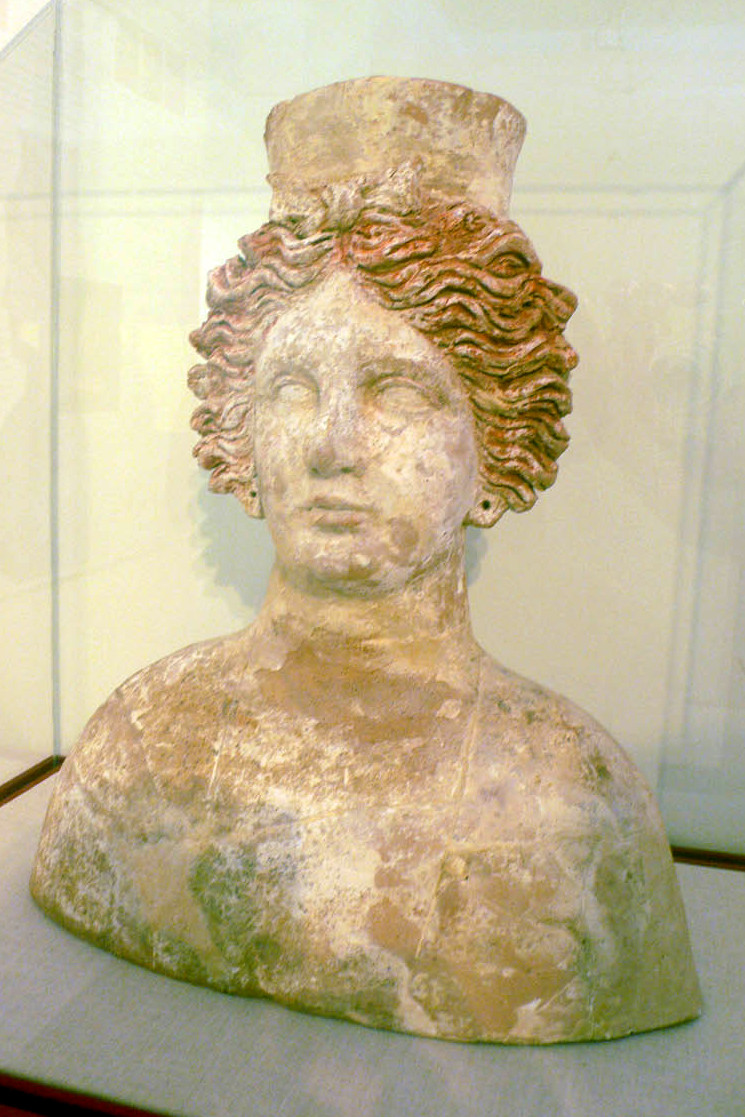
Bust of Tanit found in the Carthaginian necropolis of Puig des Molins, dated 4th century BC, housed in the Museum of Puig des Molins in Ibiza, Spain

The Puig des Molins (literally "Windmills' Hill") is a medieval Islamic rural property, and an archaeological museum in Ibiza Town (Island of Ibiza, Balearic Islands, Spain), containing the Punic Necropolis of Puig des Molins. The museum was opened in 1966.

== History ==
A museum holding the archaeological finds of Ibiza was originally proposed on 8 October 1929, when King Alfonso XIII visited the island. Following this, the necropolis was protected as an Historic and Artistic Monument on 3 June 1931. There was a proposal to build a new museum building to house all the archaeological finds made in 1935. This would replace the museum at Dalt Villa which had opened in 1907. The construction of this museum however, was delayed by the outbreak of the Spanish Civil War. Construction was eventually completed in 1965, with the museum opening in 1966.

The museum became state owned in 1984, however sadly it was closed in 1995. The museum remained closed for 17 years, reopening in 2012 after a 6 million euro investment allowed for its refurbishment.

== Collections ==
The necropolis is one of the world's best preserved, containing around 3000 tombs from the Punic era. The cemetery was founded in the 7th century B.C. by the Phoenicians, and was also later used by the Romans. The original necropolis covered around 10,000m², and today, the site covers 5ha. A bust of the goddess Tanit is the centrepiece of the museum collection. The collection is divided across five rooms, over a floorspace of 1514m².

The rooms are themed as follows:

- Death in the Phoenician period (626–525B.C.)
- Punic funerary rituals (525–25B.C.)
- Punic burials (525–25B.C.)
- Death in Roman times and Late Antiquity (600A.D.)
- Sainz de la Cuesta's collection

== See also ==
- Images of Puig des Molins on the Wikimedia Commons
