= Saint Germanus =

Saint Germanus or Saint Germanicus may refer to:

- Saint Germanus of Dacia Pontica (Dobrogea) (died early 5th century), feast day February 29
- Saint Germanicus of Smyrna (died 155), martyr
- Saint Germanus (Cermanus) (died 305), Spanish martyr (see Servandus and Cermanus)
- Saint Germanus of Auxerre (378–448), bishop of Auxerre who founded the Abbey of Saint-Germain d'Auxerre
- Saint Germanus of Normandy (died 480), also known as Germanus the Scot
- Saint Germanus of Capua (died 541), archbishop
- Saint Germanus of Paris (496–576), also Saint Germain of Paris
- Saint Germanus of Granfelden (died 675)
- Saint Germanus I of Constantinople (died c. 740), 39th Patriarch of Constantinople
- Sanctus Germanus, a titular see of the Roman Catholic Church

== See also ==
- Germanus (disambiguation)
- Saint-Germain (disambiguation)
- San Germano (disambiguation)
- St Germans (disambiguation)
