= Germanicus (disambiguation) =

Germanicus Julius Caesar (24 BC–19 AD) was a Roman general.

Germanicus may also refer to:

== People ==
- Germanicus of Smyrna (died 155), Christian martyr
- Germanicus Kent (1791–1862), co-founder of Rockford, Illinois
- Germanicus Mantica (died 1639), Roman Catholic bishop
- Germanicus Mirault (1796–1879), French surgeon
- Germanicus Young Tigner (1856–1938), American lawyer and judge

== Other ==
- Germanicus (opera), a 1704 opera by Telemann
- Germanicus trilogy, an alternate-history book series by Kirk Mitchell
- Germanicus, Ontario, a community in Canada
- 10208 Germanicus, an asteroid

== See also ==
- Germanico (Handel), a 1708 opera
- Germanicopolis (disambiguation)
- Germanus (disambiguation)
