= Germaine =

Germaine may refer to:

== People ==
=== Given name ===
- Germaine of Foix (1488–1536), French noblewoman and Queen of Aragon
- Germaine Acremant (1889–1986), French novelist and playwright
- Germaine Arnaktauyok (born 1946), Inuk printmaker, painter, and drawer
- Germaine Benoit (1901–1983), French chemical engineer
- Germaine Brown (born 1994), English professional boxer
- Germaine Cousin (1579–1601), French saint
- Germaine Greer (born 1939), Australian feminist writer and academic
- Germaine Marie-Thérèse Hannevart (1887–1977), Belgian teacher and women's rights activist
- Germaine Koh (born 1967), Malaysian-born Canadian artist
- Germaine Levant (born 1978), Dutch footballer
- Germaine Lindsay (1985–2005), British-Jamaican Islamist suicide bomber
- Germaine Mason (1983–2017), British-Jamaican athlete
- Germaine Pratt (born 1998), American football player
- Germaine de Randamie (born 1984), Dutch kickboxer and mixed martial artist
- Germaine Richier (1902–1959), French sculptor
- Germaine Roger (1910–1975), French actress and singer
- Germaine Rouault (1905–1982), French racing driver
- Germaine Schnitzer (1888–1982), French-born American pianist
- Germaine de Staël (1766–1817), Swiss-French author
- Germaine Suter-Morax (1896–1974), Swiss aid worker
- Germaine Tailleferre (1892–1983), French composer
- Germaine Thyssens-Valentin (1902–1987), Dutch classical pianist
- Germaine Tillion (1907–2008), French anthropologist, French Resistance member in World War II
- Germaine Marie Wiswald (also known as Germaine Pilorget) (1891-1988), Swiss engineer who worked with Marie Curie in Paris and at the Radium Institute in Geneva

=== Surname ===
- Gary Germaine (born 1976), Scottish footballer
- Theo Germaine, American actor

== Places ==
- Germaine, Aisne, France
- Germaine, Marne, France

== Other uses ==
- Germaine (olive), an olive grown in Corsica
- SS Empire Adventure, a cargo ship which carried the name Germaine L D between 1924 and 1931

== See also ==
- Germain (disambiguation)
- Germane, a chemical compound
- Germanus (disambiguation)
- Jermaine (disambiguation)
