= Zaandam =

- City
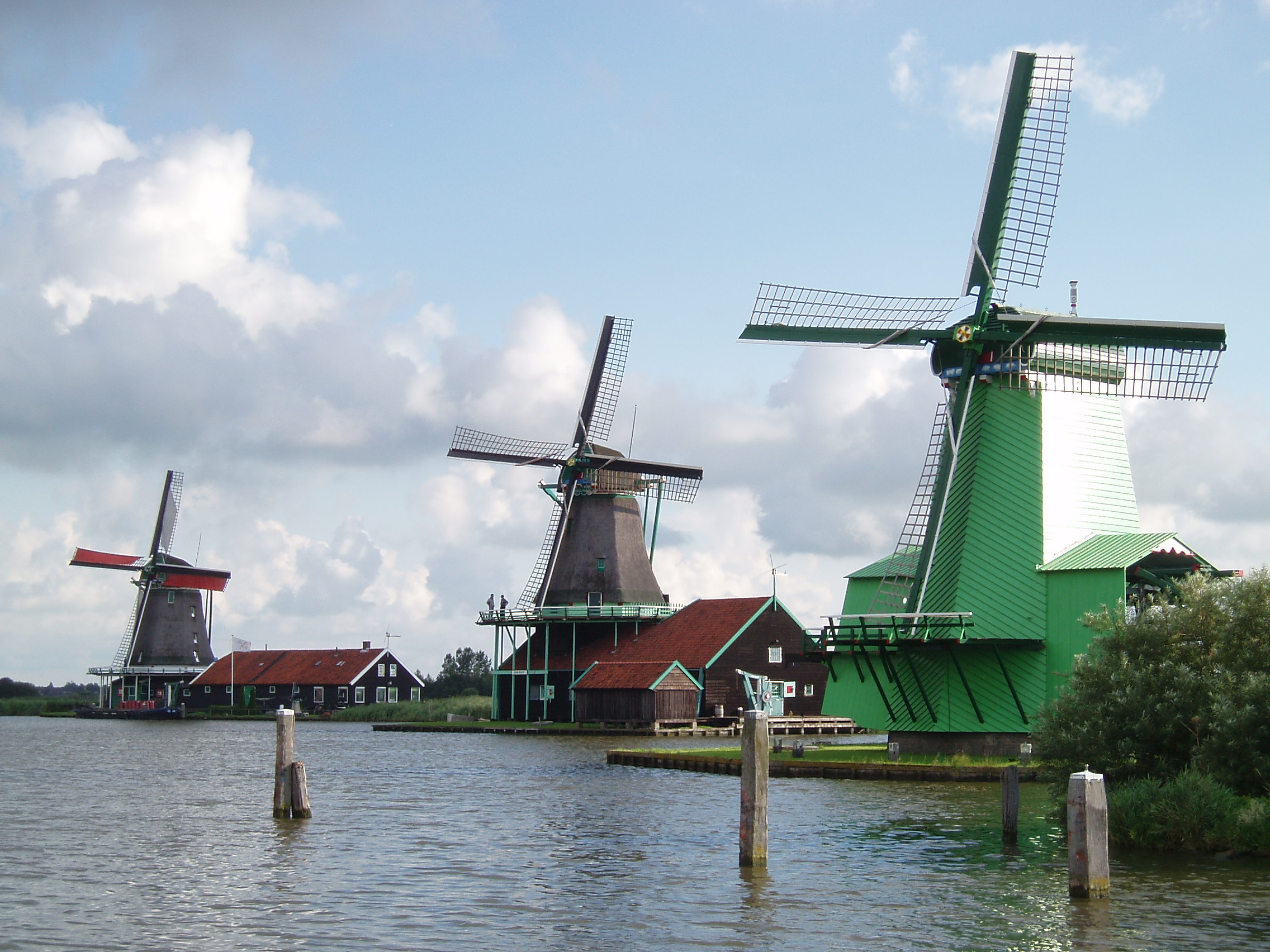
- Windmills at the Zaanse Schans north of Zaandam in 2007

- Flag Coat of arms

- Location within North Holland
- Coordinates: 52°26′N 4°50′E
- Country: Netherlands
- Province: North Holland
- Municipality: Zaanstad

Population (2017)
  - Total: 76,804
- Time zone: UTC+1 (CET)
  - Summer (DST): UTC+2 (CEST)

Zaandam (Dutch pronunciation: [zaːnˈdɑm]) is a city in the province of North Holland, Netherlands. It is the main city of the municipality of Zaanstad and received city rights in 1811. It is located on the river Zaan, just north of Amsterdam.

The statistical district Zaandam, which encompasses both the city and the surrounding countryside, has about 76,804 residents. Zaandam was a separate municipality until 1974, when it became a part of the new municipality of Zaanstad.

== History ==
The history of Zaandam (formerly called Saenredam) and the surrounding Zaan River region (the Zaanstreek) is intimately tied to industry. In the Dutch Golden Age, Zaandam served as a large milling centre. Thousands of windmills powered saws that processed Scandinavian wood for the shipbuilding and paper industries. A statue that commemorates this industry was commissioned from sculptor Slavomir Miletić, and the statue, De houtwerker ("The Woodworker"), was installed on 20 June 2004.

Zaandam is historically linked with the whaling industry.

In 1697, Tsar Peter I of Russia spent some time in Zaandam, where he studied shipbuilding. He stayed in a little wooden house built in 1632 but was soon forced to leave because he attracted too much attention from the local population. He moved to Amsterdam, where he studied at one of the wharves of the Dutch East India Company. His home in Zaandam was preserved and turned into a museum, the Czar Peter House. A statue honoring him was placed on the nearby Dam Square in 1911, and was declared a Rijksmonument.

In 1871, the impressionist painter Claude Monet lived in Zaandam for approximately half a year. During that time, he made 25 paintings of the area, including Houses on the Achterzaan, Bateaux en Hollande pres de Zaandam and A windmill at Zaandam.

== Economy ==
The first European McDonald's restaurant opened in Zaandam in 1971. The Albert Heijn supermarket chain (founded in nearby Oostzaan in 1887), now grown into the Ahold Delhaize retail company, is headquartered in Zaandam. Chocolate manufacturer Verkade also hails from Zaandam. There were 6,910 business establishments in Zaandam in 2019.

Football club AZ (Alkmaar Zaanstreek) was founded in Zaandam on May 10, 1967.

== Transport ==
There are two railway stations in Zaandam: Zaandam railway station and Zaandam Kogerveld railway station. Plans exist by the province of North Holland to extend the Amsterdam Metro to Zaandam.

== Gallery ==
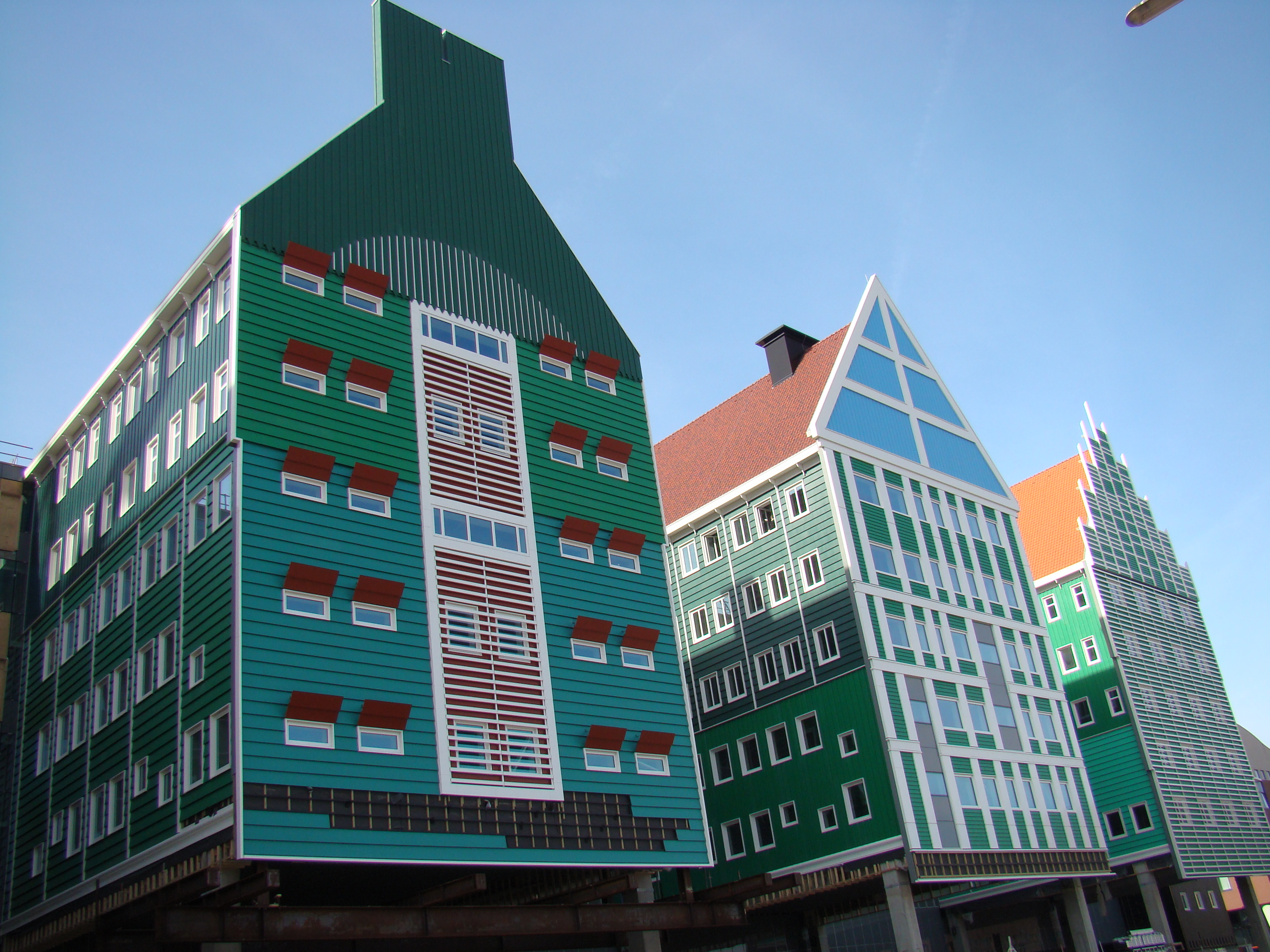
Zaandam City Hall

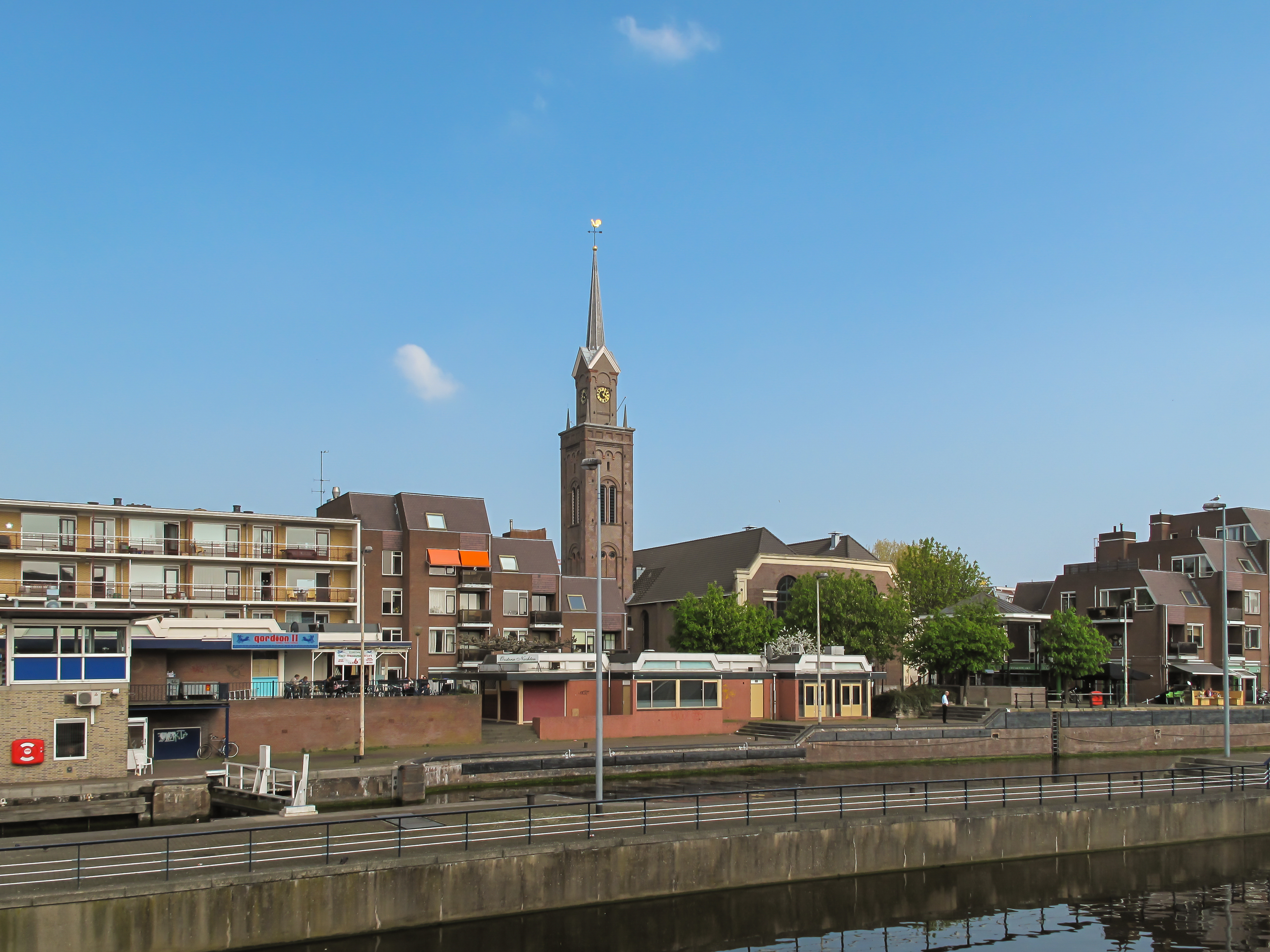
De Oostzijderkerk

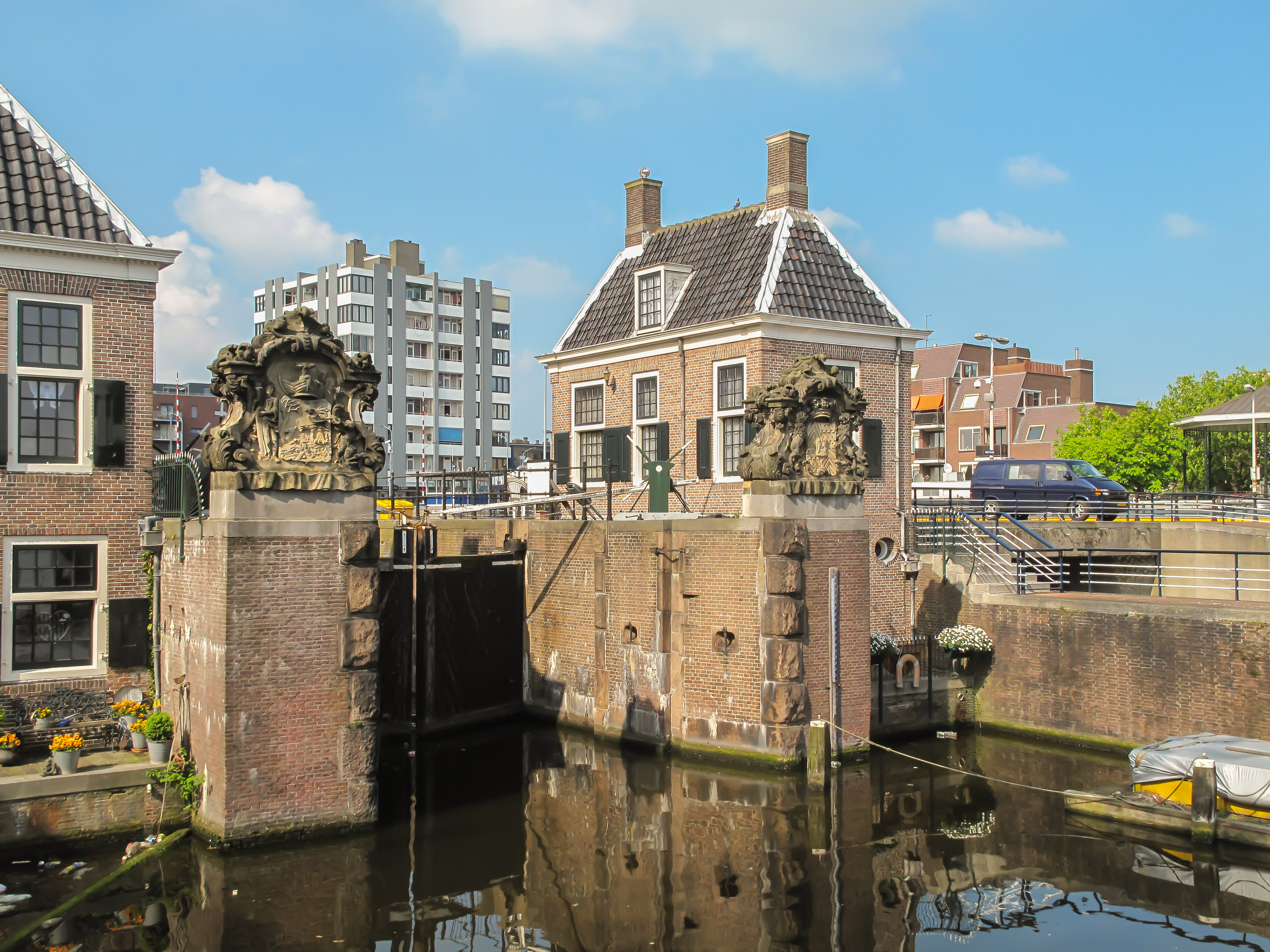
Zaandam, sluice

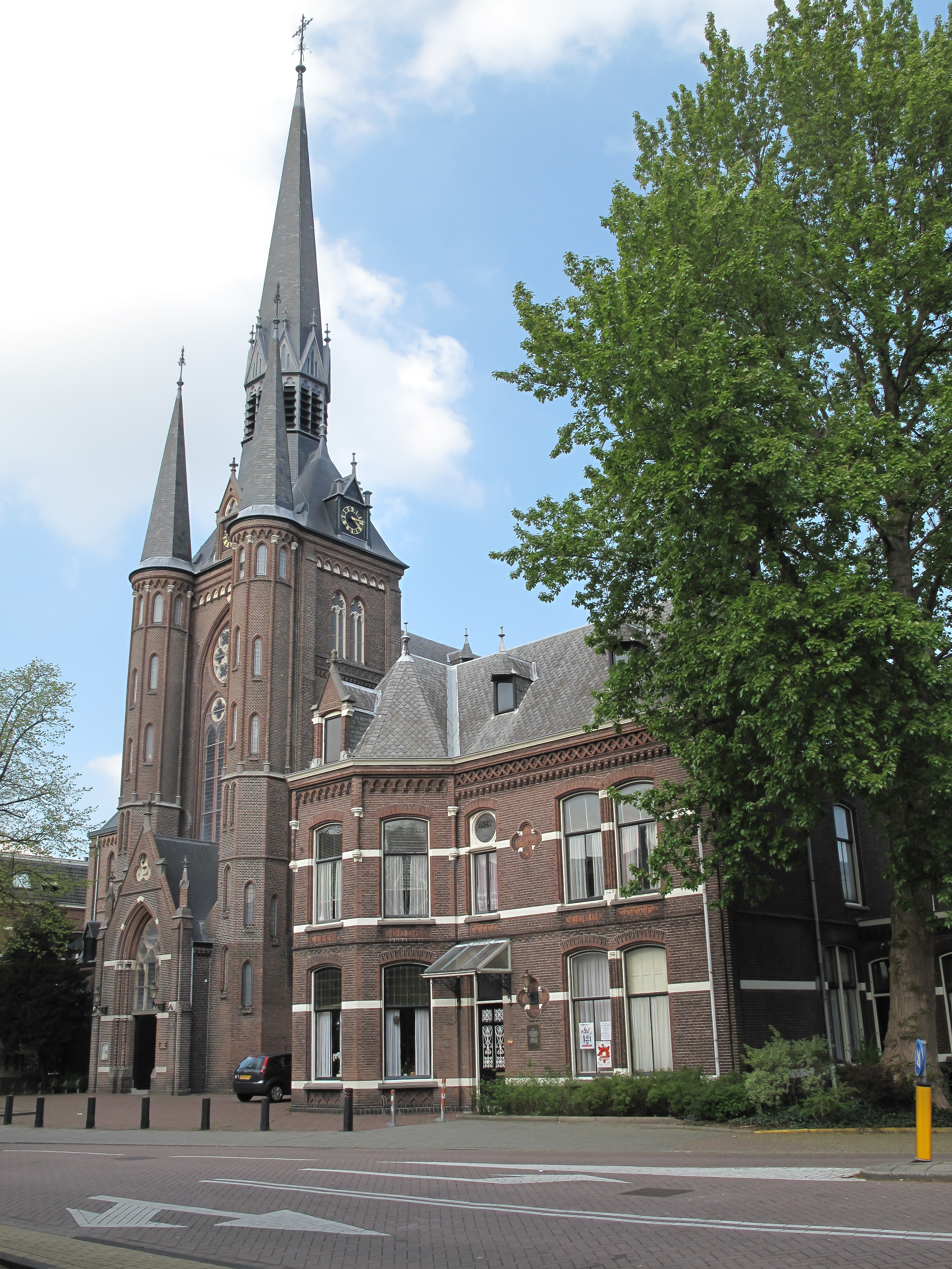
De Sint Bonifatiuskerk

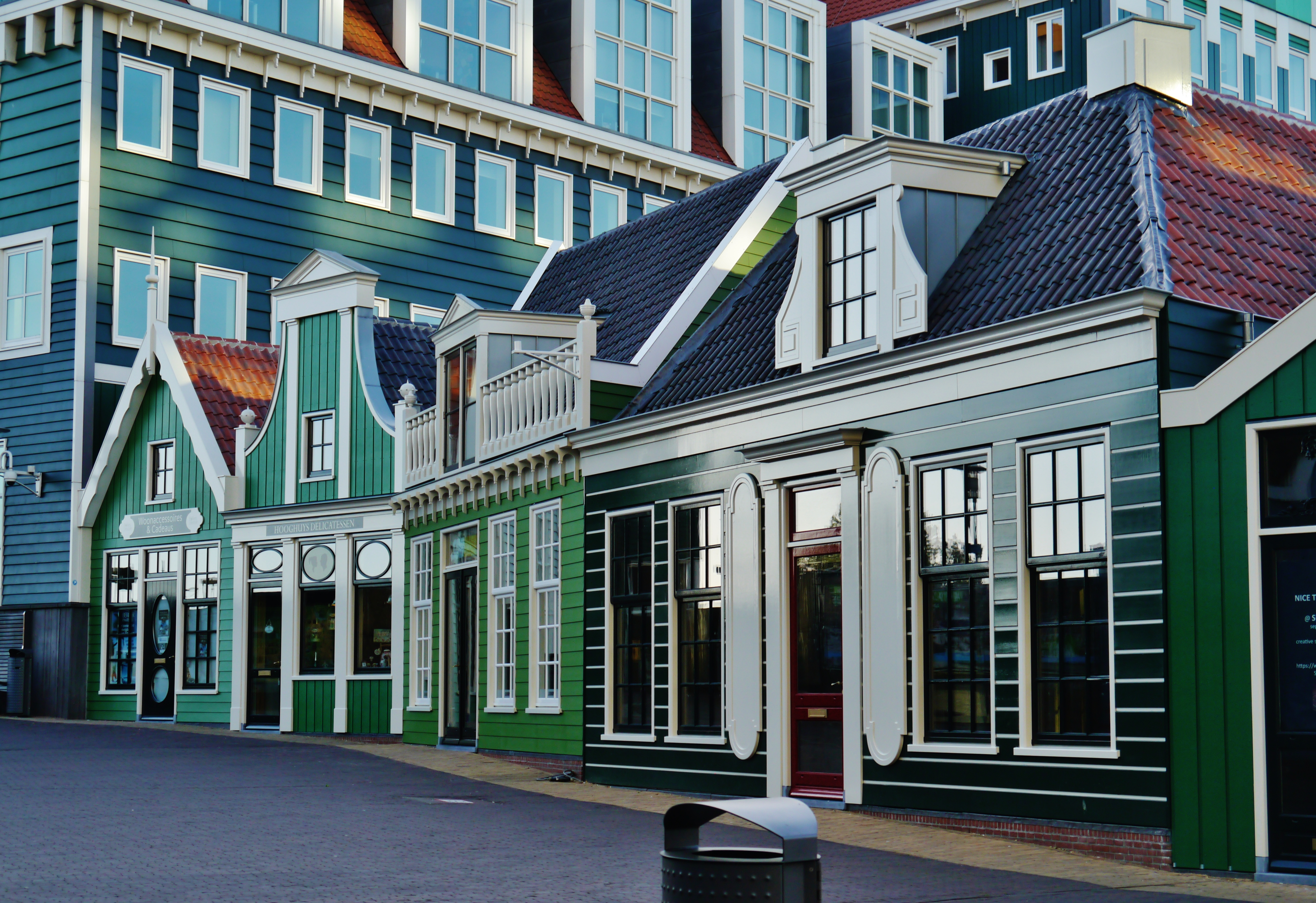
Zaandam downtown

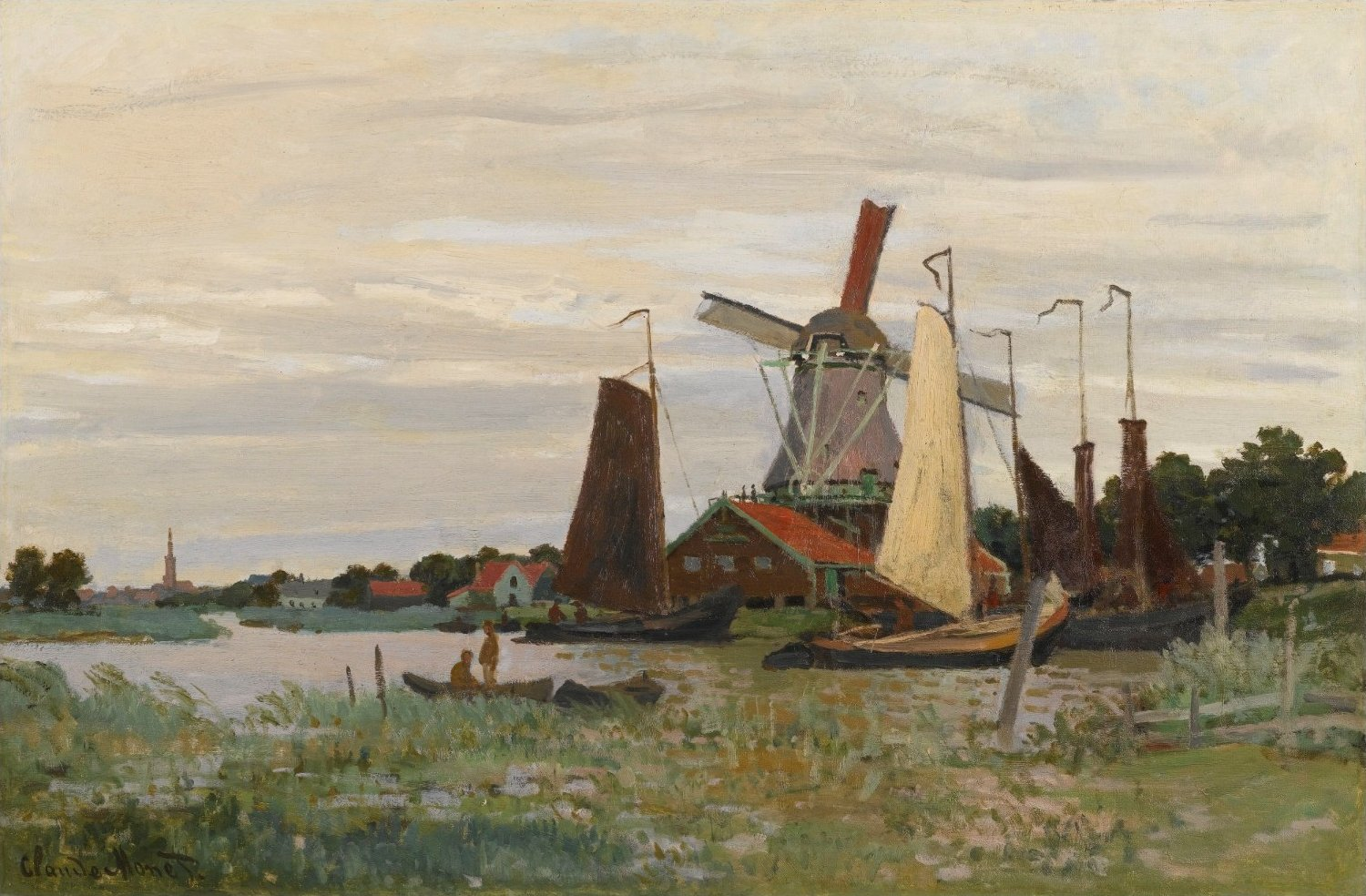
A windmill near Zaandam painted in 1871 by Claude Monet

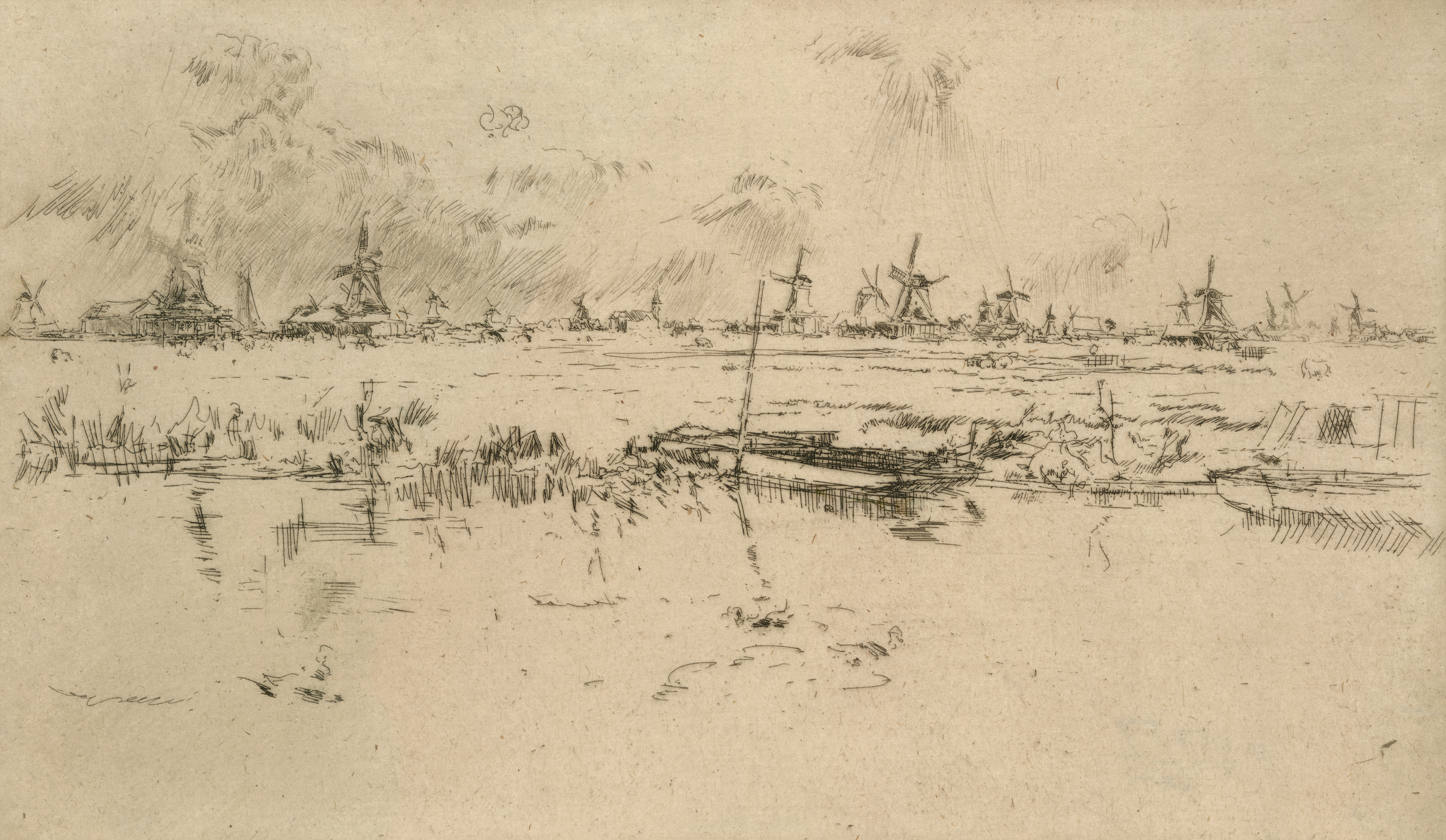
Zaandam circa 1889. Etching by James McNeill Whistler

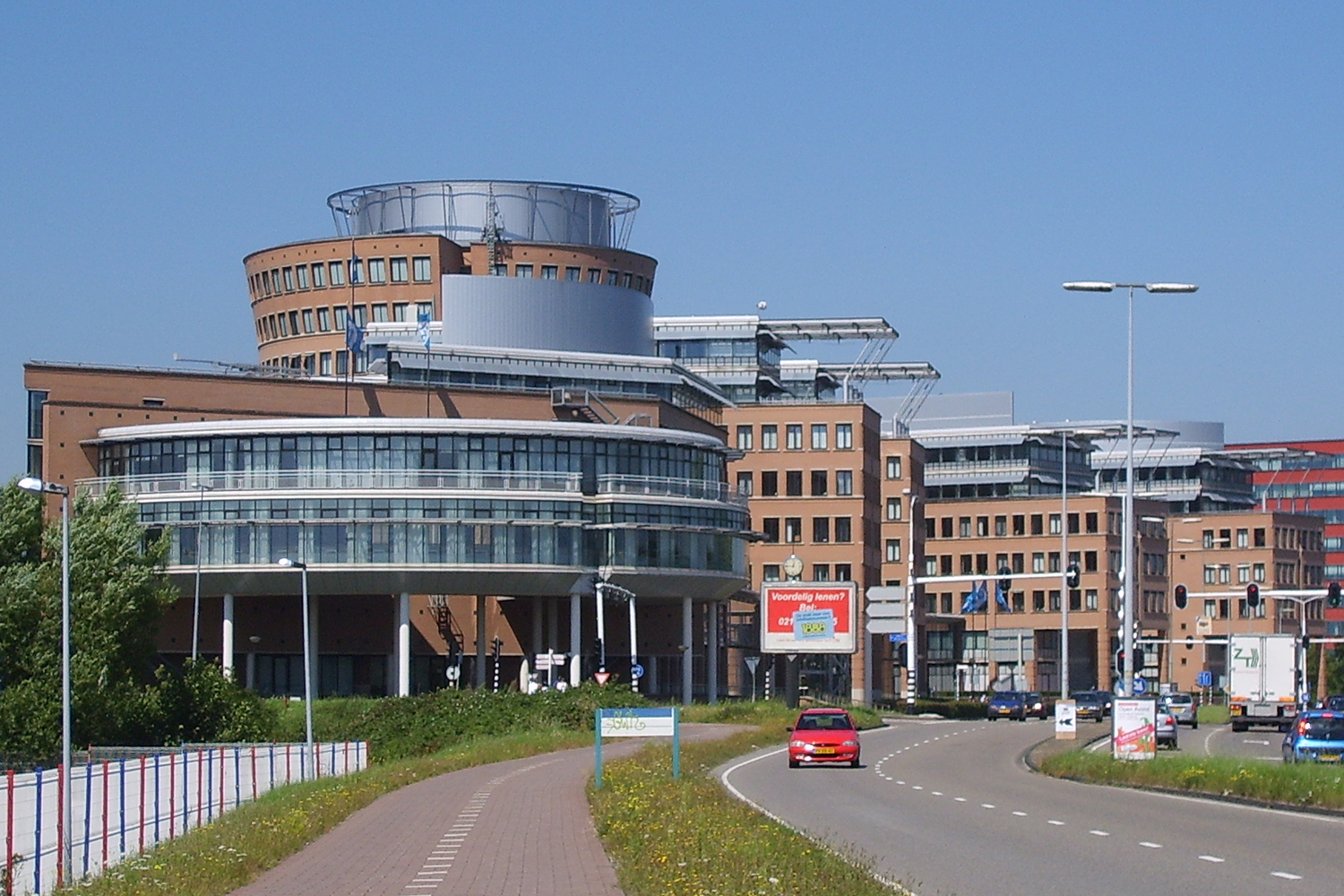
Albert Heijn headquarters in Zaandam

== Historical flags ==
Zaandam flag (1667)

Zaandam flag (1938)

Zaandam flag since 1938

== Notable people ==
- Han Bennink (born 1942), jazz musician
- Pieter Bleeker (1819–1878), ichthyologist
- Kees Bruynzeel (1900–1980), wood merchant
- Ali Bouali (born 1981), rapper
- Dirk Andries Flentrop (1910–2003), organ builder
- Niels Heithuis (born 1972), journalist and radio presenter
- Piet Kee (1927–2018), organist and composer
- Erwin Koeman (born 1961), football player and football coach
- Ronald Koeman (born 1963), football player and football coach
- Hendrik Lenstra (born 1947), mathematician
- Germaine Levant (born 1978), footballer
- Jos van Manen Pieters (1930–2015), writer
- Anton Mauve (1838–1888), painter
- Robert Molenaar (born 1969), football player
- Oğuzhan Özyakup (born 1992), football player
- Kathinka Pasveer (born 1959), flautist
- Johnny Rep (born 1951), football player
- Jan Saenredam (1565–1607), copperplate engraver
- Harm van den Dorpel (born 1981), conceptual artist
- Patricia van der Vliet (born 1989), model
- Elisabeth van Houts (born 1952), historian
- Jan Verkade (1868–1946), painter
- Arie Smit (1916–2016), painter
- Melissa Venema (born 1995), musician
- Owen Wijndal (born 1999), professional footballer
- Justin Kluivert (born 1999), professional footballer
- Rens van der Wacht (born 1999), professional footballer
