= Martyrdom of Polycarp =

Christian manuscript

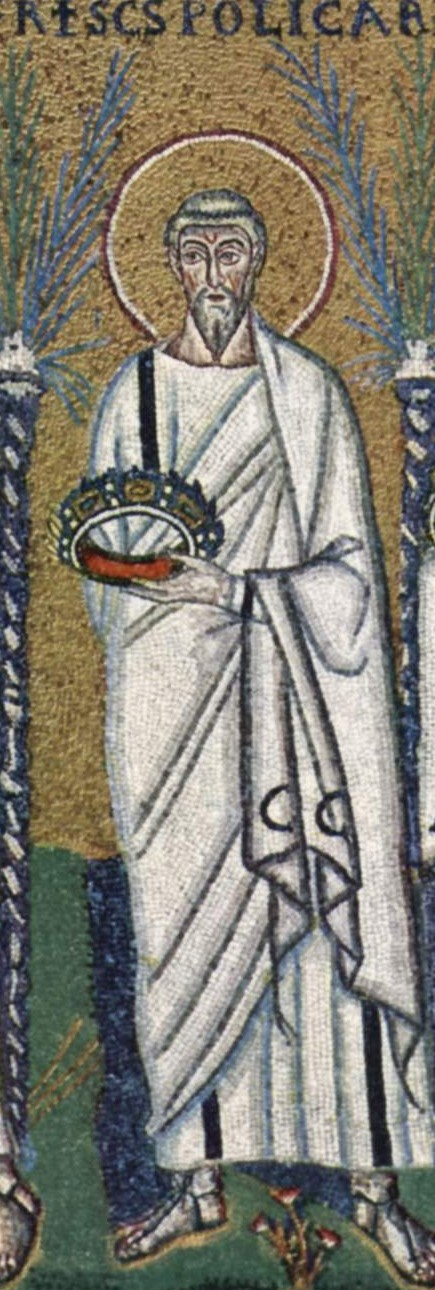
- St Polycarp, Bishop of Smyrna
- Author: Church Fathers
- Language: Greek, Latin
- Subject: Hagiography
- Set in: 2nd century
- Published: 4th century (Eusebius); 10th century (Latin manuscript); 10–13th century (Greek manuscripts)
- Text: Martyrdom of Polycarp at Wikisource

Martyrdom of Polycarp (Latin: Martyrium Polycarpi) is a manuscript written in the form of a letter that relates the religious martyrdom of Polycarp, Bishop of Smyrna (the site of the modern city of İzmir, Turkey) in the 2nd century AD. It forms the earliest account of Christian martyrdom outside of the New Testament. The author of Martyrdom of Polycarp is unknown, but it has been attributed to members of the group of early Christian theologians known as the Church Fathers. The letter, sent from the church in Smyrna to another church in Asia Minor at Philomelium, is partly written from the point of view of an eye-witness, recounting the arrest of the elderly Polycarp, the Romans' attempt to execute him by fire, and subsequent miraculous events.

The letter takes influence from both Jewish martyrdom texts in the Old Testament and the Gospels. Furthermore, the Martyrdom of Polycarp promotes an ideology of martyrdom, by delineating the proper conduct of a martyr.

== Content ==
The author writes in praise of martyrdom and deplores a would-be martyr who instead made sacrifice to the Roman gods to save his life. Polycarp, retiring in the countryside at 86 years of age, has a prophetic vision, and awakens realizing he must be burnt alive. Similar to Jesus, there is a betrayal to the authorities, and Polycarp comes forward so that two associates might be freed. Polycarp is brought to a stadium in Smyrna and encouraged to swear by Caesar and thus affirm that the emperor was a god. Polycarp declines, and the officials attempt to burn him alive. However, the fire miraculously avoids him in a circle, merely giving him a heavenly glow. Instead, Polycarp is stabbed; his blood goes everywhere, extinguishing the fire. The Jews influence the governor to burn the body so as to remove all evidence and avoid his body becoming a shrine. The author concludes by praising Polycarp and martyrs in general.

== Manuscript tradition ==
Modern critical editions of the Martyrdom of Polycarp (MartPol) are compiled from three different categories of manuscript: seven Greek manuscripts, the fourth century Ecclesiastical History of Eusebius of Caesarea, and a single Latin manuscript. The Greek manuscripts are all from the tenth to the thirteenth centuries. Of the seven manuscripts, six provide a similar account of the martyrdom of Polycarp and are thus believed to represent a single family of texts. The seventh manuscript, however, known as the Moscow Codex and dating to the thirteenth century, contains a more elaborate final chapter (22.2–3).

In addition to the Greek manuscripts there are also the writings of Eusebius related in his Ecclesiastical History, written around AD 324–325. Eusebius heavily summarizes the martyrdom and ends his account at 19.1, omitting the concluding sections that relate the transmission of the text, as well as the passion narrative parallels.

The Latin version of the Martyrdom dating from the tenth century exists as another account of the martyrdom but does not offer any variance upon the text. There is also an Old Church Slavonic translation.

Little corroborating evidence exists to assist in the dating of the Martyrdom of Polycarp, although Moss has suggested a date around 200 AD or later.

== Historicity ==
The Martyrdom of Polycarp, along with other documents of the Apostolic Fathers, plays a central role in bridging the New Testament and emerging Christian writers in the latter half of the second century, such as Justin Martyr and Irenaeus. In his youth he is said to have known the apostles and in his later years also Irenaeus.

A challenge to the dates could well call into question the authenticity of the document itself. Part of the skepticism regarding the MartPol text has centered on the number of parallels with the passion narratives of the Gospels, including Polycarp's prediction of his capture and death (5.2), the eirenarch named Herod (6.2), the arrest of Polycarp "with weapons as if he were a criminal" (7.1), and Polycarp being carried on a donkey back to Smyrna (8.1), miraculous occurrences such as the 'voice from heaven' urging Polycarp to 'Be strong and be a man!' (9.1). On the other hand, the fact of an overlay of interpretation does not necessarily in itself invalidate the historicity. Moreover, none of the non-miraculous elements are completely implausible; the name Herod, for example, is a common name for an aristocratic Jew and the association of Christians with donkeys is well documented.

The most difficult aspect of the narrative to accept as authentic is its treatment of Roman legal proceedings. Polycarp's trial is represented as taking place before one of the leading magistrates of the Empire on a public holiday, in the middle of a sport stadium, with no use of the tribunal, no formal legal accusation, and no official sentence. Though the trials of Christians, and of all subjects for that matter, were subject to the governor's procedural method of cognitio extra ordinem, this still does not explain the lack of a formal legal accusation and sentence. This lack of information muddles the case that the account is historically reliable; Roman capital trial procedure would presumably have been well known to the population of the time. The Martyrdom of Polycarp is also a theological composition designed to support a particular understanding of martyrdom in relation to the Christian Gospel; the question is how much, if any, of the narrative is from a historical base, and how much was modified or outright invented for theological purposes.

== Literary form ==
The Martyrdom of Polycarp is recognized as taking on two literary forms. It is simultaneously considered to be a letter as well as a martyr act.

=== Letter ===
The construction of the text follows an epistolary format. Specifically, it is a letter sent by the church in Smyrna to the church in Philomelium but was meant to be circulated to all the congregations in the region. The letter abides by the following structure: an initial greeting and blessing (1.1–2), followed by the body of material about the story of Polycarp's death (5.1–18.3), and a closing afterwards (19.1–20.2). By the second century, the authority of Paul the apostle and his epistles to the congregations had already been established. Thus the epistolary form was well recognized and used in early Christian literature.

=== Martyr acts ===
The Martyrdom of Polycarp is also the earliest of the martyr acts as a genre in the ancient Christian tradition. This martyrdom theme enters Christian literature through the early Jewish martyrs' literature found in 2 Maccabees 6–7, in the Old Testament, and through the account of the death of Stephen in Acts 7 in the New Testament. The motifs of complete surrendering of will, and a steadfast behavior in the face of suffering are common in these acts would become popular events in the mindset of Christians who were persecuted.

== Martyrdom ideology ==
In addition to attempting to edify its audience, the MartPol advances an argument for a particular understanding of martyrdom, with Polycarp's death as its prized example. The letter begins with an opposition of two martyr examples in which one is marked as good, and the other as bad. These examples are in sections 2–4 of the letter, where the noble Germanicus of Smyrna is praised for his steadfast example, as well the example of Quintus who expressed an urge for martyrdom and sought it out. Polycarp thus serves as a testimony of proper discipleship and imitation of the Lord in his martyrdom.

"Blessed and noble, therefore, are all the martyrdoms that have occurred according to the will of God. For we must be reverent and attribute the ultimate authority to God." (2.1)

Parallels with the passion narrative of Jesus Christ provide validation and value to the death of Polycarp. This imitatio Christi comes to be central to this ideology of martyrdom. It is thus the completion of this imitation through death, as did Christ, that makes the witness a martyr.

== Relation to scripture ==
The author of the Martyrdom displays significant knowledge of the scriptures. Beginning with the case of the Old Testament which is rooted in Jewish martyrology. In regards to the New Testament we find more references. The most prominent among them being the blessing at the end of the introduction (parallel to Jude 2), the charge to think always of others in 1.2 (parallel to Philippians 2:4), the recollection of the mystical visions of the martyrs in 2.3 (parallel to 1 Corinthians 2:9), the warning that Christians should not seek martyrdom in 4.1 (parallel to Matthew 10:23), the account of Polycarp's submission to the authorities in 7.1 (parallel to Acts 21:14) and finally the observation that governing authorities receive their power from God in 10.2 (parallel to Romans 13:1 and 1 Peter 2:13–14).

The letter draws significant and deep parallels to the gospels. These examples include:

- (7.2–3) Polycarp serving as a host for a final meal and agonizing in prayer before his arrest (Matthew 26:36–46)
- (8.1) Escort back to Smyrna on a donkey (Matthew 21:1–11)
- (9.2–10.1) Interrogation by a high Roman authority (John 18:28)
- (6.1–2) Betrayal by a friend, a Judas figure (Matthew 26:47–49)
- (8.2–3) Interrogation by Herod (Luke 23:6–12)
- (7.2) Host at a final meal (Matthew 26:17–29)
- (12.2–13.1) Jews inciting death of Polycarp (John 19:12–16)
- (5.1) Prayer for churches (John 17:1–26)

Such correspondence between these events and those of the canonical passion narratives might cast doubt on the former's historical veracity. Other scholars have argued that it is difficult to establish dependence on particular New Testament texts and have pointed to the influence of Greek philosophy and early Christian Biblical interpretation on the account.

== See also ==
- Martyrology

== Bibliography ==
- Martyrdom of Polycarp, Encyclopaedia Britannica, 2018
- Bobichon, Philippe, La plus ancienne littérature martyriale in Histoire de la littérature grecque chrétienne, t. II/5 : De Paul apôtre à Irénée de Lyon, B. Pouderon and E. Norelli (dir.), Paris, Cerf, 2013, pp. 619–647 online
- Foster, Paul; Parvis, Sara (2007). Writings of the Apostolic Fathers. London: Continuum International.
- Hartog, Paul, Polycarp's Epistle to the Philippians and the Martyrdom of Polycarp. Introduction, Text, and Commentary, New York, Oxford University Press, 2013.
- Jefford, Clayton; Harder, Kenneth; Amezaga, Louis (1996). Reading the Apostolic Fathers: An Introduction. Peabody, Massachusetts: Hendrickson Publishers. ISBN 9781565631540.
- Moss, Candida R. (2010). "On the Dating of Polycarp: Rethinking the Place of the Martyrdom of Polycarp in the History of Christianity". Early Christianity. 1 (4): 539–574. doi:10.1628/186870310793597051.
- Moss, Candida R. (2012). "Nailing Down and Tying Up: Lessons in Intertextual Impossibility from the Martyrdom of Polycarp". Vigiliae Christianae. 66: 1–20.
- Pratscher, Wilhelm (2007). The Apostolic Fathers: An Introduction. New York: T&T Clark.
- Sailors, Timothy B. "Bryn Mawr Classical Review: Review of The Apostolic Fathers: Greek Texts and English Translations", Bryn Mawr Classical Review
- Khomych, Taras (2012). "An Early Church Slavonic Translation of the Martyrdom of St Polycarp": Three Decades Later". Analecta Bollandiana. 130 (2): 294–302. doi:10.1484/J.ABOL.5.101802.
