= Tigner =

Tigner is a surname. Notable people with the surname include:

- Eddie Tigner (1926–2019), American blues pianist, keyboardist, singer, and songwriter
- Germanicus Young Tigner (1856–1938), American judge and politician
- Marcy Tigner (1921–2012), American Christian children's entertainer
- Maury Tigner (born 1937), American physicist
- Brooks K. Tigner (born 1953), American journalist and author
