= Ottaviano Tenerani =

Italian keyboard player, conductor, and musicologist

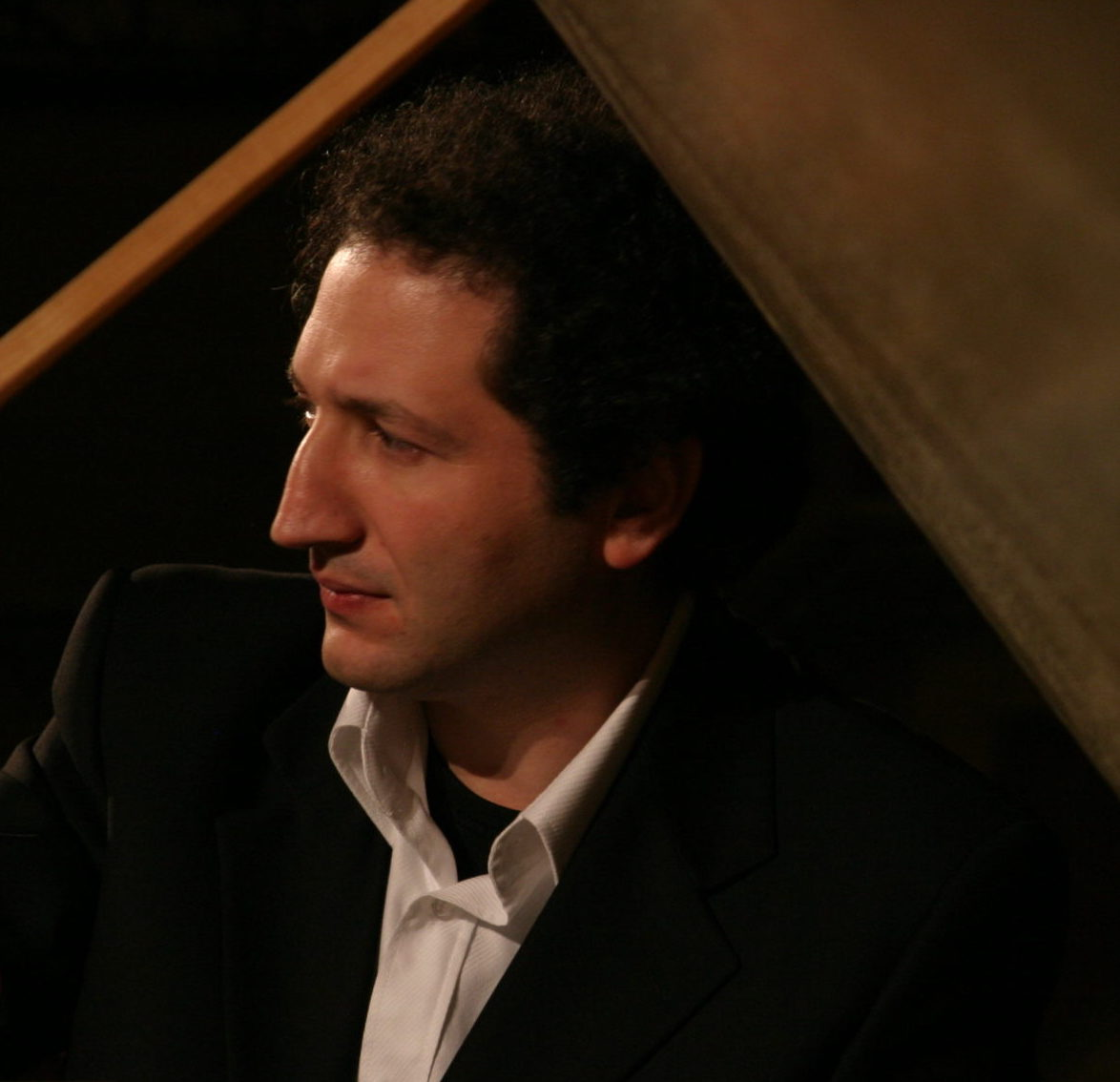

Background information
- Born: February 14, 1969 (age 57); Pontedera, Italy
- Origin: Italy
- Genres: Baroque, Classical
- Occupations: Conductor, Musicologist,
- Instrument: Keyboard (period instruments)
- Years active: 1998–present
- Labels: Sony Classical, Deutsche Harmonia Mundi, CPO, Tactus, Brilliant Classics, Dynamic
- Member of: Il Rossignolo

Ottaviano Tenerani (born 14 February 1969, in Pontedera, Italy) is an Italian keyboard player, conductor, musicologist. He is the leader of Il Rossignolo, an ensemble on period instruments that he founded in 1998 together with the flautist Marica Testi and the recorder and oboe player Martino Noferi.

== Biography ==
Ottaviano Tenerani who has specialized in the interpretation of baroque and classical music, is active both as performer and researcher. He has appeared as conductor and keyboard player in hundreds of concerts and numerous recordings for labels such as Sony Classical. / Deutsche Harmonia Mundi, CPO, Tactus, Brilliant Classics, and Dynamic.

Much involved in musicological research, he has presented modern day first performances of vocal and instrumental music by Alessandro Scarlatti, Georg Friedrich Händel, Antonio Caldara, Johann Joachim Quantz, Giovanni Battista Sammartini, Orazio Caccini and Giovanni Battista Martini.

He discovered the serenade Germanico, attributed to Händel, that he recorded with Il Rossignolo in 2011 for Sony Classical. The critical acclaim won by this recording launched further collaboration between Tenerani (with Il Rossignolo) and Sony Classical with the recording of the complete solo sonatas by Georg Friedrich Händel (released in August 2019) and other music from the unedited sacred and secular Italian repertoires.

== Teaching ==
Ottaviano Tenerani is professor of historical keyboard, chamber music and curator of the collection of musical instruments at the Accademia Internazionale d’Organo e Musica Antica Giuseppe Gherardeschi in Pistoia and teach in several master classes and academies. Since 2023 he has been professor of the Master's Degree in chamber music and of the courses in musical improvisation and basso continuo at the Luigi Boccherini Conservatory in Lucca.

== Discography (selective) ==
- Georg Friedrich Händel, Complete solo sonatas, Il Rossignolo, SONY - DHM
- Georg Philipp Telemann, Telemann virtuoso, Il Rossignolo, Brilliant Classics
- Georg Friedrich Händel, Germanico, Il Rossignolo, SONY - DHM
- Giovanni Battista Sammartini, Notturni a quattro, Il Rossignolo, Brilliant Classic - Tactus
- Antonio Vivaldi, I concerti per violino et organo obligato / Sonate per flauto diritto, Il Rossignolo, Tactus
- Benedetto Marcello, Sonate per flauto e basso op 2 / Opere per clavicembalo, Il Rossignolo, Tactus
- AAVV, Le sonate per flauto diritto, flauto traverso e basso, Il Rossignolo, Orfeo
- Alessandro Scarlatti, Concerti e Sinfonie, Il Rossignolo, CPO
- Giovanni Battista Martini, Sinfonie a quattro, Il Rossignolo, Tactus
- Giovanni Battista Martini, Sei Sonate per l’organo e il cembalo, Tactus
- Orazio Caccini, Madrigali et Canzonette a cinque voci, Il Rossignolo, EMA
- Francesco Maria Veracini, Violin Sonatas, Musica Antiqua Roma, SONY - DHM

== Critical editions and Essays ==
- Mozart gioca a dadi, musica e calcolo combinatorio nel XVIII secolo. Sergio Giudici e Ottaviano Tenerani. In "Musica, Scienza e Linguaggio” - Polifonica - ETS - Pisa, 2022
- Il temperamento: una questione musicale, scientifica e didattica. Sergio Giudici e Ottaviano Tenerani. In "Musica, Scienza e Linguaggio” - Polifonica - ETS - Pisa, 2022
- Lo spinettone firmato Giovanni Ferrini dell'Accademia Internazionale Giuseppe Gherardeschi di Pistoia, in "Il cembalo a martelli da Bartolomeo Cristofori a Giovanni Ferrini - Pendragon, Bologna, 2019
- Charles Antoine Campion, L'Etruria fortunata - Hollitzer Wissenschaftsverlag, Wien, 2013
- Una serata in Camerata - Hollitzer Wissenschaftsverlag, Wien, 2013
- Georg Friedrich Händel (attr.), Germanico - Edizioni Il Rossignolo, Montopoli 2010
- Giovanni Battista Sammartini, 7 Notturni a quattro - Armelin Musica, Padova, 2009
- Johann Joachim Quantz, 7 Triosonate per Flauto, Violino e Basso Continuo (Flauto e Clavicembalo) - Ut Orpheus, Bologna, 2002
- Oratio Caccini Romano, Madrigali et canzonette a cinque voci, a cura di: Ottaviano Tenerani e Marica Testi, San Miniato, 1998.
