= Saint-Germain =

Saint-Germain, Saint Germain or Saint Germaine may refer to:

== Places ==
- Boulevard Saint-Germain
- List of French communes named Saint-Germain
- Saint-Germain, Belgium
- Saint-Germain, Quebec, Canada
- Saint-Germain River, Quebec, Canada
- St. Germain, Wisconsin, U.S.
- St. Germain (community), Wisconsin

== People ==
- Alicia St. Germaine, American politician from Michigan
- Antoine-Louis Decrest de Saint-Germain (1761–1835), French Count and general
- Christopher St. Germain (1460–1540), English legal writer
- Claude Louis, Comte de Saint-Germain (1707–1778), French general
- Count of St. Germain (c. 1691 or 1712 – 1784), European adventurer and scientist
  - St. Germain (Theosophy), a legendary spiritual master, identified with Count of St. Germain
  - Jacques St. Germain, a legendary vampire of New Orleans folklore, identified with Count of St. Germain
- Fernand St. Germain (1928–2014), American politician
- Germain of Paris (496–576), bishop and saint
- Germaine Cousin (1579–1601), French saint
- Germanus of Auxerre (c. 378–448) (Saint Germain l'Auxerrois), bishop and saint
- Gerry St. Germain (born 1937), Canadian politician
- Henri de Saint Germain (1878–1951), French fencer
- Karen St. Germain (born c. 1957), American politician; see Louisiana Center for Women in Government and Business Hall of Fame, 2017
- Kip St. Germaine (born 1965), American ice sledge hockey player
- Laurence St. Germain (born 1994), Canadian ski racer
- Ludwig-Friedrich Bonnet de Saint-Germain (1670–1761), Swiss scholar and politician
- Mark St. Germain, (born ca. 1954) American playwright, author, and film and television writer.
- Nikarson Saint-Germain (born 1978), known as Alibi Montana, French rapper
- Noël Saint-Germain (1922–1998), Canadian politician
- Omer St. Germain (1877–1949), Canadian lawyer and politician
- Pierre St. Germain (c. 1790–c.1870), Métis fur trader
- Ralph St. Germain (1904–1974), Canadian ice hockey player
- Ray St. Germain (1940-2024), Canadian musician and author
- Raymonde Saint-Germain (born 1951), Canadian public servant
- Ron Saint Germain, (born ca. 1946), American record producer
- Saint-Germain (actor) (François Victor Arthur Gilles de Saint-Germain, 1832–1899), French actor
- Sheryl St. Germain (born 1954), American writer professor
- St Germain (musician) Ludovic Navarre, (born 1969), French musician
- Tabitha St. Germain (fl. from 1985), Canadian actress
- Ted St. Germaine (1885–1947), American football player
- Val St. Germain (born 1971), Canadian football player

== Arts and entertainment ==
=== Fictional characters ===
- Count of St. Germain in The Secrets of the Immortal Nicholas Flamel series
- Count Saint-Germain, a character in novels by Chelsea Quinn Yarbro
- Maya St. Germain, in the Pretty Little Liars book series
- Saint-Germain, in Symphogear
- Serena St. Germaine, in James Bond 007: Everything or Nothing
- Count Saint-Germain (Dandadan), in Dandadan
- Saint Germain, a character in the video game Castlevania: Curse of Darkness, who was adapted into a recurring character in the Castlevania animated TV series

=== Other uses in arts and entertainment ===
- Saint Germaine (comics), by Gary Reed
- St Germain (album), by French house musician Ludovic Navarre as St Germain, 2015
- St. Germaine mystery book series by classical musician Mark Schweizer

== Other uses ==
- MV Saint Germain, the name of several French ships
- Saint Germain Bakery, a Canadian brand of Fairchild Group
- Saint Germain Foundation, an American religious organization
- Saint Germain HC, a French hockey club
- St-Germain (liqueur), an elderflower liqueur
- St. Germain High School, in Bangalore, India

== See also ==
- Germanus (disambiguation)
- Germain (disambiguation)
- Paris Saint-Germain F.C., a French football club
