= Germain =

Germain may refer to:

- Germain (name), including a list of people with the name
- Germain Arena, the former name of an arena in Estero, Florida
- Germain Racing, a NASCAR racing team
- Germain Amphitheater, a concert venue in Columbus, Ohio
- Paris Saint-Germain F.C., a football club based in Paris, France.
- Ateliers Germain, a pioneer Belgian carmaker
- MV Germain, the former French train ferry Saint Germain renamed for her voyage to India for scrapping

== See also ==
- Goermans, a harpsichord-making family
- Saint-Germain (disambiguation)
- Germanus (disambiguation)
- Germane
- Germaine (disambiguation)
