= Éghezée =

Municipality in Wallonia, Belgium

Éghezée Inguezêye (Walloon)
- Municipality
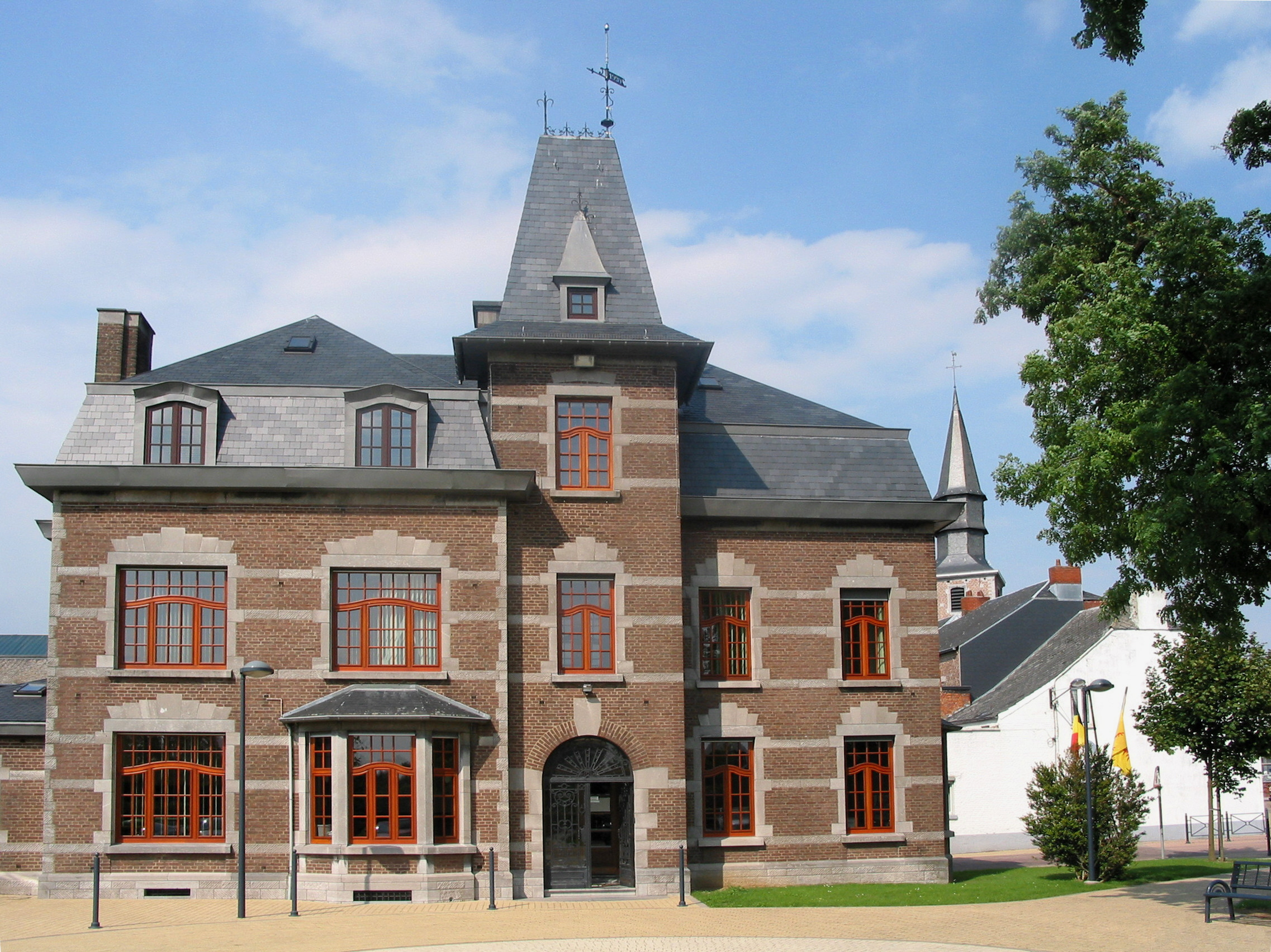
- Éghezée Town Hall

- Location of Éghezée in Namur Province
- Interactive map of Éghezée
- Location in Belgium
- Coordinates: 50°35′N 04°55′E
- Country: Belgium
- Community: French Community
- Region: Wallonia
- Province: Namur
- Arrondissement: Namur

Government
  - Mayor: Rudy Delhaise
  - Governing party: Ensemble Pour Vous

Area
  - Total: 103.22 km^{2} (39.85 sq mi)

Population (2018-01-01)
  - Total: 16,247
  - Density: 157.40/km^{2} (407.67/sq mi)
- Postal codes: 5310
- NIS code: 92035
- Area codes: 081
- Website: www.eghezee.be

Éghezée (French: [e.ɡə.ze]; Walloon: Inguezêye) is a municipality of Wallonia located in the province of Namur, Belgium.

On 1 January 2010 the municipality had 15,169 inhabitants. The total area is 102.81 km^{2}, giving a population density of 146.93 inhabitants per km^{2}.

The municipality consists of the following districts: Aische-en-Refail, Bolinne, Boneffe, Branchon, Dhuy, Éghezée, Hanret, Leuze, Liernu, Longchamps, Mehaigne, Noville-sur-Mehaigne, Saint-Germain, Taviers, Upigny, and Waret-la-Chaussée.

== See also ==
- List of protected heritage sites in Eghezée
