= Rens van der Wacht =

Dutch footballer

Personal information
- Date of birth: 1 June 1999 (age 27)
- Place of birth: Zaandam, Netherlands
- Height: 1.82 m (6 ft 0 in)
- Position: Midfielder

Senior career*
Years	Team	Apps	(Gls)
2019–2021	Jong AZ	2	(0)

International career
2015	Netherlands U16	1	(0)
2015	Netherlands U17	2	(0)
2019	Netherlands U19	2	(0)
- * Club domestic league appearances and goals as of 20 February 2021

Rens van der Wacht (born 1 June 1999) is a Dutch professional footballer who plays as a midfielder.

== Club career ==
Van der Wacht made his professional debut with Jong AZ in a 2–1 Eerste Divisie tie with Almere City FC on 20 September 2019. Van der Wacht's early career was impacted by injuries, as he spent almost 2 years out due to a knee infection and a hernia.
