= Jos van Manen Pieters =

Dutch writer (1930–2015)

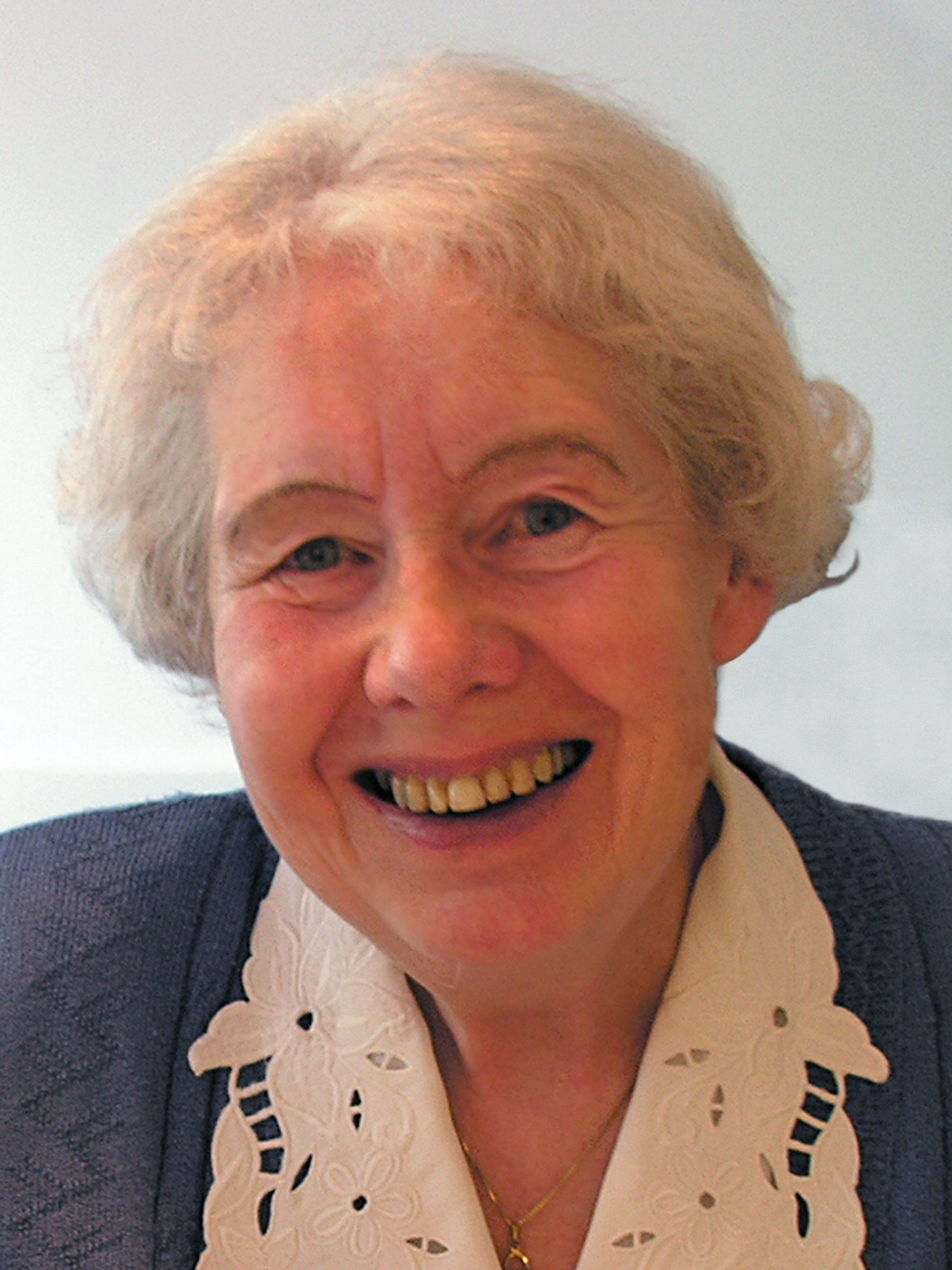
Jos van Manen Pieters

Jos van Manen Pieters (Dutch pronunciation: [ˈjɔs fɑ ˈmaːnə(m) ˈpitərs]; 21 March 1930 in Zaandam – 1 February 2015 in Ede) was a Dutch writer. She won the Athos Award in 1965.

== Life ==
She wrote about thirty books, in which she did not shy away from sensitive subjects such as incest. Her successful novel series Tuinfluitertrilogie appeared from 1955 and it has been reprinted several times.

== Books ==
- En de tuinfluiter zingt
- Roepend in de wind
- Gods geheimschrift
- Tocht zonder thuisreis
- Een nest vol tuinfluiters
- Rosemarie
- Er gebeurt geen wonder
- Als de tuinfluiter zwijgt
- Dat lieve, gevaarlijke leven
- Dit is mijn haven
- Vergeet het maar
- Tot overmaat van geluk
- Liefde incognito
- Geef mij een teken van leven
- Dromen sterven niet
- Alleen van horen zeggen
- Soms krijgt geluk een nieuw gezicht
- Een pad door de wildernis
- Voetsporen op het water
- De troostvogel
- Elke woestijn heeft zijn bron
- Langs groene oevers van hoop
- Een mens die aan jouw kant staat
- Een scheepje van papier
- De verrekijker
- Als een blad in de storm
- Ten leven opgeschreven
- Vluchtstrook
- Scharnier in de tijd
- Ogen van de overzij
