= Hanret =

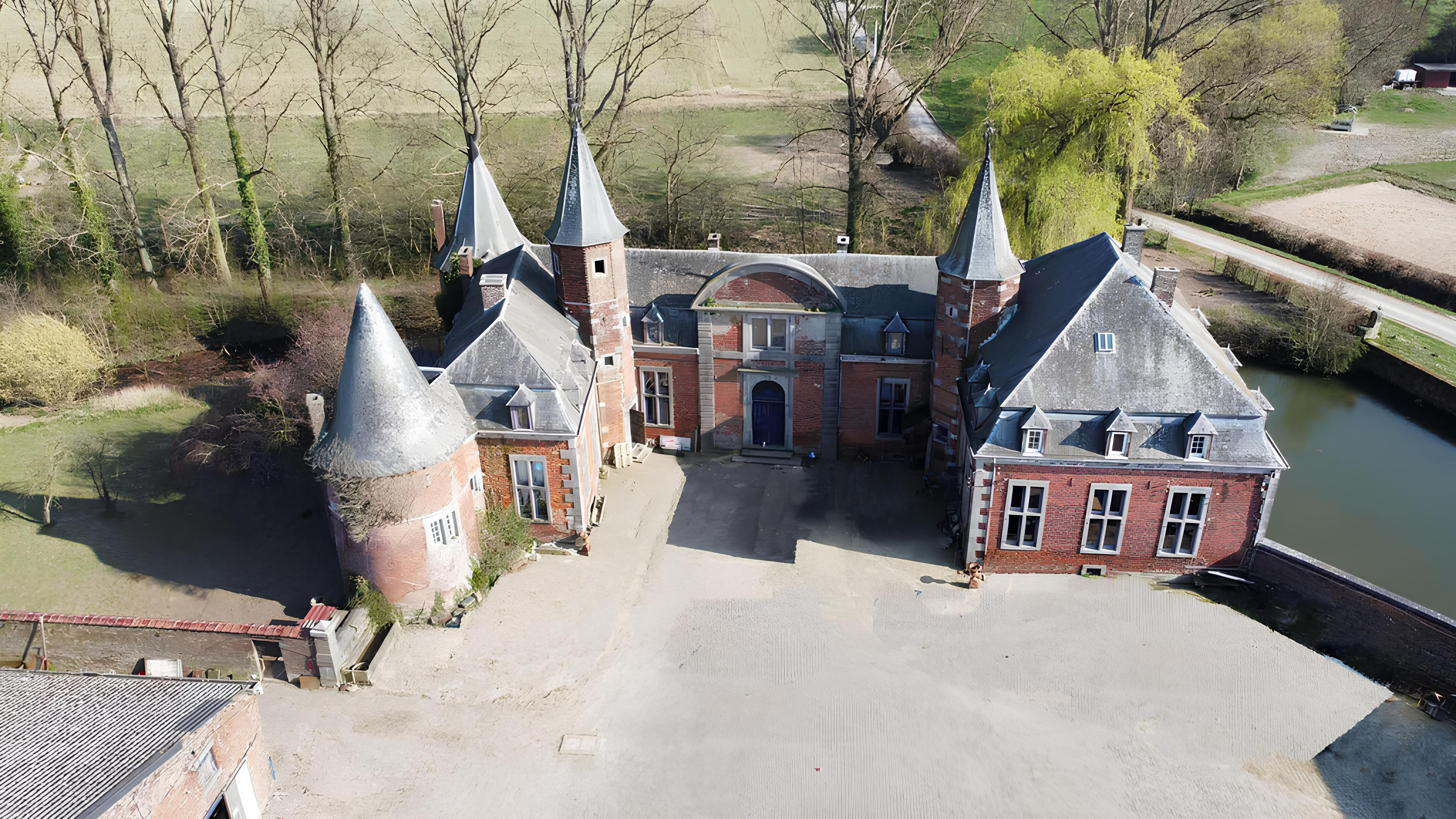
- Hanret, Montigny Castle

- Location within Belgium Location within Europe
- Coordinates: 50°35′00″N 04°56′00″E
- Country: Belgium
- Region: Wallonia
- Province: Namur
- Municipality: Éghezée

Hanret is a district of the municipality of Éghezée, located in the province of Namur in Wallonia, Belgium.

Hanret is mentioned for the first time in written sources in 868–869, and was at the time part of the land belonging to Lobbes Abbey. The village was ravaged in 1429, during a conflict between the Prince-Bishopric of Liège and the County of Namur. It was burnt by French troops in 1689–1690, and was again on the frontlines between French and Imperial troops in 1695, when the village was pillaged.

The village church dates from the 18th century. Montigny Castle, a fortified estate of a type known as château-ferme, dates from the 17th century.
