= Houses on the Achterzaan =

1871 painting by Claude Monet

Coordinates: 52°26′24.4″N 4°49′26.7″E

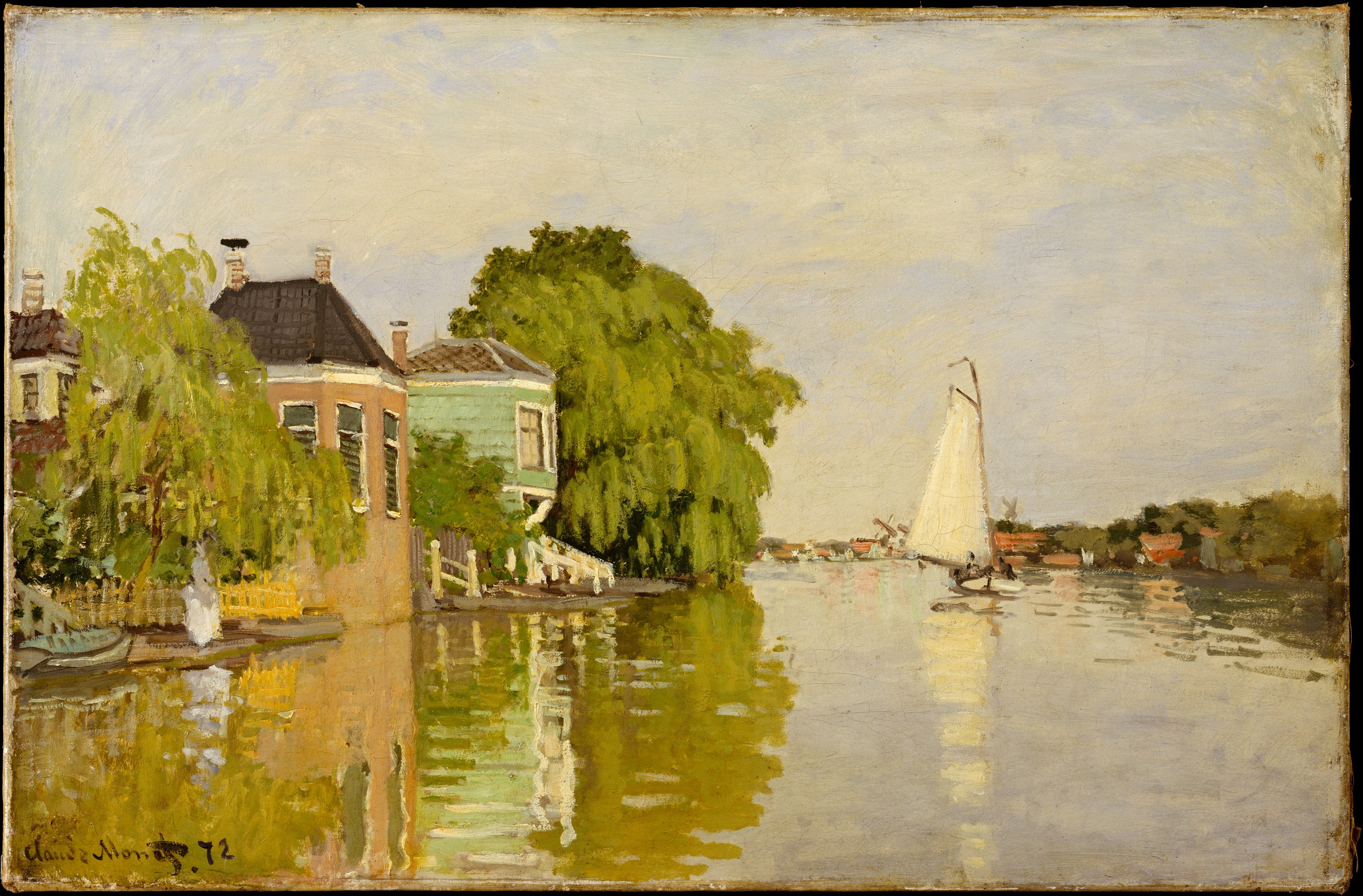
- Artist: Claude Monet
- Year: 1871
- Dimensions: 45.7 cm × 67 cm (18.0 in × 26 in)
- Location: Metropolitan Museum of Art; New York

Houses on the Achterzaan is an 1871 painting by French artist Claude Monet. Done in oil on canvas, the work depicts riverside garden houses on the west shore of the Achterzaan river in Zaandam, the Netherlands. He painted it from the dam in the Zaan, facing northwest. The painting is in the collection of the Metropolitan Museum of Art.

== Background ==
Monet traveled to the Netherlands on the advice of fellow painter Charles-François Daubigny, who highly recommended that Monet study the splendor of the Achterzaan river. The paintings Monet produced on his trip (often referred to as his Dutch landscapes), including Houses, were well received by his fellow impressionists.

== See also ==
- List of paintings by Claude Monet
