= Bolinne =

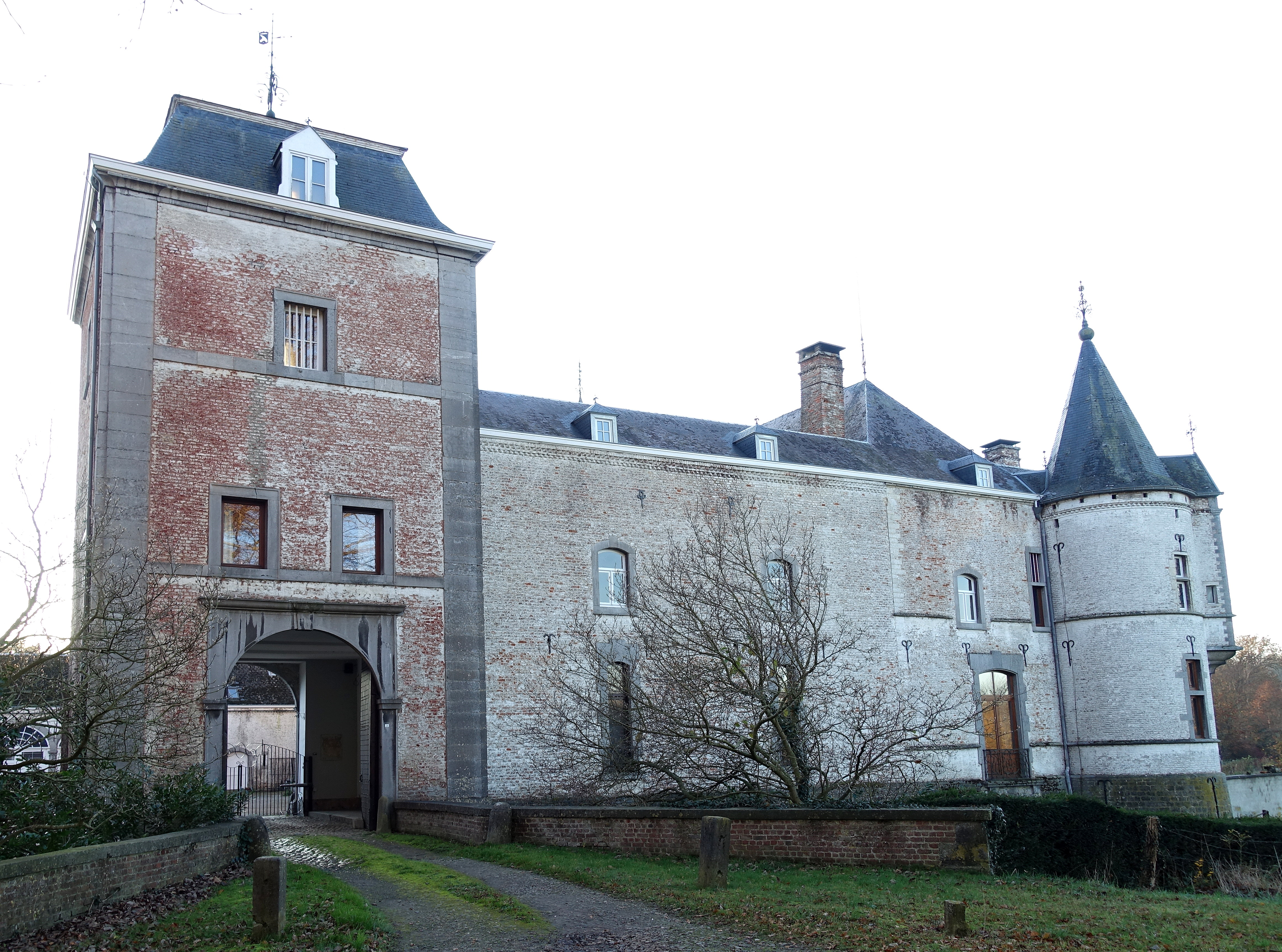
- Château de Bolinne-Harlue

- Location within Belgium Location within Europe
- Coordinates: 50°36′00″N 04°45′00″E
- Country: Belgium
- Region: Wallonia
- Province: Namur
- Municipality: Éghezée

Bolinne is a district of the municipality of Éghezée, located in the province of Namur in Wallonia, Belgium. It consists of the villages Bolinne and Harlue.

Both villages have been settled at least since the Middle Ages. Bolinne was subservient to the Collegiate Church of Saint Gertrude in Nivelles in the 11th century, and from the 14th to the County of Namur. Harlue was the seat of a feudal lord, since the 13th century under the County of Namur, and is unusual in that all the buildings associated with the feudal estate — castle, farm buildings, church and vicarage — are still preserved in their original layout in what is today a listed site (though the individual buildings are not all medieval).
