= Aische-en-Refail =

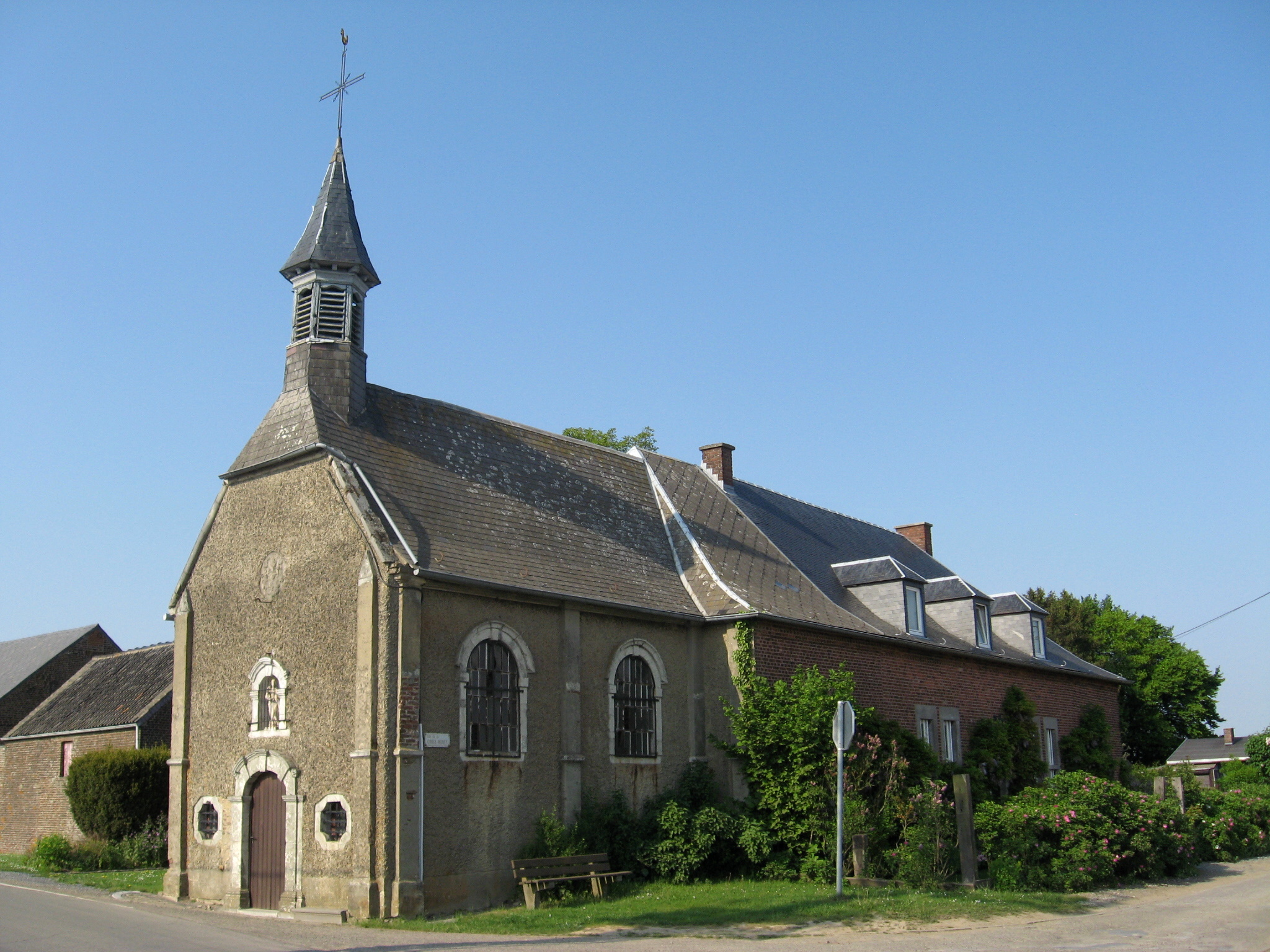
- Aische-en-Refail, Chapel of Croix-Monet

- Location within Belgium Location within Europe
- Coordinates: 50°35′58″N 04°50′08″E
- Country: Belgium
- Region: Wallonia
- Province: Namur
- Municipality: Éghezée

Aische-en-Refail is a district and village of the municipality of Éghezée, located in the province of Namur in Wallonia, Belgium.

Aische-en-Refail is located along the former Roman road connecting Bavay with Tongeren, and remains of a Roman settlement have been discovered in the village. The first written mention of Aische-en-Refail dates from 805. During the 14th century, the Count of Namur used to hunt wolves in the area. In 1855, a tenth of the population emigrated to Wisconsin. The village contains the ruins of a 12th-centuy castle (Château d'Aische), an 18th-century manor and a listed chapel from 1717, the Croix-Monet chapel, which was restored in 2006.
