= St Germans =

St Germans or St German's may refer to:

- St Germans, Cornwall, England
  - St Germans railway station
  - St German's Priory
  - St Germans River
  - St Germans Rural District, a local government division 1894–1974
  - St Germans (UK Parliament constituency) 1562–1832
- St German's Church, in Cardiff, Wales
- Bishop of St Germans, an episcopal title in England
- Earl of St Germans, a title in the Peerage of the United Kingdom

== See also ==
- Saint-Germain (disambiguation)
- Peel Cathedral, the Cathedral Church of Saint German, Isle of Man
- Wiggenhall St Germans, in Norfolk, England
