= Mehaigne (district) =

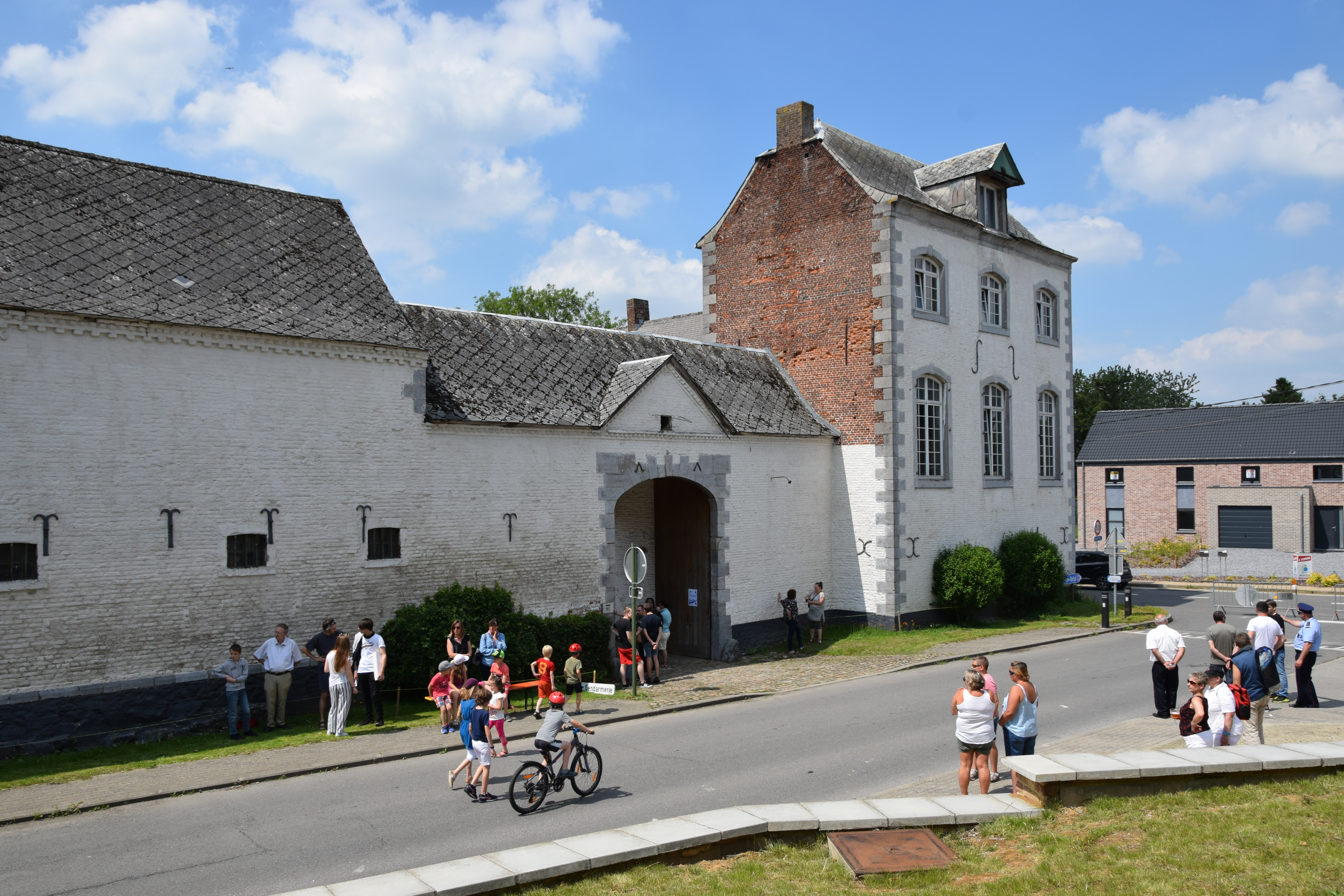
- Mehaigne

- Location within Belgium Location within Europe
- Coordinates: 50°35′00″N 04°52′00″E
- Country: Belgium
- Region: Wallonia
- Province: Namur
- Municipality: Éghezée

Mehaigne is a district and village of the municipality of Éghezée, located in the province of Namur in Wallonia, Belgium.

Mehaigne is named after the river Mehaigne, by which it is located. The history of the village goes back to at least the Middle Ages. During the religious wars of 17th century Mehaigne was pillaged by Spanish and French troops. Several historical buildings are preserved in the village.
