= Taviers =

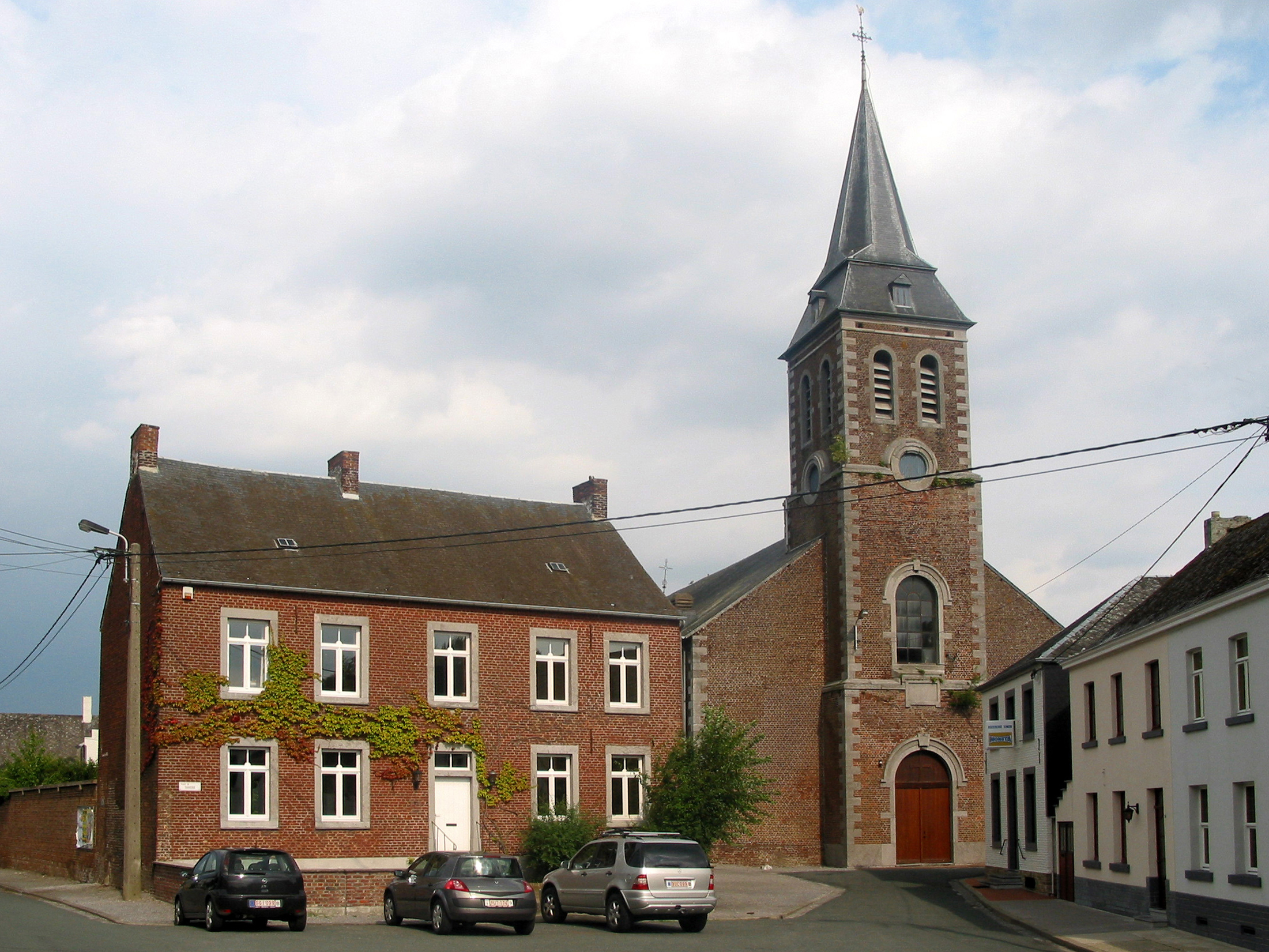
- Taviers

- Location within Belgium Location within Europe
- Coordinates: 50°37′00″N 04°55′00″E
- Country: Belgium
- Region: Wallonia
- Province: Namur
- Municipality: Éghezée

Taviers is a village and district of the municipality of Éghezée, located in the province of Namur in Wallonia, Belgium.

The name derives from the Latin word taberna, "tavern". The Roman road between Bavay and Tongeren passed here, and archaeologists have discovered the remains of what was probably a tavern or inn. In the Middle Ages, the village was passed from the County of Flanders to the Abbey of Saint-Hubert in 1070. In the 16th century it became the property of the d'Yve family. The village contains several historical farm houses, dating from the 17th century and onwards.
