= Liernu =

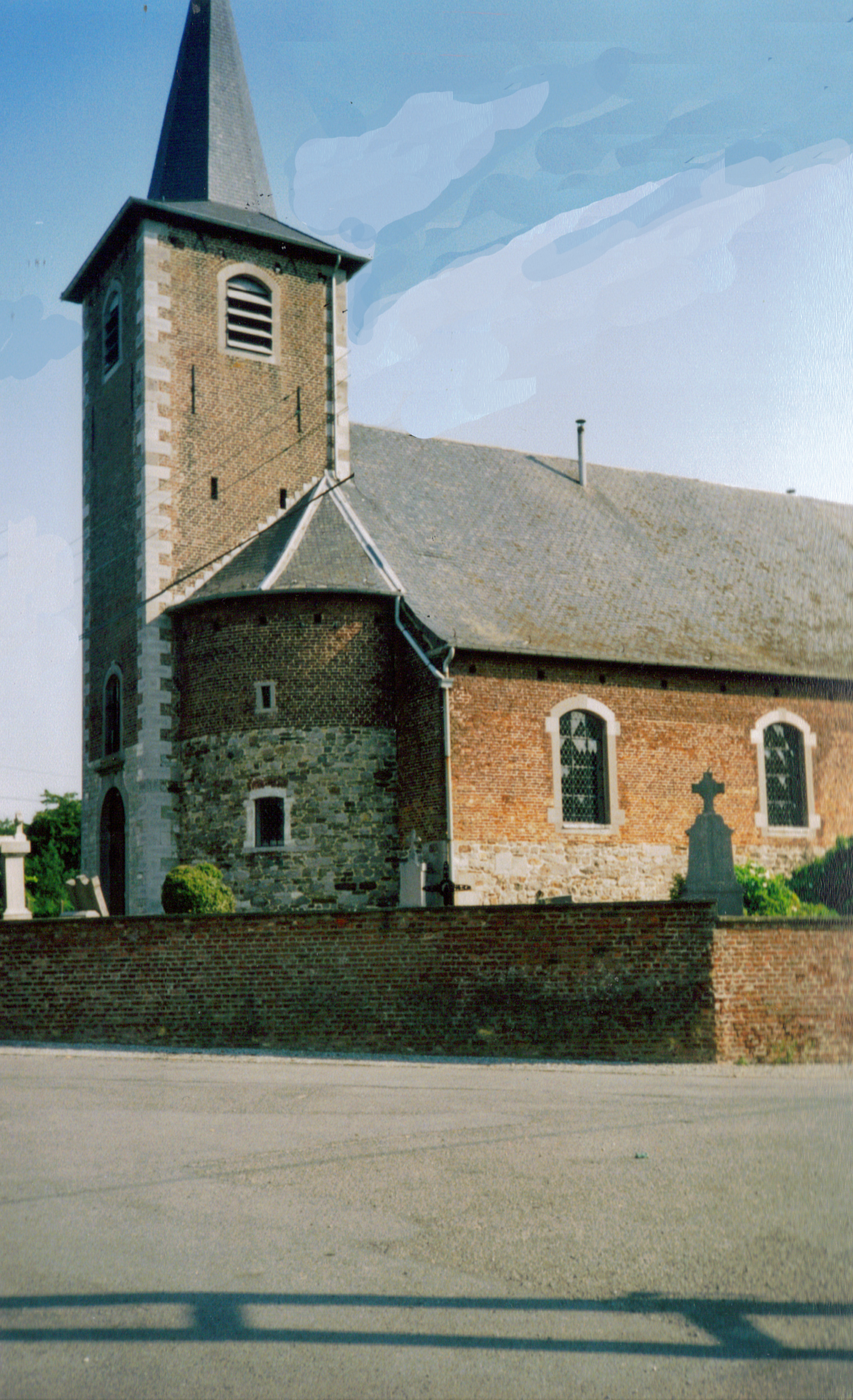
Church of Liernu

Liernu (French pronunciation: [ljɛʁny]) is a village of Wallonia and a district of the municipality of Éghezée, located in the province of Namur, Belgium.

Liernu is best known for its centuries old Big Oak Tree (50°35′03″N 4°49′40″E), one of the largest and oldest in continental Europe. The tree took part in the "European Tree of the Year" competition in 2016 as a representative of Belgium.

Liernu had 806 inhabitants as of March 2006, and extends over 625 hectares (1,540 acres).

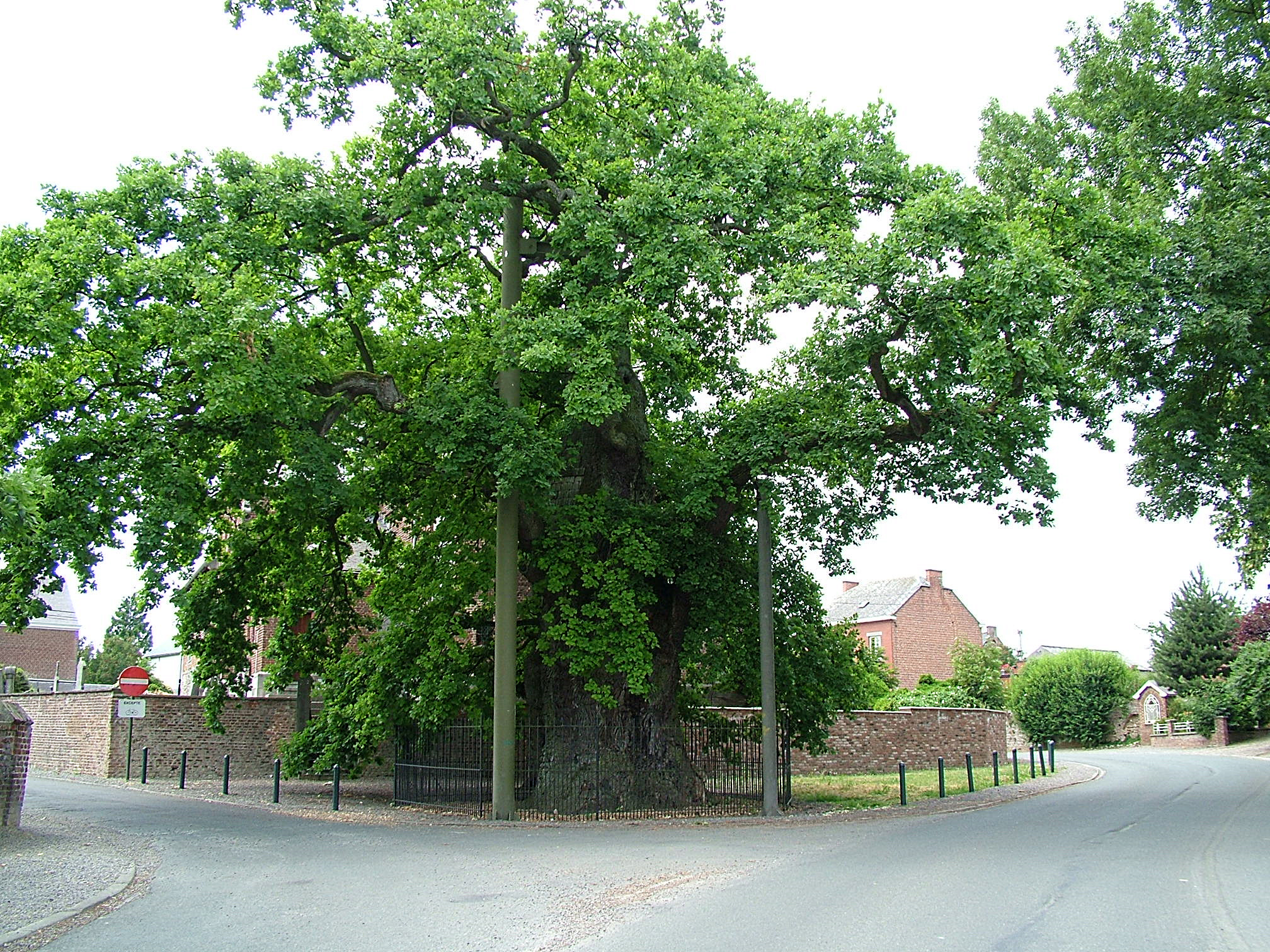

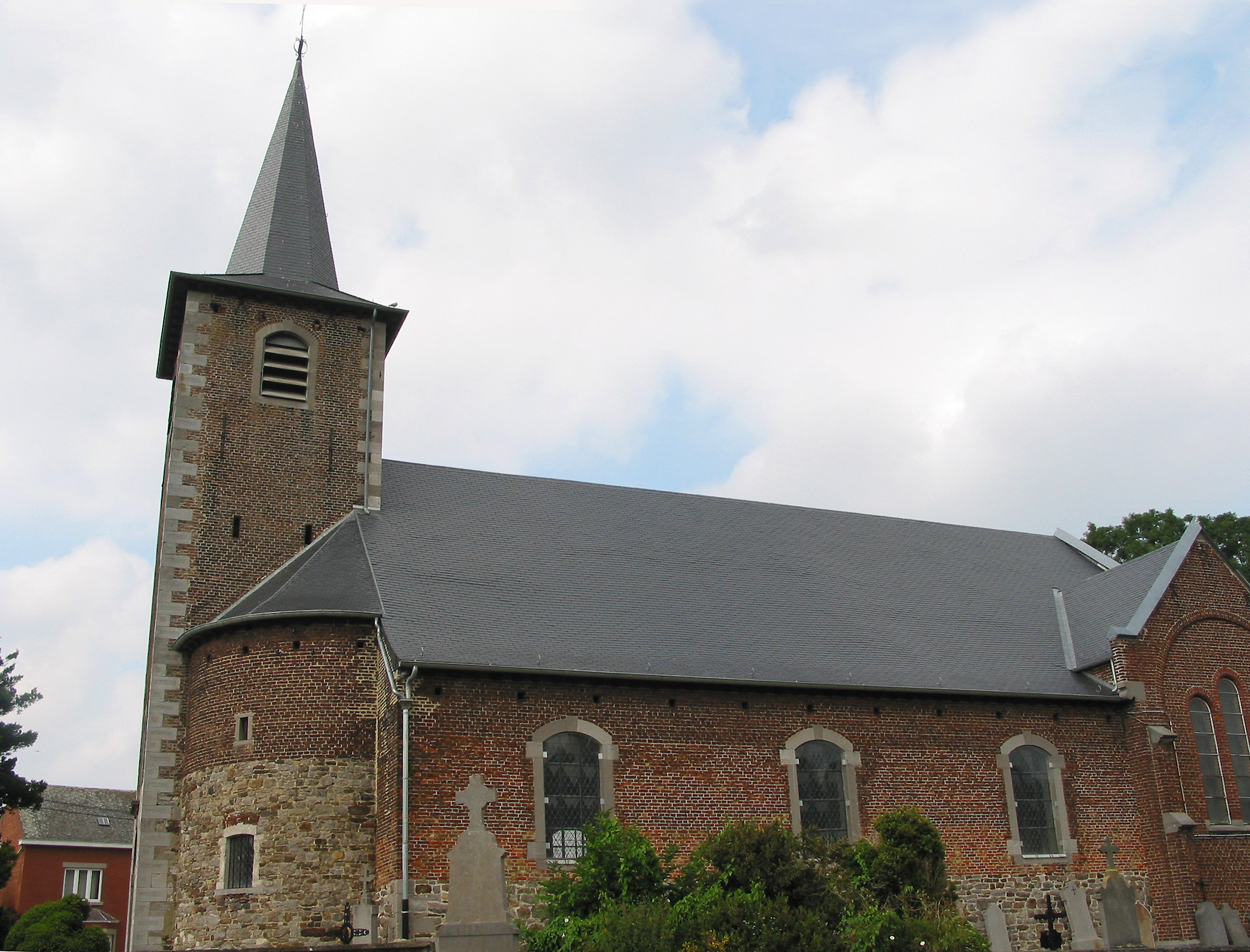

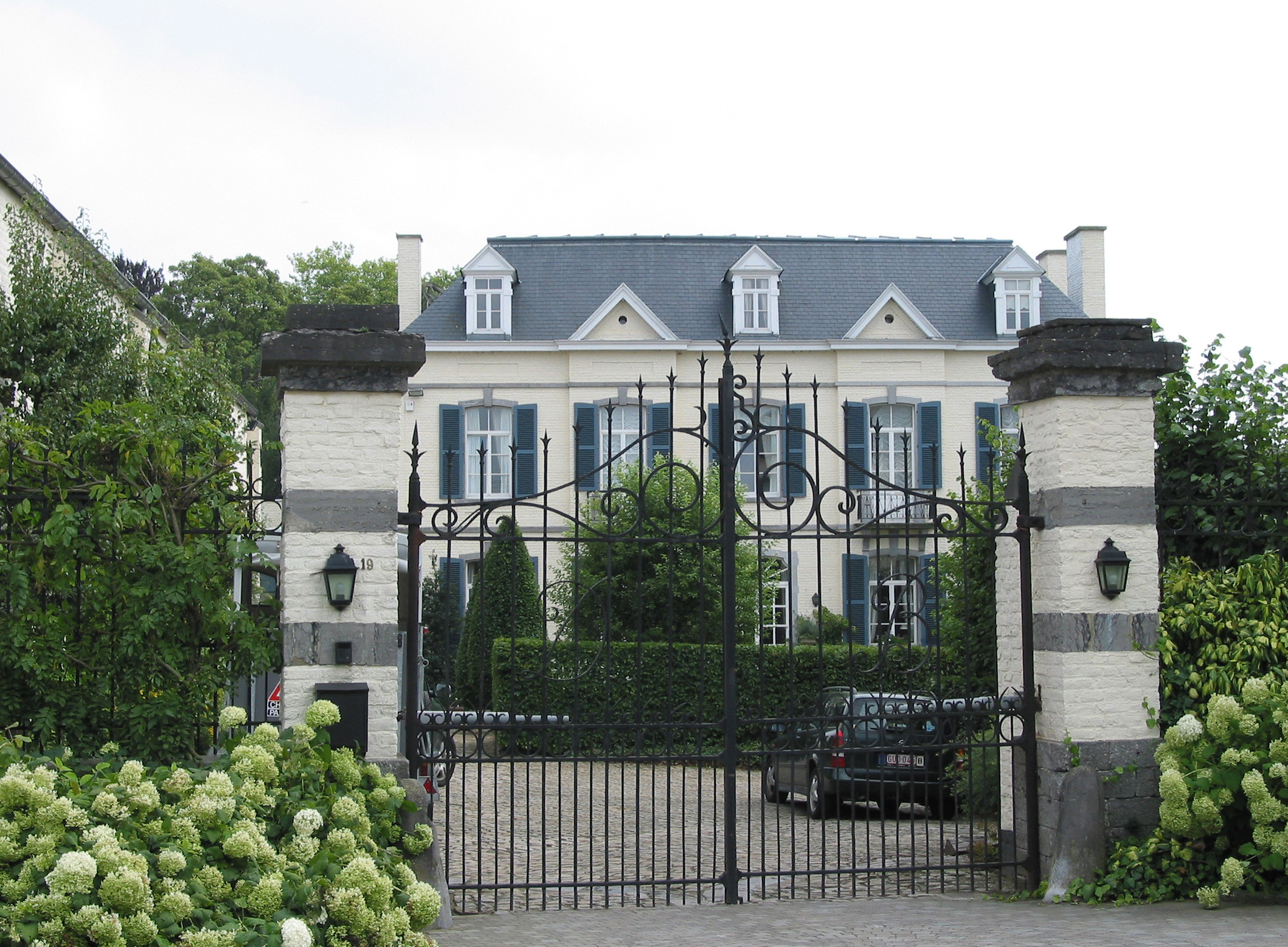

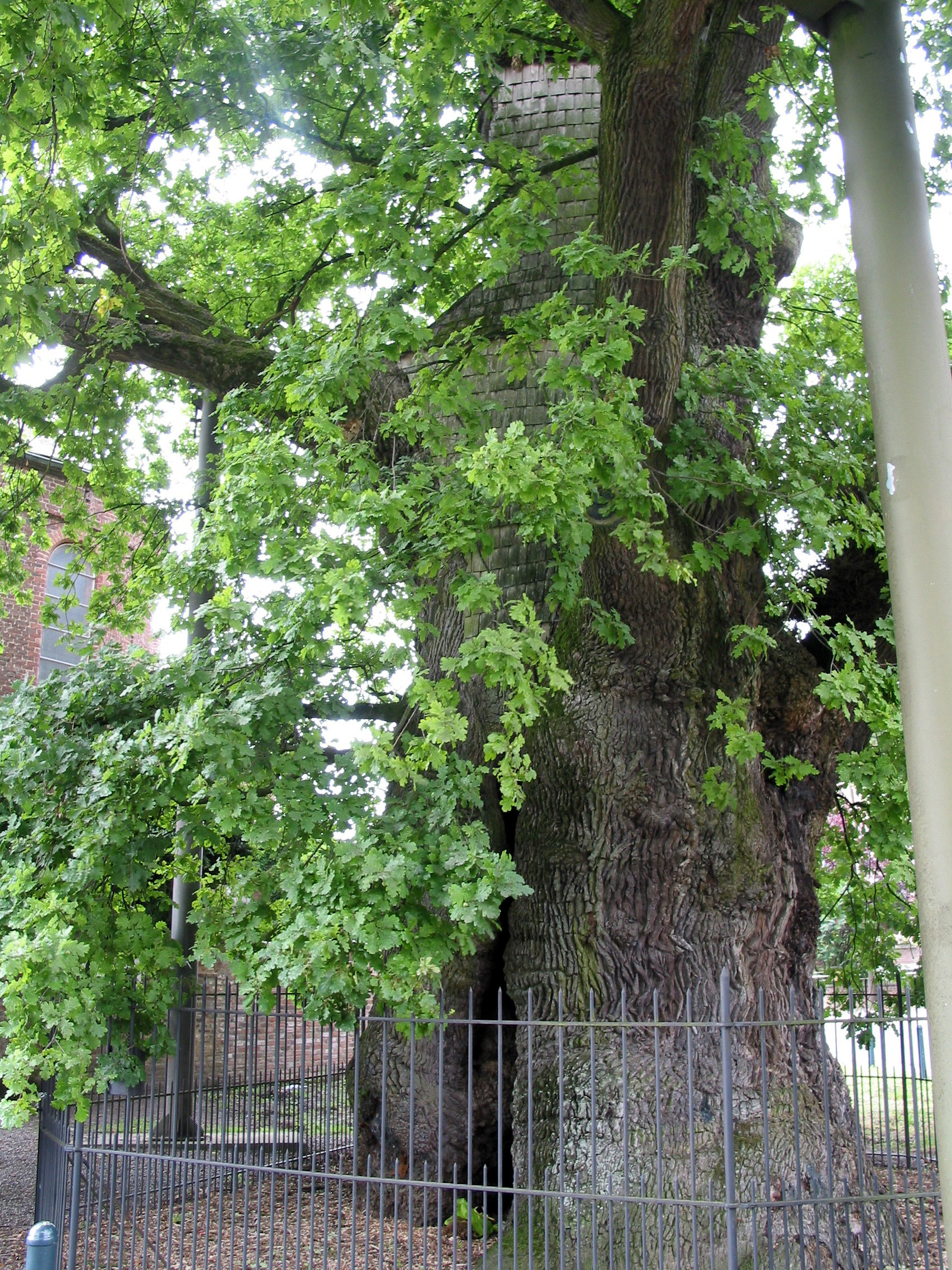

== See also ==
- List of individual trees
