= List of protected heritage sites in Éghezée =

This table shows an overview of the protected heritage sites in the Walloon town Éghezée. This list is part of Belgium's national heritage.

Object	Year/architect	Town/section	Address	Coordinates	Number^{?}	Image
Combination of the castle, the farm and surrounding land in Aische-and-Refail ^{(nl)} ^{(fr)}		Éghezée		50.596156°N 4.824696°E	92035-CLT-0001-01 Info	Combinatie van het kasteel, de boerderij en de omliggende grond in Aische-en-Refail
The church of St. Martin in Harlue (M) and the group formed by the church, the rectory, the castle, the avenue of trees of the bridge over the creek "The Mark" at the entrance of the church and the castle and the surrounding land ^{(nl)} ^{(fr)}		Éghezée		50.608471°N 4.913422°E	92035-CLT-0002-01 Info	De kerk van St. Martin in Harlue (M) en de groep gevormd door de kerk, de pastorie, het kasteel, de laan van bomen die van de brug over de kreek "De Mark" aan de ingang van de kerk en het kasteel en het omringende land
The old oak tree Liernu ^{(nl)} ^{(fr)}		Éghezée		50.584123°N 4.827681°E	92035-CLT-0003-01 Info	De oude eik Liernu
The tower and nave of the church of Saint-Germain (M) and totality of the church, the cemetery and the surrounding wall (S) ^{(nl)} ^{(fr)}		Éghezée		50.572890°N 4.843436°E	92035-CLT-0004-01 Info	De toren en het schip van de kerk van Saint-Germain (M) en alle-gevormd door de genoemde kerk, de begraafplaats en de omliggende muur (S)
The façades and roofs of the farm and the paving of the courtyard of the farm Monceau Mehaigne (M) and the group formed by the building and surrounding land ^{(nl)} ^{(fr)}		Éghezée		50.591287°N 4.867370°E	92035-CLT-0006-01 Info	De gevels en daken van de boerderij en de bestrating van de binnenplaats van de boerderij Monceau Mehaigne (M) en de groep wordt gevormd door het gebouw en de omliggende land
The whole chapel of the Croix-Monet and the façades and roofs of the house of the chaplain (M) and the ensemble formed by the two buildings and surrounding grounds (S)-and-Aische Refail ^{(nl)} ^{(fr)}		Éghezée		50.592509°N 4.830339°E	92035-CLT-0007-01 Info	De hele kapel van het Croix-Monet en de gevels en daken van het huis van de kapelaan (M) en de montage gevormd door de twee gebouwen en de omliggende gronden (S)-en-Aische Refail
The ruins of the castle Aische-en-Refail and the farm adjoining the barn in its entirety with the structure, walls and roofs of all buildings on the farm, the old tower of the castle, the surrounding walls, the sides of the castle walls and the access bridge and finally the pair of pillars that mark the entrance, walls and roofs of the small building (a former bakery or smith), which stands on the left front of main gate ^{(nl)} ^{(fr)}		Éghezée		50.596594°N 4.829286°E	92035-CLT-0008-01 Info	
The whole barn located on the rue du Gros Chêne, No 1 Liernu (M) and the group formed by her and the surrounding land ^{(nl)} ^{(fr)}		Éghezée		50.583437°N 4.828751°E	92035-CLT-0010-01 Info	De hele schuur gelegen aan de rue du Gros Chêne, nr. 1 tot Liernu (M) en de groep gevormd door haar en het omliggende land
The façades and roofs of the buildings and the portico of the farmhouse dating from 1806 on the Rue de la Gare, No 21 ^{(nl)} ^{(fr)}		Éghezée		50.617779°N 4.929262°E	92035-CLT-0011-01 Info	De gevels en daken van de gebouwen als het voorhuis van de boerderij van 1806 aan de Rue de la Gare, nr. 21
The façades and roofs of the chapel of St. Peter Franquenée ^{(nl)} ^{(fr)}		Taviers Éghezée		50.620614°N 4.942593°E	92035-CLT-0014-01 Info	De gevels en daken van de kapel St. Peter Franquenée
The old oak tree Liernu ^{(nl)} ^{(fr)}		Éghezée		50.584123°N 4.827681°E	92035-PEX-0001-01 Info	De oude eik Liernu

== See also ==
- List of protected heritage sites in Namur (province)
- Éghezée
