= Eirenarch =

Legal position in the Roman Empire

Eirenarch was a position in the Roman Empire similar to a sheriff. An eirenarch was responsible for the local enforcement of laws.
