= Germaine Levant =

Dutch footballer (born 1978)

Germaine Levant (born 14 December 1978 in Zaandam) is a Dutch footballer who played for Eerste Divisie club Stormvogels Telstar during the 1999–2003 football season.
