= San Germano =

San Germano may refer to:

- San Germano Chisone, a municipality in the Province of Turin in Piedmont
- San Germano dei Berici, a municipality in the Province of Vicenza in the Veneto
- San Germano Vercellese, a municipality in the Province of Vercelli in Piedmont
- Cassino or San Germano, a district in the Province of Frosinone in Lazio, known for its abbey and the World War II Battle of Monte Cassino
- San Germano, a district of the commune of Casale Monferrato in the Province of Alessandria in Piedmont
