= Saint-Germain, Belgium =

Saint-Germain
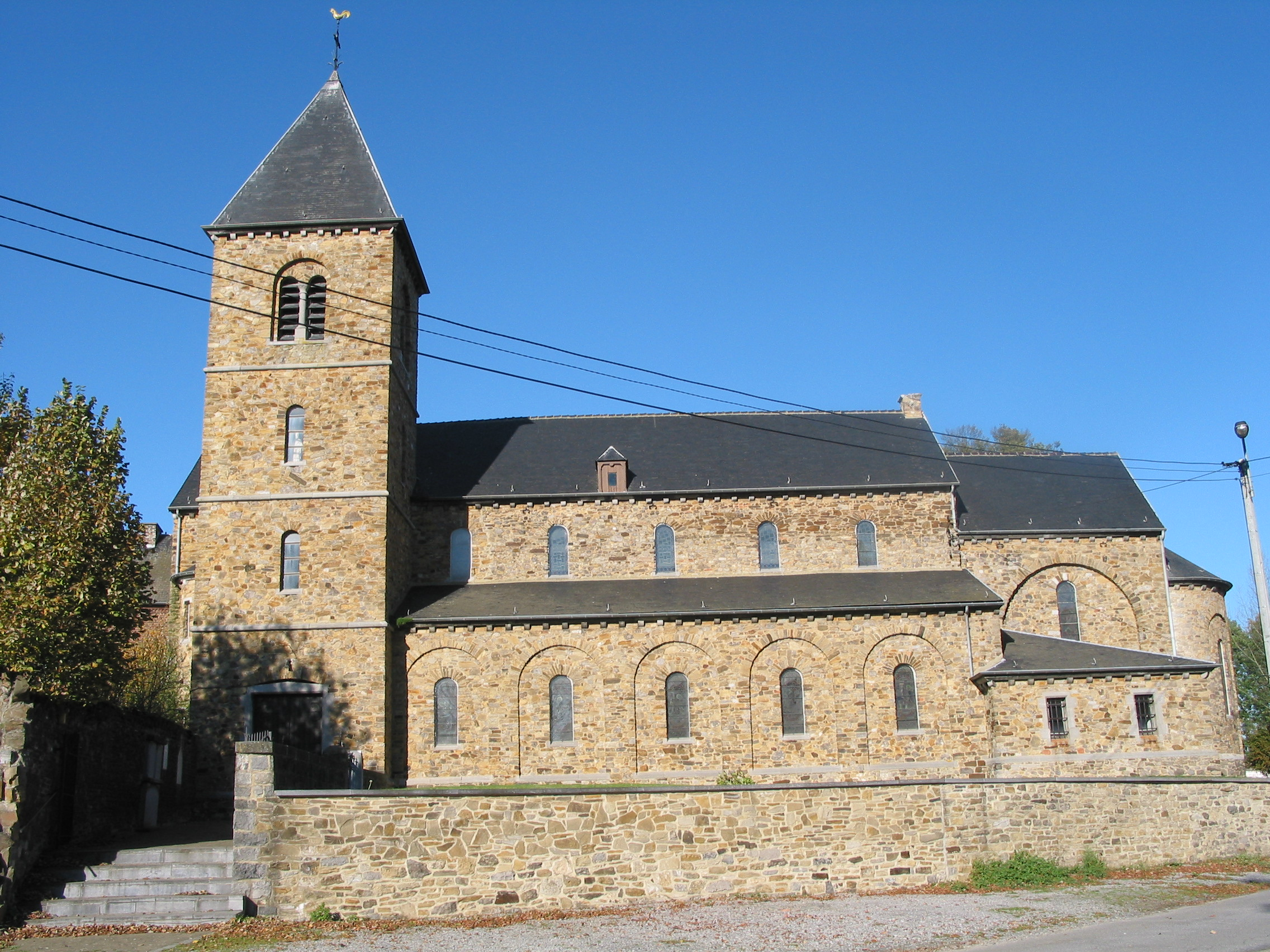
- Village church of Saint-Germain, oldest part from the 12th century

- Location within Belgium Location within Europe
- Coordinates: 50°34′01″N 04°49′48″E
- Country: Belgium
- Region: Wallonia
- Province: Namur
- Municipality: Éghezée

Saint-Germain is a district and village of the municipality of Éghezée, located in the province of Namur in Wallonia, Belgium.

According to legend, the village was founded by Saint Germanus of Auxerre when he passed here in 477. It is not impossible that the village dates to the 5th century; some place names in the area can be etymologically connected with the Late Roman period. The present village church dates from the 12th century, but was heavily rebuilt in a Neo-Romanesque style in 1902. The village suffered during the wars of the 17th and 18th centuries.
