= Germanus =

Germanus or Germanos (from Latin and Greek forms respectively) may refer to:

== People ==
- Lucius Trebius Germanus, governor of Roman Britain around 126
- Germanus (died c. 290), possibly apocryphal martyr-saint tortured at the Pula Arena
- Germanus (d. 305 AD), Spanish martyr-saint (see Servandus and Cermanus)
- Germanus of Auxerre (378–448), bishop of Auxerre who founded the Carolingian abbey of Saint-Germain en Auxerre named for the same saint
- Germanus of Man (410–475), saint
- Germain of Paris (Latin: Germanus; 496–576), bishop of Paris, Roman Catholic and Eastern Orthodox saint
- Germanus of Capua (died 541), archbishop from 519
- Germanus (cousin of Justinian I) (died 550), general of the Byzantine Empire
- Germanus (Caesar), son-in-law of Tiberius II Constantine
- Germanus (magister militum under Phocas) (died 604)
- Germanus (patricius) (died 605/606), leading senator in the reign of Emperor Maurice
- Germanus of Granfelden (612–675), saint
- Germanus I, Patriarch of Bulgaria (972–990)
- Germanus of Winchester (died c. 1013) English abbot
- Henricus Martellus Germanus, 15th-century cartographer
- Moses Germanus or Johann Peter Spaeth (died 1701), a German convert to Judaism
- Gyula Germanus (1884–1979), a Hungarian writer and islamologist

=== Greek clerics ===
- Saint Germanus (died c. 733), 39th Patriarch of Constantinople
- Germanus II of Constantinople (died 1240), 95th Patriarch of Constantinople
- Germanus III of Constantinople (died 1267), 101st Patriarch of Constantinople
- Germanos III of Old Patras (1771–1826), metropolitan bishop of Patras and participant in the Greek War of Independence
- Germanus IV of Constantinople (died 1853), 213th Patriarch of Constantinople
- Germanus II of Athens, Archbishop of Athens (1889–1896)
- Germanus V of Constantinople (died 1918), 225th Patriarch of Constantinople
- Germanos Karavangelis (died 1935), Metropolitan Bishop of Kastoria, Amaseia, Ioannina, and Exarch of Central Europe.

== Places ==
- Germanos or Germenos, the Byzantine name for the village of Soğukçam, Göynük in modern Turkey.
  - The Germanos inscription, a text in Old Phrygian found in this town.
- Agios Germanos, a village in Western Macedonia, Greece.

== Other uses ==
- Sanctus Germanus, a titular see in the Roman Catholic church
- Germanos Group, a Greek consumer electronics chain

== See also ==
- Germain (disambiguation)
- Germaine (disambiguation)
- German (disambiguation)
- Germán (disambiguation)
- Germania (disambiguation)
- Germanicus (disambiguation)
- Saint Germanus (disambiguation)
- Germanium, a chemical element with symbol Ge
