= Giuseppe Gherardeschi =

Italian composer

- Born: 3 November 1759; Pistoia
- Died: 6 August 1815 (aged 55); Pistoia
- Occupations: organist and composer

Giuseppe Gherardeschi (3 November 1759 - 6 August 1815) was an Italian organist and composer. He was born and died in Pistoia.

He began to study music with his father Domenico, who was the maestro di cappella at Pistoia Cathedral, and his uncle Filippo Maria Gherardeschi. He continued his studies with Nicola Sala in Naples at the Conservatorio della Pietà dei Turchini. On returning to his home city he was appointed organist at the Church of Santa Maria dell'Umiltà and later succeeded his father as director of music at Pistoia Cathedral.

As a composer he wrote vocal music (sacred and secular) as well as instrumental music (solo, chamber and orchestral).

== Works ==
=== Vocal music ===
==== Secular Music ====
- Daliso e Delmita (opera, 1782)
- Angelica e Medoro (cantata, 1783)
- L'apparenza inganna (opera, 1784)
- L'ombra di Catilina (cantata, 1789)
- L'impazienza (cantata, 1798)
- La speranza coronata (cantata, 1804–1809)
- Other arias, duest and choral works

==== Sacred Music ====
- Il sacrificio di Jeft (oratorio, 1803)
- 30 Masses
- 37 Lamentations
- 90 Motets
- 5 Te Deum
- Altri lavori sacri minori

=== Instrumental Music ===
- 6 sonatas for harpsichord or fortepiano and violin obbligato
- Several concertoni
- Quintet for wind instruments
- 7 symphonies
- 6 trios for 2 violins and violoncello (1784)
- 2 sonatas for harpsichord
- Numerous organ works
- Other minor works

=== Bibliography ===
- U. Pineschi - Giuseppe Gherardeschi di Pistoja: compositore, maestro di cappella e organista - Pistoia, 1999
- Giuseppe Gherardeschi, Le Opere per Organo, edited by Umberto Pineschi, Fondazione Accademia di Musica Italiana per Organo, 2009

== Discography ==
- Musica barocca italiana per organo, Giuseppe Gherardeschi - Rondo and Sonata per organo a giusa di banda militare che suona una marcia - Ton Koopman - Música CEV 196
- Tra Sacro e Profano: unpublished 18th century Italian works - Sonata per organo a giusa di banda militare che suona una marcia and Versetti per organo a pieno e concertati in tutti i toni – Claudio Brizi - Arts 475802
- Gargoyles and Chimeras: Exotic Works for Organ - Sonata per organo a giusa di banda militare che suona una marcia – David Britton – Delos DE3077
- Catherine Todorovski: All’Italiana - Versetti per organo a pieno e concertati in tutti i toni - Atma – ACD22110
- King of Instruments: A listener's guide to the art and science of recording the organ – March – David Britton – Delos DE3503
- Gherardeschi: Responsori e Requiem – Bongiovanni – GB2350
- Gherardeschi: Messa per organo - Luigi Ferdinando Tagliavini - fonè 93 F 22CD
