= Jermaine (disambiguation) =

Jermaine is a masculine given name.

It can also refer to:

- Jermaine (1972 album), an album by Jermaine Jackson
- Jermaine (1980 album), an album by the aforementioned artist
- "Jermaine" (Adventure Time), an episode of an animated series
