= Niels Heithuis =

Niels Heithuis (born 4 June 1972) is a Dutch journalist and radio presenter, best known for his sharp interview style, current affairs presentation, and investigative journalism. He currently co-hosts the evening drive-time show De Avondspits alongside Liesbeth Staats on the independent business news station BNR Nieuwsradio. Previously, he spent over a decade within public broadcasting, notably presenting the investigative flagship show Pointer on NPO Radio 1.

In 2008, Heithuis won the prestigious Marconi Award for best radio programme.

== Career ==
=== Early career (1990s–2010) ===
During the 1990s, Heithuis began his broadcasting career as a news reader for Sky Radio, reporter and presenter for the Dutch branch of Classic FM and the national news agency ANP. From 2000, he transitioned into investigative journalism, working as an investigative reporter for the public broadcaster VARA.

Later that decade, he joined BNR Nieuwsradio for his first tenure. During this period, he hosted the political weekend talk show De Lobby. As a live news reporter, he covered high-profile national and international events, including the murder of filmmaker Theo van Gogh, the trial of the Hofstad Network terrorist group, and the first anniversary of the Haiti earthquake. In 2007, he was appointed main presenter of the evening drive-time current affairs programme On the Move, which broadcast live from the United States during the 2008 presidential elections. His work on the show earned him the 2008 Marconi Award.

=== Public broadcasting and investigative highlights (2011–2025) ===
Following his first stint at BNR, Heithuis focused heavily on investigative reporting and public radio.

He became a prominent voice on NPO Radio 1, hosting Reporter Radio and its successor, the cross-media investigative journalism programme Pointer (KRO-NCRV). For Pointer, Heithuis participated in an international journalistic collaboration investigating human rights abuses at the external borders of the European Union. His individual reporting highlights also included coverage on the industrial pollution of the Wadden Sea World Heritage Site by FrieslandCampina, as well as systemic PFAS chemical contamination across the Netherlands.

Between 2014 and 2021, he also hosted the weekend breakfast show on classical music station NPO Radio 4.

Alongside his heavy news journalism, Heithuis co-created and hosted the popular cultural podcast Klassiek Inside on NPO Klassiek with pianist Jacobus den Herder. Patterned loosely after informal television sports talk shows, the programme reviewed classical music releases and mixed lighthearted industry news with serious investigations into institutional misconduct at music academies. Following funding cuts by the NPO in late 2025, the duo transitioned the show into an independent podcast under the title Klassiek Insight.

=== Return to BNR Nieuwsradio (2025–present) ===
In November 2025, Heithuis returned to BNR Nieuwsradio after nearly fifteen years. He was paired with Liesbeth Staats to helm the network's flagship drive-time news block, De Avondspits, airing Mondays through Thursdays.
