= MV Saint Germain =

A number of French motor vessels have been named Saint Germain, including:

- MV Saint Germain (1924), a cargo ship torpedoed and sunk in 1940
- MV Saint Germain (1951), a train ferry in service 1951–88
