= Germanicus Young Tigner =

American politician

Member of the Georgia House of Representatives from Georgia

Personal details
- Party: Democratic
- Occupation: Attorney

Germanicus Young Tigner (1856–1938) served in the Georgia State legislature in 1888 and 1889 and from 1902 to 1904. He served as a judge in Columbus, Georgia, from 1909 to 1912.

== Early life and education ==
Germanicus was born on October 2, 1856, in Haralson, Georgia. Son of Senator William Archelaus Tigner and Eugenia R Tigner (née Dozier). He was educated in private schools in Jonesboro and Atlanta.

== Legal career ==
=== Stenography ===
Germanicus was made official stenographer of the Chattahoochee County Circuit in 1876, holding this position until 1892. In 1898 he was appointed as stenographer to the Supreme Court of Georgia.

=== Lawyer ===
He was admitted to the bar in 1889.

=== Judge ===
He was appointed as judge to the City Court of Columbus on January 1, 1909.

== Marriage and family ==
Germanicus was married to Johnny Lindsay on June 27, 1889, in Columbus, Georgia. The couple had two children: Helen (December 22, 1891 – March 10, 1910) and John (September 28, 1894 – September 4, 1911).
