= Germanicus of Smyrna =

Greek saint

Saint Germanicus

Martyr
- Died: 155; Smyrna (modern-day İzmir, Turkey)
- Venerated in: Roman Catholic Church, Eastern Orthodox Church
- Canonized: Pre-congregation
- Feast: 19 January

Saint Germanicus was a youth who was arrested and martyred for his faith in Smyrna during the reign of the Roman Emperor Antoninus. As Germanicus stood in the arena, facing a wild beast, the Roman proconsul pleaded with him that in view of his youth he should deny his faith to obtain a pardon. But the young man refused to apostatize, and willingly embraced martyrdom, and was praised for his courage facing the wild beasts used to kill him.

Germanicus' story is related in the Martyrdom of Polycarp as follows:

For the devil did indeed invent many things against them; but thanks be to God, he could not prevail over all. For the most noble Germanicus strengthened the timidity of others by his own patience, and fought heroically with the wild beasts. For, when the proconsul sought to persuade him, and urged him to take pity upon his age, he attracted the wild beast towards himself, and provoked it, being desirous to escape all the more quickly from an unrighteous and impious world. But upon this the whole multitude, marvelling at the nobility of mind displayed by the devout and godly race of Christians, cried out, "Away with the atheists; let Polycarp be sought out!"

— The Martyrdom of Polycarp, Ch. 3
