= Germán =

Germán (Spanish pronunciation: [xeɾˈman]) is a male given name in Spanish speaking countries. It is a cognate to French Germain, and is a variant of Latin Germanus.

== Surname ==
- Domingo Germán (born 1992), baseball player
- Esteban Germán (born 1978), Dominican professional baseball second baseman
- Franklyn Germán, relief pitcher
- Javier Germán (born 1971), Spanish footballer
- Tamás Germán, Hungarian professional footballer

== Given name ==
=== Art and music ===
- Germán Casas, Chilean singer
- Germán Cueto, Mexican painter
- Germán Gedovius, Mexican painter
- Germán Pedro Ibáñez, Cuban musical director
- Germán Legarreta, Puerto Rican actor
- Germán Londoño, Colombian painter and sculptor
- Germán Magariños, Argentine film director and screenwriter
- Germán Robles, Mexican actor
- Germán Valdés, Mexican actor, singer, and comedian
- Germán Villar, Spanish tenor

=== Humanities and social sciences ===
- Germán Arciniegas, Colombian essayist
- Germán Carrera Damas, Venezuelan historian
- Germán Castro Caycedo, Colombian writer and journalist
- Germán Espinosa, Colombian novelist and poet
- Germán Gullón, Spanish literary critic
- Germán Nogueira Gómez, Cuban author

=== Politics ===
- Germán Busch, President of Bolivia from 1937 to 1939
- Germán List Arzubide, Mexican revolutionary
- Germán Martínez, Mexican politician
- Germán Riesco, President of Chile from 1901 to 1906
- Germán Ignacio Riesco Errázuriz, Chilean politician, son of the above
- Germán Sequeira, Nicaraguan politician
- Germán Serrano Pinto, Costa Rican politician
- Germán Suárez Flamerich, former president of Venezuela
- Germán Trejo, American immigrant rights activist
- Germán Vargas Lleras, Colombian politician and presidential candidate

=== Sport ===
==== Association football ====
- Germán Aceros, Colombian footballer
- Germán Alemanno, Argentine footballer
- Germán Arangio, Argentine footballer
- Germán Beltrán, Spanish footballer
- Germán Burgos, Argentine footballer
- Germán Cano, Argentine footballer
- Germán Carty, Peruvian footballer
- Germán Castillo, Argentine footballer
- Germán Chavarría, Costa Rican footballer
- Germán Denis, Argentine footballer
- Germán Herrera (footballer, born 1983), Argentine forward for Rosario Central
- Germán Herrera (footballer, born 1993), Argentine midfielder for Club Atlético Brown
- Germán Leguía, Peruvian footballer
- Germán Lauro, Argentine shotputter
- Germán Leonforte, Argentine footballer
- Germán Lux, Argentine footballer
- Germán Montoya, Argentine footballer
- Germán Pacheco, Argentine footballer
- Germán Pietrobon, Argentine footballer
- Germán Pinillos, Peruvian footballer
- Germán Ré, Argentine footballer
- Germán Rivarola, Argentine footballer
- Germán Saenz de Miera Colmeneiro, Spanish footballer
- Germán Villa, Mexican footballer
- Germán Voboril, Argentine footballer

==== Other sports ====
- Germán Barranca, Mexican baseball player in the U.S. Major League
- Germán Chiaraviglio, Argentine pole vaulter
- Germán Durán, Mexican baseball player in the U.S. Major League
- German Fernandez, American distance runner
- Germán Figueroa, Puerto Rican wrestler
- Germán Gabriel, Spanish basketball player
- Germán Garrido, Spanish golfer
- German Glessner, Argentine skeleton racer
- Germán González, Venezuelan baseball player in the U.S. Major League
- Germán Jiménez, Mexican baseball player in the U.S. Major League
- Germán López, former Spanish professional tennis player
- Germán Martínez (swimmer), Colombian swimmer
- Germán Mesa, Cuban baseball player
- Germán Orozco, Argentine field hockey player
- Germán Ospina, Colombian cyclist
- Germán Quiroga, Mexican NASCAR Corona Series race car driver
- Germán Recio, Dominican Republic volleyball player
- Germán Rieckehoff, Puerto Rican swimmer and president of the Puerto Rican Olympic Committee
- Germán Rivera, Puerto Rican baseball player in the U.S. Major League
- Germán Sánchez (racewalker), Mexican race walker
- Germán Sánchez (racing driver), Spanish racing driver
- Germán Silva, retired Mexican long-distance runner
- Germán Torres, Mexican boxer

== Other ==
- Germán Abad Valenzuela, Ecuadorian radiologist
- Germán Busch, Bolivian military officer
- Germán Efromovich, South American entrepreneur
- Germán Garmendia, Chilean YouTube comedian
- Germán Larrea Mota-Velasco, Mexican businessman
- Germán Martínez Hidalgo, American scientist
- Germán Olano Moreno, for whom the Captain Germán Olano Moreno Air Base is named
- Germán Pinelli, Cuban journalist
- Germán Sánchez (disambiguation)

- Germán Sánchez Ruipérez, for whom the Germán Sánchez Ruipérez Foundation is named
