= Primauguet =

Primauguet may refer to:

- Hervé de Portzmoguer, nicknamed Primauguet, 15th century Breton naval officer
- French ship Primauguet, the name of several ships
