= Literary feud =

Conflict between well-known writers

A literary feud is a conflict or quarrel between well-known writers, usually conducted in public view by way of published letters, speeches, lectures, and interviews. In the book Literary Feuds, Anthony Arthur describes why readers might be interested in the conflicts between writers: "we wonder how people who so vividly describe human failure (as well as triumph) can themselves fall short of perfection."

Feuds were sometimes based on conflicting views of the nature of literature as between C. P. Snow and F. R. Leavis, or on disdain for each other's work such as the quarrel between Virginia Woolf and Arnold Bennett. Some feuds were conducted through the writers' works, as when Alexander Pope satirized John Hervey in Epistle to Dr Arbuthnot. A few instances resulted in physical violence, such as the encounter between Sinclair Lewis and Theodore Dreiser, and on occasion involved litigation, as in the dispute between Lillian Hellman and Mary McCarthy.

== History of literary feuds ==
A literary feud involves both a public forum and public reprisals. Feuds might begin in the public view through the quarterlies, newspapers, and monthly magazines, but frequently extended into private correspondence and in-person meetings. The participants are literary figures: writers, poets, playwrights, critics. Many feuds were based on opposing philosophies of literature, art, and social issues, although the disputes often devolved into attacks on personality and character. Feuds often have personal, political, commercial, and ideological dimensions.

In Lapham's Quarterly, Hua Hsu compares literary feuds with the one-upmanship of hip-hop artists, "animated...by antipathy, insecurity, jealousy" and notes that "Some of the great literary feuds of the past would have been perfect for the social media age, given their withering brevity." It is not uncommon for observers, particularly the press, to label writers' rivalries and deteriorations in friendships as feuds, such as the rivalry between sisters A. S. Byatt and Margaret Drabble or when Mario Vargas Llosa punched Gabriel García Márquez for an incident involving Vargas Llosa's wife.

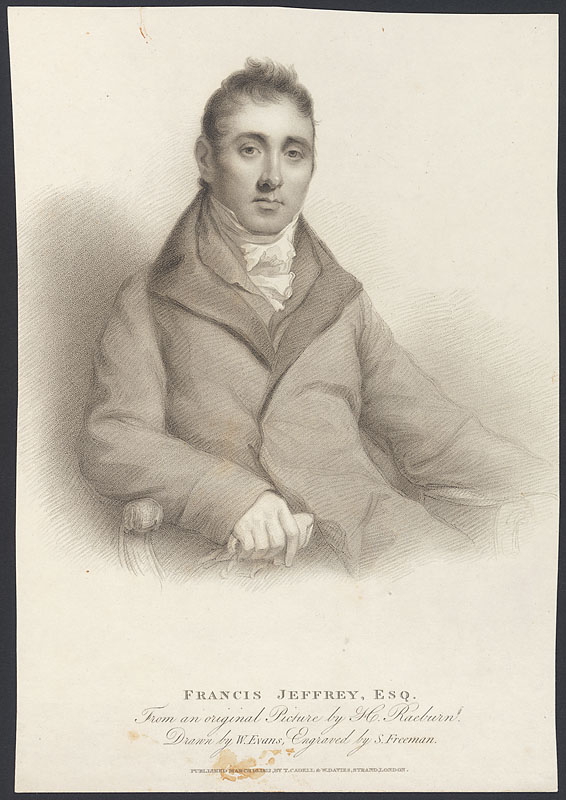
Lord Jeffrey, editor of the Edinburgh Review

During the Romantic era, feuds were encouraged by the Quarterly Review, Edinburgh Review, and Blackwood's Magazine as a marketing tactic. The Edinburgh editor, Francis Jeffrey, wanted a nasty review in each issue, as the responses and reprisals would attract readers. Reviewers were generally anonymous, often using the collective "we" in their reviews, although the actual authorship of reviews tended to be open secrets. Thomas Love Peacock said of the Edinburgh, "The mysterious we of the invisible assassin converts his poisoned dagger into a host of legitimate broadswords." Blackwood's attacked the Cockney School, much as Edinburgh attacked those it dubbed the Lake Poets. Lady Morgan boasted that the Quarterly's attacks on her work just increased her sales.

Coleridge described the Romantic era as "the age of personality" in which the public is preoccupied with the private lives of people in the public eye and accuses the periodicals of the time of having "a habit of malignity". In footnotes to his Biographia Literaria, Coleridge made accusations against Jeffrey without naming him but providing sufficient detail that others would easily know the person he meant. Through his responses, Jeffrey "magnifies a footnote into a feud", going so far as to sign his initials to his rebuttals despite the commonly accepted culture of reviewer anonymity at the time. Coleridge complained that media attention to his quarrel with the Edinburgh editor left him unable to escape from "the degrading Taste of the present Public for personal Gossip". The British Critic weighed in, siding with Coleridge, while Blackwood's launched its own attack on the poet.

Just as attacks could take the form of "persecution by association" in which a writer might be maligned for an actual or perceived allegiance to another writer, reprisals could bring in more participants to engage in "self-defense by association". Scholar John Sloan says of the late 19th century writers, "In the age of mass culture and the popular press, public rowing was regarded as a favourite device for the attention-seekers whose wish was to astonish and arrive."

Dr. Manfred Weidhorn, the Abraham and Irene Guterman Chair in English Literature and professor emeritus of English at Yeshiva University, says "At least one such major confrontation appears in a different country during each of the traditional major phases of Western culture — classical Greece, medieval Germany, Renaissance England, Enlightenment France and England, nineteenth-century Russia, modern America."

=== Classical Greece ===
In classical Greece, poets and playwrights competed at festivals such as City Dionysia and Lenaia. Weidhorn cites a conflict between Euripides and Sophocles as evidenced by the line in Aristotle's Poetics, "Sophocles said that he himself created characters such as should exist, whereas Euripides created ones such as actually do exist." Aristophanes notably caricatured Euripides in his plays. Centuries later, George Bernard Shaw and John Davidson would refer to themselves respectively as Aristophanes and Euripides in correspondence, and their relationship would later deteriorate into a counterpart of the mythical ancient quarrel.

=== Medieval Germany ===
In medieval Germany, Gottfried von Strassburg's Tristan and Wolfram von Eschenbach's Parzival, which were published at the same time, differed on social, esthetic, and moral viewpoints, and resulted in what has been called "one of the more famous literary quarrels in medieval literature", although that characterization based on interpretations of fragments has been disputed by other scholars.

=== Renaissance England ===
For a major confrontation in Renaissance England, Weidhorn posits Shakespeare versus Ben Jonson, referring to the War of the Theatres, also known as the Poetomachia. Scholars differ over the true nature and extent of the rivalry behind the Poetomachia. Some have seen it as a competition between theatre companies rather than individual writers, though this is a minority view. It has even been suggested that the playwrights involved had no serious rivalry and even admired each other, and that the "War" was a self-promotional publicity stunt, a "planned ... quarrel to advertise each other as literary figures and for profit." Most critics see the Poetomachia as a mixture of personal rivalries and serious artistic concerns—"a vehicle for aggressively expressing differences...in literary theory...[a] basic philosophical debate on the status of literary and dramatic authorship."

=== Enlightenment France and England ===
The conflict between Voltaire and Rousseau in France would erupt whenever either of them published a major work, beginning with Voltaire's criticisms to Rousseau's Discourse on Inequality. When Voltaire published Poème sur le désastre de Lisbonne (English title: Poem on the Lisbon Disaster), Rousseau felt the poem "exaggerated man's misery and turned God into a malevolent being". Their various disagreements escalated to Rousseau revealing that Voltaire was the author of a pamphlet Voltaire had published anonymously to avoid arrest.

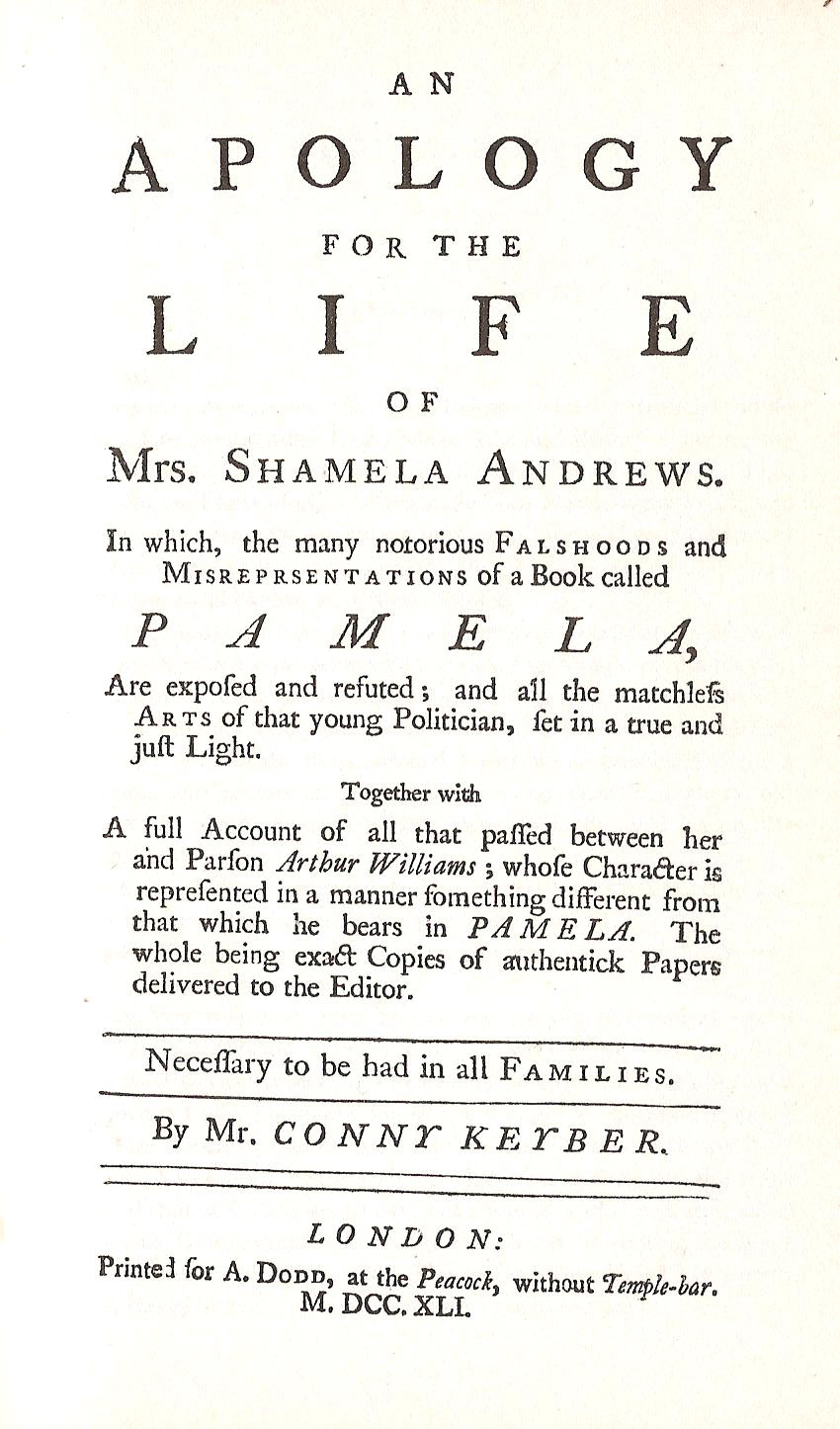
Title page of Shamela

In England, Henry Fielding's novel Shamela and Samuel Richardson's novel Pamela; or, Virtue Rewarded posed opposing views on the purpose of novels and how realism and morals should be reflected. A portion of the subtitle to Shamela was In which the many notorious Falsehoods and Misrepresentations of a Book called Pamela are exposed and refuted. Literary critic Michael LaPointe suggests that Fielding's Shamela in response to Richardson's Pamela represents an exemplary literary feud: "a serious argument about the nature of literature that takes place actually within the literary medium."

A wider ranging literary quarrel became known as the Quarrel of the Ancients and the Moderns. In France at the end of the seventeenth century, a minor furor arose over the question of whether contemporary learning had surpassed what was known by those in Classical Greece and Rome. The "moderns" (epitomised by Bernard le Bovier de Fontenelle) took the position that the modern age of science and reason was superior to the superstitious and limited world of Greece and Rome. In Fontenelle's opinion, modern man saw farther than the ancients ever could. The "ancients," for their part, argued that all that is necessary to be known was to be found in Virgil, Cicero, Homer, and especially Aristotle. The dispute was satirized by Jonathan Swift in The Battle of the Books.

=== Nineteenth-century Russia ===
Both Tolstoy and Dostoyevsky were respected writers in Russia and initially thought well of each other's work. Then Dostoyevsky objected to War and Peace being referred to as an "act of genius", saying Pushkin was the real genius. The writers had opposing views during Russia's war with Turkey, and Tolstoy's view on the war as expressed in the final installment to Anna Karenina angered Dostoyevsky. Tolstoy, in turn, was critical of Dostoyevsky's work, describing The Brothers Karamazov as "anti-artistic, superficial, attitudinizing, irrelevant to the great problems" and said the dialog was ""impossible, completely unnatural.... All the characters speak the same language."

=== Modern America ===
Although Faulkner and Hemingway respected each other's work, Faulkner told a group of college students that he ranked himself higher than Hemingway among American writers because Hemingway was "too careful, too afraid of making mistakes in diction; he lacked courage". Faulkner's remarks were leaked and published in a New York newspaper, infuriating Hemingway. Especially troubled by the comments on his courage, Hemingway requested a letter from an Army general to attest to Hemingway's bravery. Although Faulkner apologized in a letter, he would continue to make similar statements about Hemingway as a writer. Their disputes continued over the years, with Faulkner refusing to review The Old Man and the Sea with what Hemingway took as a vicious insult, and Hemingway saying A Fable was "false and contrived".

== Notable feuds ==
=== Germain de Brie and Thomas More ===
Germain de Brie's most famous work was Chordigerae navis conflagratio ("The Burning of the Ship Cordelière") (1512), a Latin poem about the recent destruction of the Breton flagship Cordelière in the Battle of Saint-Mathieu between the French and English fleets. The poem led to a literary controversy with the English scholar and statesman Sir Thomas More, in part because it contained criticisms of English leaders, but also because of its hyperbolic account of the bravery of the Breton captain Hervé de Portzmoguer. In his epigrams addressed to de Brie, More ridiculed the poem's description of "Hervé fighting indiscriminately with four weapons and a shield; perhaps the fact slipped your mind, but your reader ought to have been informed in advance that Hervé had five hands.

Stung by More's attacks, de Brie wrote an aggressive reply, the Latin verse satire Antimorus (1519), including an appendix which contained a "page-by-page listing of the mistakes in More's poems". Sir Thomas immediately wrote another hard-hitting pamphlet, Letter against Brixius, but Erasmus intervened to calm the situation, and persuaded More to stop the sale of the publication and let the matter drop.

=== Thomas Nashe and Gabriel Harvey ===
The feud between Thomas Nashe and Gabriel Harvey was conducted through pamphlet wars in 16th century England and was so well known that Shakespeare's play Love's Labour's Lost included references to the quarrel.

- In 1590, Gabriel's brother Richard criticized Nashe in his work The Lamb of God.
- In 1592, Robert Greene responded in A Quip for an Upstart Courtier with a satiric passage that ridicules a ropemaker and his three sons, which was taken to refer to Gabriel, Richard, and John Harvey, but then removed it in subsequent printings.
- Nashe attacked Richard Harvey in Pierce Penniless, writing "Would you, in likely reason, gesse it were possible for any shame-swolne toad to have the spet-proofe face to out live this disgrace?"
- Gabriel Harvey responded to Greene in Four Letters and in it criticized Nashe to defend his brother.
- Nashe responded with Strange News of Intercepting Certain Letters attacking Gabriel at length.
- Gabriel Harvey wrote Pierce's Supererogation, however before it is published, Nashe published a letter to Christ's Tears apologizing to Harvey.
- Gabriel Harvey responded with A New Letter of Notable Content, rejecting reconciliation with Nashe.
- Nashe revised his letter to Christ's Tears to respond angrily, then wrote a fuller response in Have with You to Saffron Walden in 1597, in which he claimed to continue the quarrel to salvage his own reputation.
- In 1599, Archbishop Whitgift and Richard Bancroft, bishop of London, banned all works by Nashe and Harvey in an order against satiric and contentious publications.

Although it began as a controversy between factions of writers, it became a personal quarrel between Nash and Gabriel Harvey after John Harvey and Robert Greene both died and Richard Harvey withdrew from participation. There is some speculation that the controversy was encouraged to sell more books.

=== Molière and Edmé Boursault ===
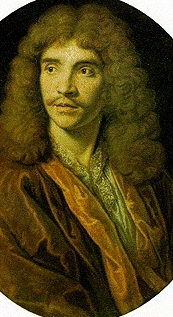
Portrait of Molière

The play Portrait of the Painter, or Criticisms of the School for Women Criticized (French: Le Portrait du Peintre ou La Contre-critique de L’École des femmes, September 1663) by Edmé Boursault was part of an ongoing literary quarrel over The School for Wives (1662) by Molière.

The original play had caricatured "male-dominated exploitative marital relationships", and became a target of criticism. Criticisms ranged from accusing Molière of impiety, to nitpicking over the perceived lack of realism in certain scenes. Molière had answered his critics with a second play, The School for Women Criticized (French: La Critique de L’École des femmes, June 1663).

Boursault wrote his play in answer to this second play. In The School for Women Criticized, Molière poked fun at his critics by having their arguments expressed on stage by comical fools, while the character defending the original play, a mouthpiece for the writer, is a straight man with serious and thoughtful replies. In his Portrait, Boursault imitates the structure of Molière's play but subjects the characters to a role reversal. In other words, the critics of Molière are featured as serious and his defenders as fools. Boursault probably included other malicious and personal attacks on Molière and his associates in the stage version, which were edited out in time for publication. The modern scholar can only guess at their nature by Molière's haste to respond.

Molière answered with a third play of his own, The Versailles Impromptu (French: L'Impromptu de Versailles, October 1663), which reportedly took him only eight days to write. It went on stage two weeks (or less) after the Portrait. This play takes place in the theatrical world, featuring actors playing actors on stage. Among jests aimed at various targets, Molière mocks Boursault for his obscurity. The characters have trouble even remembering the name of someone called "Brossaut". Molière further taunts the upstart as "a publicity-seeking hack".

=== Alexander Pope and John Hervey ===
John Hervey was the object of savage satire on the part of Alexander Pope, in whose works he figured as Lord Fanny, Sporus, Adonis and Narcissus. The quarrel is generally put down to Pope's jealousy of Hervey's friendship with Lady Mary Wortley Montagu. In the first of the Imitations of Horace, addressed to William Fortescue, Lord Fanny and Sappho were generally identified with Hervey and Lady Mary, although Pope denied the personal intention. Hervey had already been attacked in the Dunciad and the Peribathous, and he now retaliated. There is no doubt that he had a share in the Verses to the Imitator of Horace (1732) and it is possible that he was the sole author. In the Letter from a nobleman at Hampton Court to a Doctor of Divinity (1733), he scoffed at Pope's deformity and humble birth.

Pope's reply was a Letter to a Noble Lord, dated November 1733, and the portrait of Sporus in the Epistle to Dr Arbuthnot (1743), which forms the prologue to the satires. Many of the insinuations and insults contained in it are borrowed from Pulteney's A Proper Reply to a late Scurrilous Libel.

=== Ugo Foscolo and Urbano Lampredi ===
In 1810, Ugo Foscolo wrote a satirical essay, Ragguaglio d'un'adunanza dell'Accademia de' Pitagorici, that mocked a group of Milanese literary figures. One of those figures, Urbano Lampredi, responded harshly in the literary journal Corriere Milanese. Foscolo's response called Lampredi "King of the league of literary charlatans". The dispute extended to the Il Poligrafo and Annali di scienze e lettere journals.

=== Lord Byron and John Keats ===
Lord Byron disdained the poetry of John Keats, the son of a livery-stable keeper, calling Keats a "Cockney poet" and referring to "Johnny Keats' piss-a-bed poetry". In turn, Keats claimed the success of Bryon's work was due more to his pedigree and appearance than any merit.

=== Charles Dickens, Edmund Yates, and W. M. Thackeray ===
In the 1850s, Charles Dickens and William Makepeace Thackeray were considered competitors for novelist of the era. They were not friends, and it was well known among their fellow members of the Garrick Club that should one enter the room, the other would quickly make excuses and leave.

In 1858, Dickens and his wife were separating. He was made aware that Thackeray had commented to a third party that Dickens's marital discord was due to an actress. Edmund Yates, a friend of Dickens, published an unflattering profile of Thackeray in Town Talk. Thackeray accused Yates of writing a piece that was "slanderous and untrue", but Yates refused to apologize and replied that Thackeray's letter was the "slanderous and untrue document".

Thackeray requested that the Garrick Club take action against Yates for behaviour "intolerable in a Society of Gentlemen". The club leadership demanded that Yates apologize or quit the club; Yates refused to do either, and threatened to hire a barrister. Dickens offered to mediate the disagreement, which Thackeray refused. In describing his quarrel with Yates, Thackeray said, "I am hitting the man behind him", referring to Dickens.

=== William Dean Howells and Edmund Stedman ===
In 1886, William Dean Howells and Edmund Stedman traded verbal blows in the pages of Harper's Monthly and the New Princeton Review. Their disagreements on the origins of literary craftsmanship and the limits of historical knowledge were reported on by other periodicals, such as The Critic, the Boston Gazette, and the Penny Post. The conflict stemmed from Howell's promotion of literary realism against Stedman's defense of idealism.

=== Marcel Proust and Jean Lorrain ===
Jean Lorrain wrote an unfavorable review of Marcel Proust's Pleasures and Days in which he insinuated that Proust was having an affair with Lucien Daudet. Proust challenged Lorrain to a duel. The two writers exchanged shots from twenty-five paces on 5 February 1897, and neither was hit by a bullet.

=== Mark Twain and Bret Harte ===
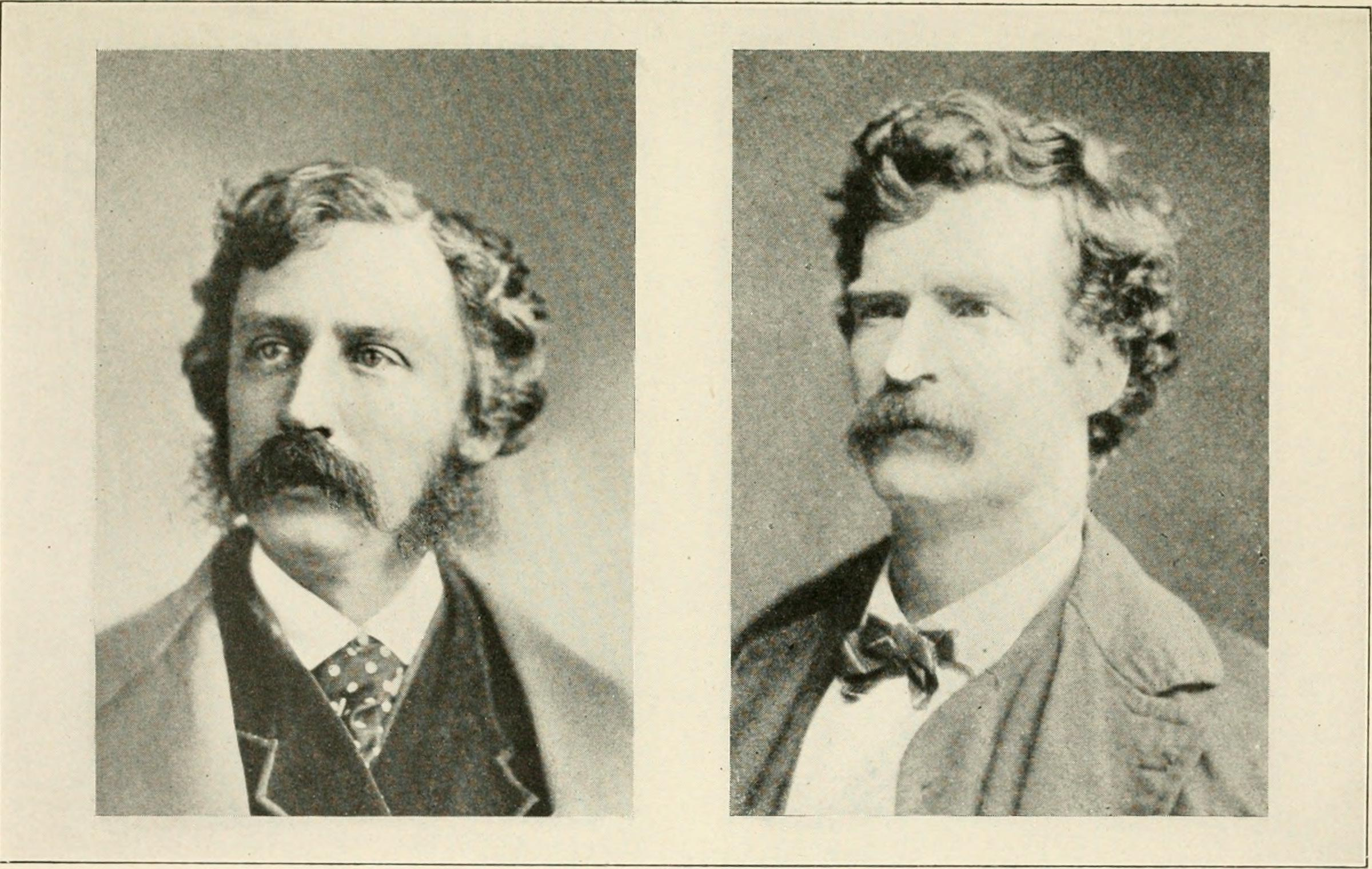
Bret Harte (left) and Mark Twain

Mark Twain and Bret Harte, both popular American writers in the nineteenth century, were colleagues, friends, and competitors. Harte, as the editor of a magazine called Overland Monthly, "trimmed and trained and schooled" Twain into becoming a better writer, as Twain put it. In late 1876, Twain and Harte agreed to collaborate on a play, Ah Sin, that featured the character Hop Sing from Harte's earlier play, Two Men of Sandy Bar. Neither writer was satisfied with the script that resulted, and both of them were dealing with other difficulties in their lives at the time: Harte with financial troubles and drinking, and Twain with his Huckleberry Finn manuscript. The biographer Marilyn Duckett dates the estrangement between Harte and Twain to their letters in 1877, when Twain suggested that he hire Harte to work on another play with him for $25 a week (rather than lend him any money), and Harte reacted with outrage. Harte also held Twain responsible for recommending a publisher who would then mishandle Harte's novel, and declared that because of the financial losses that resulted, he need not repay Twain money he had previously borrowed. Twain described Harte's letter as "ineffable idiotcy".

Twain reworked Ah Sin without Harte, and it opened on Broadway in July, although it was not a success. The final direct communication between the two writers was a telegram from Harte asking for his share of the box office receipts.

When some influential friends recommended Harte to then-President Rutherford B. Hayes for a diplomatic post, Twain contacted William Dean Howells, who was related by marriage to the President, to work against any such appointment, claiming that Harte would disgrace the nation. Twain's letter included "Wherever he goes his wake is tumultuous with swindled grocers & with defrauded innocents who have loaned him money...No man who has ever known him respects him." However, Harte would eventually win an appointment to Germany.

As Twain's fame as a writer grew and Harte's faded, Twain continued to comment on Harte's work and character, including the suggestion that Harte was homosexual. Even several years after Harte's death, in Twain's reminiscences which were published as Mark Twain in Eruption, Twain included derisive comments about Harte: "He hadn't any more passion for his country than an oyster has for its bed; in fact not so much, and I apologize to the oyster."

=== Edgar Allan Poe and Thomas Dunn English ===
Thomas Dunn English was a friend of author Edgar Allan Poe, but the two fell out amidst a public scandal involving Poe and the writers Frances Sargent Osgood and Elizabeth F. Ellet. After suggestions that her letters to Poe contained indiscreet material, Ellet asked her brother to demand the return of the letters. Poe, who claimed he had already returned the letters, asked English for a pistol to defend himself from Ellet's infuriated brother. English was skeptical of Poe's story and suggested that he end the scandal by retracting the "unfounded charges" against Ellet. The angry Poe pushed English into a fistfight, during which his face was cut by English's ring. Poe later claimed to have given English "a flogging which he will remember to the day of his death", though English denied it; either way, the fight ended their friendship and stoked further gossip about the scandal.

Later that year, Poe harshly criticized English's work as part of his "Literati of New York" series published in Godey's Lady's Book, referring to him as "a man without the commonest school education busying himself in attempts to instruct mankind in topics of literature". The two had several confrontations, usually centered around literary caricatures of one another. One of English's letters which was published in the 23 July 1846, issue of the New York Mirror caused Poe to successfully sue the editors of the Mirror for libel. Poe was awarded $225.06 as well as an additional $101.42 in court costs. That year English published a novel called 1844, or, The Power of the S.F. Its plot made references to secret societies, and ultimately was about revenge. It included a character named Marmaduke Hammerhead, the famous author of The Black Crow, who uses phrases like "Nevermore" and "lost Lenore." The clear parody of Poe was portrayed as a drunkard, liar, and domestic abuser. Poe's story "The Cask of Amontillado" was written as a response, using very specific references to English's novel. Years later, in 1870, when English edited the magazine The Old Guard, founded by the Poe-defender Charles Chauncey Burr, he found occasion to publish both an anti-Poe article (June 1870) and an article defending Poe's greatest detractor Rufus Wilmot Griswold (October 1870).

=== Edgar Allan Poe and Rufus Wilmot Griswold ===
The writer Rufus Wilmot Griswold first met Poe in Philadelphia in May 1841 while working for the Daily Standard. In a letter dated 29 March 1841, Poe sent Griswold several poems for The Poets and Poetry of America anthology, writing that he would be proud to see "one or two of them in the book". Griswold included three of these poems: "Coliseum", "The Haunted Palace", and "The Sleeper". In November of that year, Poe, who had previously praised Griswold in his "Autography" series as "a gentleman of fine taste and sound judgment", wrote a critical review of the anthology, on Griswold's behalf. Griswold paid Poe for the review and used his influence to have it published in a Boston periodical. The review was generally favorable, although Poe questioned the inclusion of certain authors and the omission of others. Griswold had expected more praise and Poe privately told others he was not particularly impressed by the book, even calling it "a most outrageous humbug" in a letter to a friend. In another letter, this time to fellow writer Frederick W. Thomas, Poe suggested that Griswold's promise to help get the review published was actually a bribe for a favorable review, knowing Poe needed the money.

Making the relationship even more strained, only months later, Griswold was hired by George Rex Graham to take up Poe's former position as editor of Graham's Magazine. Griswold, however, was paid more and given more editorial control of the magazine than Poe. Shortly after, Poe began presenting a series of lectures called "The Poets and Poetry of America". Poe openly attacked Griswold in front of his large audience and continued to do so in similar lectures. Another source of animosity between the two men was their competition for the attention of the poet Frances Sargent Osgood in the mid to late 1840s.

After Poe's death, Griswold prepared an obituary signed with the pseudonym "Ludwig". First printed in the 9 October 1849, issue of the New York Tribune, it was soon republished many times. Griswold asserted that "few will be grieved" by Poe's death as he had few friends. He claimed that Poe often wandered the streets, either in "madness or melancholy", mumbling and cursing to himself, was easily irritated, was envious of others, and that he "regarded society as composed of villains". Poe's drive to succeed, Griswold wrote, was because he sought "the right to despise a world which galled his self-conceit". Much of this characterization of Poe was copied almost verbatim from that of the fictitious Francis Vivian in The Caxtons by Edward Bulwer-Lytton.

Griswold claimed that "among the last requests of Mr. Poe" was that he become his literary executor "for the benefit of his family". Griswold, along with James Russell Lowell and Nathaniel Parker Willis, edited a posthumous collection of Poe's works published in three volumes starting in January 1850. He did not share the profits of his edition with Poe's surviving relatives. This edition included a biographical sketch titled "Memoir of the Author" which has become notorious for its inaccuracy. The "Memoir" depicts Poe as a madman, addicted to drugs and chronically drunk. Many elements were fabricated by Griswold using forged letters as evidence and it was denounced by those who knew Poe, including Sarah Helen Whitman, Charles Frederick Briggs, and George Rex Graham. Some of the information that Griswold asserted or implied was that Poe was expelled from the University of Virginia and that Poe had tried to seduce his guardian John Allan's second wife. Griswold's characterization of Poe and the false information he originated appeared consistently in Poe biographies for the next two decades.

=== Virginia Woolf and Arnold Bennett ===
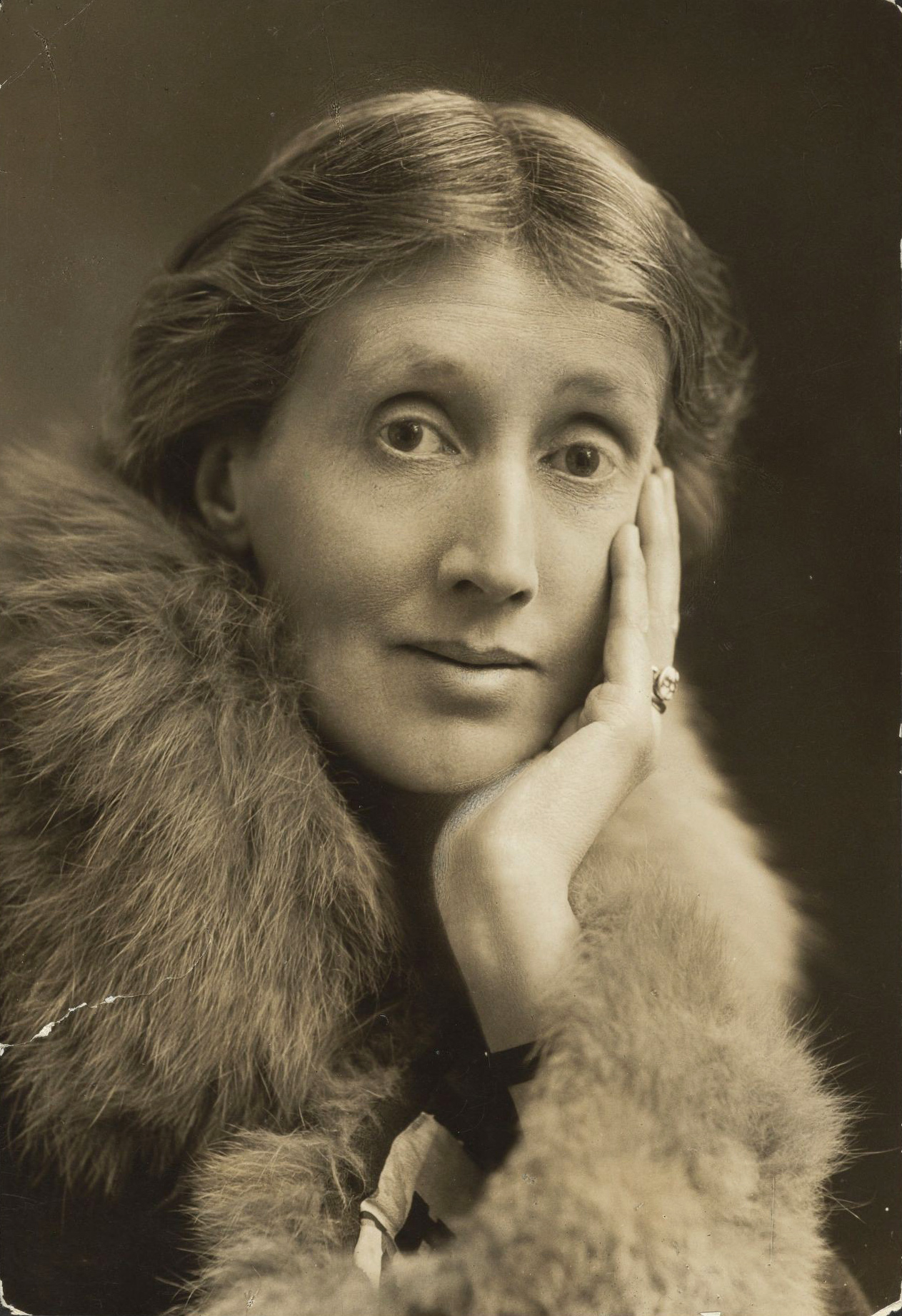
Virginia Woolf

Arnold Bennett wrote an article called "Is the Novel Decaying?" in 1923 in which, as an example, he criticized Virginia Woolf's characterizations in Jacob's Room. Woolf responded with "Mr. Bennett and Mrs. Brown" in the Nation and Athenaeum. In her original piece, Woolf misquoted Bennett's article. She then significantly rewrote the essay "to ridicule, patronize, and actually distort Bennett's writing".

Though he didn't respond immediately, Bennett later began an anti-Woolf campaign in a weekly column in the Evening Standard, giving negative reviews of three of Woolf's novels. His reviews continued the attack on Woolf's characterizations, saying "Mrs. Woolf (in my opinion) told us ten thousand things about Mrs. Dalloway, but did not show us Mrs. Dalloway." His essay "The Progress of the Novel" for the journal The Realist was a refutation of "Mr. Bennett and Mrs. Brown". Of Woolf, he says "I regard her alleged form as the absence of form, and her psychology as an uncoordinated mass of interesting details, none of which is truly original."

Although the two writers met socially and acted with civility, each recorded the meetings harshly in their respective journals. On Bennett's death, Woolf wrote in her diary, "Queer how one regrets the dispersal of anybody who seemed—as I say—genuine; who had direct contact with life—for he abused me; and I yet rather wished him to go on abusing me; and me abusing him."

=== Vladimir Nabokov and Edmund Wilson ===
The feud between Vladimir Nabokov and Edmund Wilson began in 1965. After a twenty-five-year friendship which was at times strained due to Nabokov's disdain for Wilson's political views and then later by Wilson's criticism of Lolita, the two writers ultimately fell out over the translation of Alexander Pushkin's Eugene Onegin.

In 1964, Nabokov published his translation of the Russian classic, which he felt conformed scrupulously to the sense of the poem while completely eschewing melody and rhyme. Wilson's review of Nabokov's translation in the New York Review of Books was cutting and disparaging. In his book The Feud, Alex Beam describes Wilson's review as "an overlong, spiteful, stochastically accurate, generally useless but unfailingly amusing hatchet job".

Rejoinders and rebuttals spread from New York Review to Encounter and the New Statesman. Other writers, such as Anthony Burgess, Robert Lowell, V. S. Pritchett, Robert Graves, and Paul Fussell joined in the dispute.

Years later, hearing that Wilson was ill, Nabokov wrote to him, saying that he no longer held a "grudge for your incomprehensible incomprehension of Pushkin's and Nabokov's Onegin."

=== Norman Mailer and Gore Vidal ===
In 1971, Gore Vidal compared Norman Mailer to Charles Manson in Vidal's review of The Prisoner of Sex. When the two writers were guests on the same episode of The Dick Cavett Show, Mailer punched Vidal in the hospitality room, then brought up the review again on the live show. Six years later at a party, Mailer threw a drink in Vidal's face and followed it with a punch. Vidal is said to have responded, "Norman, once again words have failed you."

=== Gore Vidal and Truman Capote ===
Gore Vidal and Truman Capote were competitive acquaintances who were, initially, cordial. Their first open argument began at a party hosted by Tennessee Williams. Williams said, "They began to criticize each other's work. Gore told Truman he got all of his plots out of Carson McCullers and Eudora Welty. Truman said 'Well, maybe you get all of yours from the Daily News.' And so the fight was on."

In 1975 Vidal sued Capote for slander over the accusation that he had been thrown out of the White House for being drunk, putting his arm around the first lady and then insulting Mrs. Kennedy's mother. Capote's defense was damaged when Lee Radziwill refused to testify on Capote's behalf. Despite her prior deposition, Radziwill said, "I do not recall ever discussing with Truman Capote the incident or the evening which I understand is the subject of this lawsuit." Ultimately, Capote offered a pro forma apology and the suit was settled out of court.

Vidal responded to news of Capote's death by calling it "a wise career move".

=== John Updike, Tom Wolfe, Norman Mailer, and John Irving ===
Because of the success of Tom Wolfe's best selling novel, Bonfire of the Vanities, there was widespread interest in his next book. This novel took him more than 11 years to complete; A Man in Full was published in 1998. The book's reception was not universally favorable, though it received glowing reviews in Time, Newsweek, The Wall Street Journal, and elsewhere. Noted author John Updike wrote a critical review for The New Yorker, complaining that the novel "amounts to entertainment, not literature, even literature in a modest aspirant form." His comments sparked an intense war of words in the print and broadcast media among Wolfe and Updike, and authors John Irving and Norman Mailer who also entered the fray, with Irving saying in a television interview, "He's not a writer...You couldn't teach that bleeping bleep to bleeping freshmen in a bleeping freshman English class!." In 2001, Wolfe published an essay referring to these three authors as "My Three Stooges" which he reprinted in his collection Hooking Up. In it, he implies that Updike, Mailer, and Irving were jealous of his success because their own recent books had not been bestsellers.

=== Sinclair Lewis and Theodore Dreiser ===
In 1927, Theodore Dreiser and Sinclair Lewis's soon-to-be wife Dorothy Thompson spent some time together while they were both visiting Russia. The next year, Thompson published The New Russia. Several months later, Dreiser published Dreiser Looks at Russia. Thompson and Lewis accused Dreiser of plagiarizing portions of Thompson's work, which Dreiser denied and claimed instead that Thompson had used material of his.

In June 1930, Lewis and Dreiser were in contention for the Nobel Prize in Literature. Lewis won, the first American to be awarded the prize. Several months after the ceremony, the writers encountered each other at the Metropolitan Club at a dinner honoring Boris Pilnyak. After much drinking, Lewis rose to give the welcome speech, but instead declared he "did not care to speak in the presence of a man who has stolen three thousand words from my wife's book."

After dinner, Dreiser approached Lewis and asked him to take back his statement. When Lewis repeated it, Dreiser recalls, "I smacked him. And I asked him if he wanted to say it again. He said it again. So I smacked him again." When another guest intervened, Dreiser left, saying "I'll meet you any time, anywhere. This thing isn't settled." The fight made headlines around the world, even being referred to as "the slap heard round the world".

=== C. P. Snow and F. R. Leavis ===
British scientist and novelist C. P. Snow delivered The Two Cultures, the first part of an influential 1959 Rede Lecture, on 7 May 1959 . Snow's lecture condemned the British educational system as having, since the Victorian era, over-rewarded the humanities (especially Latin and Greek) at the expense of scientific and engineering education, despite such achievements having been so decisive in winning the Second World War for the Allies. The literary critic F. R. Leavis was incensed by Snow's implication that, in the alliance between the sciences and the humanities, literary intellectuals were the "junior partner".

Leavis called Snow a "public relations man" for the scientific establishment in his essay Two Cultures?: The Significance of C. P. Snow, published in The Spectator in 1962 and wrote "as a novelist he doesn't exist...utterly without a glimmer of what creative literature is or why it matters." The article attracted a great deal of negative correspondence in the magazine's letters pages and some of Snow's friends suggested that he sue Leavis for defamation.

Although Snow chose not to engage with Leavis, others defended Snow. In the United States, a reviewer for The New Republic declared Leavis was acting out of "pure hysteria" and was displaying "persecution mania".

=== Lillian Hellman and Mary McCarthy ===
Mary McCarthy's feud with Lillian Hellman had simmered since the late 1930s over ideological differences, particularly the questions of the Moscow Trials and of Hellman's support for the "Popular Front" with Stalin. Then, in a 1979 television interview, McCarthy, long Hellman's political adversary and the object of her negative literary judgment, said of Hellman that "every word she writes is a lie, including 'and' and 'the'." Hellman responded by filing a US$2,500,000 defamation suit against McCarthy, interviewer Dick Cavett, and PBS. McCarthy in turn produced evidence she said proved that Hellman had lied in some accounts of her life. Cavett said he sympathized more with McCarthy than Hellman in the lawsuit, but "everybody lost" as a result of it. Norman Mailer attempted unsuccessfully to mediate the dispute through an open letter he published in the New York Times. At the time of her death, Hellman was still in litigation with McCarthy; her executors dropped the suit. Observers of the trial noted the resulting irony of Hellman's defamation suit is that it brought significant scrutiny, and decline of Hellman's reputation, by forcing McCarthy and her supporters to prove that she had lied.

=== Salman Rushdie and John le Carré ===
During The Satanic Verses controversy, le Carré stated that Rushdie's insistence on publishing the paperback was putting lives at risk. Eight years later, Rushdie criticized le Carré for overreacting when a reviewer claimed The Tailor of Panama contained anti-Semitism. Rushdie and le Carré then engaged in angry exchanges in The Guardian and The Times. They would not reconcile for fifteen years. Each has since said that they regretted engaging in the conflict.

=== Paul Theroux and V. S. Naipaul ===
Paul Theroux and V. S. Naipaul met in 1966 in Kampala, Uganda. Their friendship cooled when Theroux criticized Naipaul's work. Later, Theroux took offense when he found books he had inscribed to Naipaul offered for sale in a rare books catalog. Naipaul's biographer claimed that Naipaul belittled Theroux's writing. Then in 1998, Theroux portrayed Naipaul in an unattractive light in his memoir Sir Vidia's Shadow, saying that "his rejection of me meant I was...out of his shadow" after Naipaul had snubbed him because Theroux had expressed disapproval of Naipaul's second marriage. The feud lasted fifteen years, until the writers were reconciled at the 2011 Hay Literary Festival, although there is some speculation that the reconciliation was engineered by their agents and publishing houses to increase sales.

=== V. S. Naipaul and Derek Walcott ===
Derek Walcott and V. S. Naipaul were both from the West Indies, and each was a recipient of the Nobel Prize in Literature. Walcott was critical of Naipaul's work, viewing him as a sellout for crafting a persona that rejected his Indo-Caribbean roots. Walcott reviewed Naipaul's The Enigma of Arrival in 1987, writing "The myth of Naipaul...has long been a farce." Naipaul countered in 2007, praising Walcott's early work, then describing him as "a man whose talent had been all but strangled by his colonial setting" and saying "He went stale".

Walcott famously criticized Naipaul in his poem "Mongoose", which he read aloud at the Calabash International Literary Festival in 2008. One reviewer described the poem as "a savagely humorous demolition of Naipaul's later novels Half a Life and Magic Seeds".

=== Richard Ford and multiple writers ===
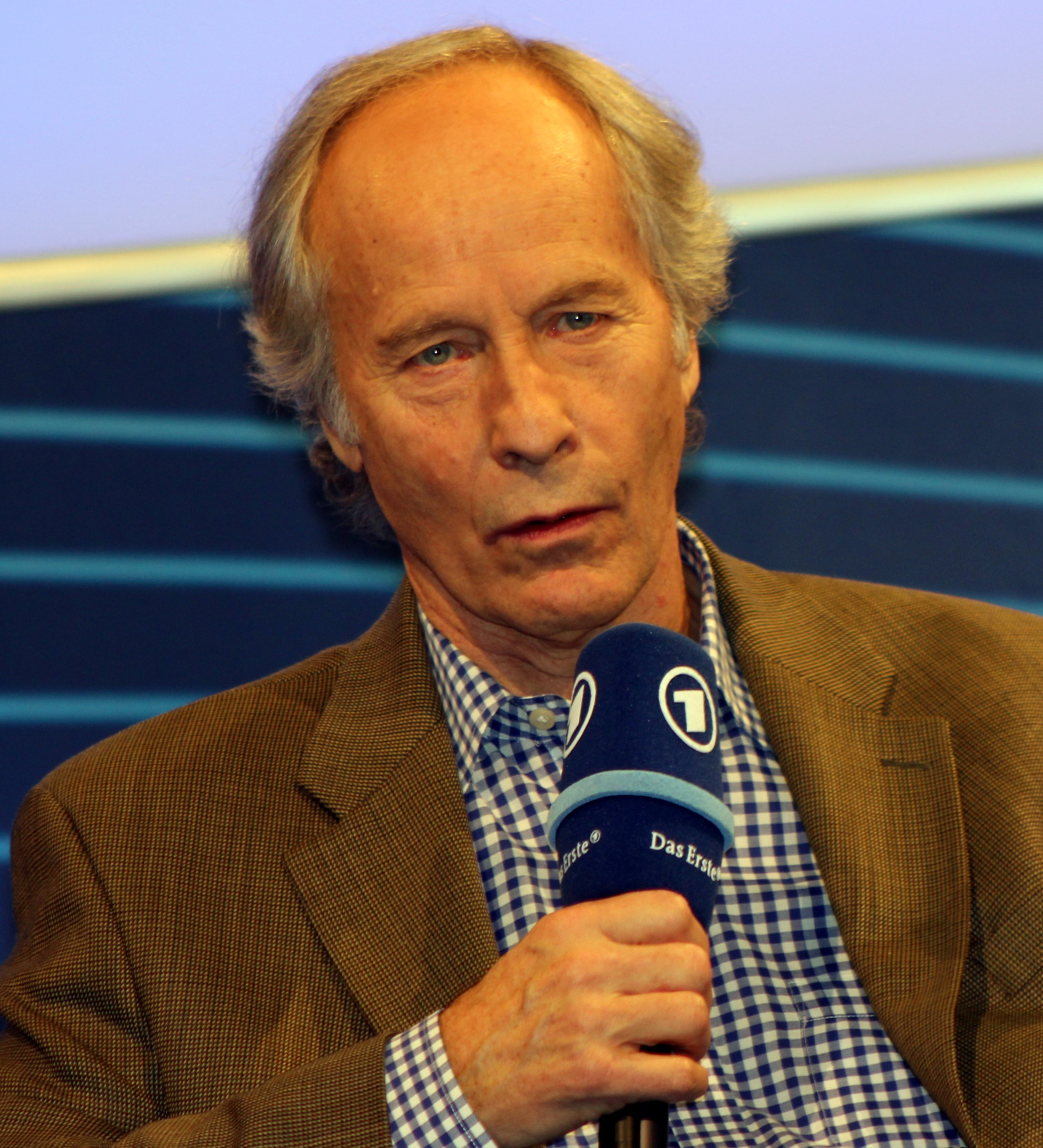
Richard Ford (2012)

Alice Hoffman reviewed Richard Ford's novel Independence Day for The New York Times. The review contained some criticisms, which Ford described as "nasty things", and Ford claimed his response was to shoot one of Hoffman's books and send it to her. In an interview, Ford said "But people make such a big deal out of it – shooting a book – it's not like I shot her."

In 2001, Colson Whitehead wrote an unfavorable review of Ford's book A Multitude of Sins for The New York Times. When the two writers encountered each other at a party several years later, Ford told Whitehead, "You’re a kid, you should grow up", and then spat in Whitehead's face. Ford addressed the disagreement in a 2017 essay for Esquire, writing "as of today, I don’t feel any different about Mr. Whitehead, or his review, or my response".

When it was announced in 2019 that Ford would be awarded the Hadada prize, other writers, including Viet Thanh Nguyen, Sarah Weinman, and Saeed Jones, criticized the decision, citing Ford's history of poor conduct.

== See also ==
- Mac Flecknoe
- Isaac Bickerstaff
- Fleshly School
- Who Is the Bad Art Friend?
