= HMS Regent =

Three vessels bearing the name Regent or HMS Regent have served England or the Royal Navy:

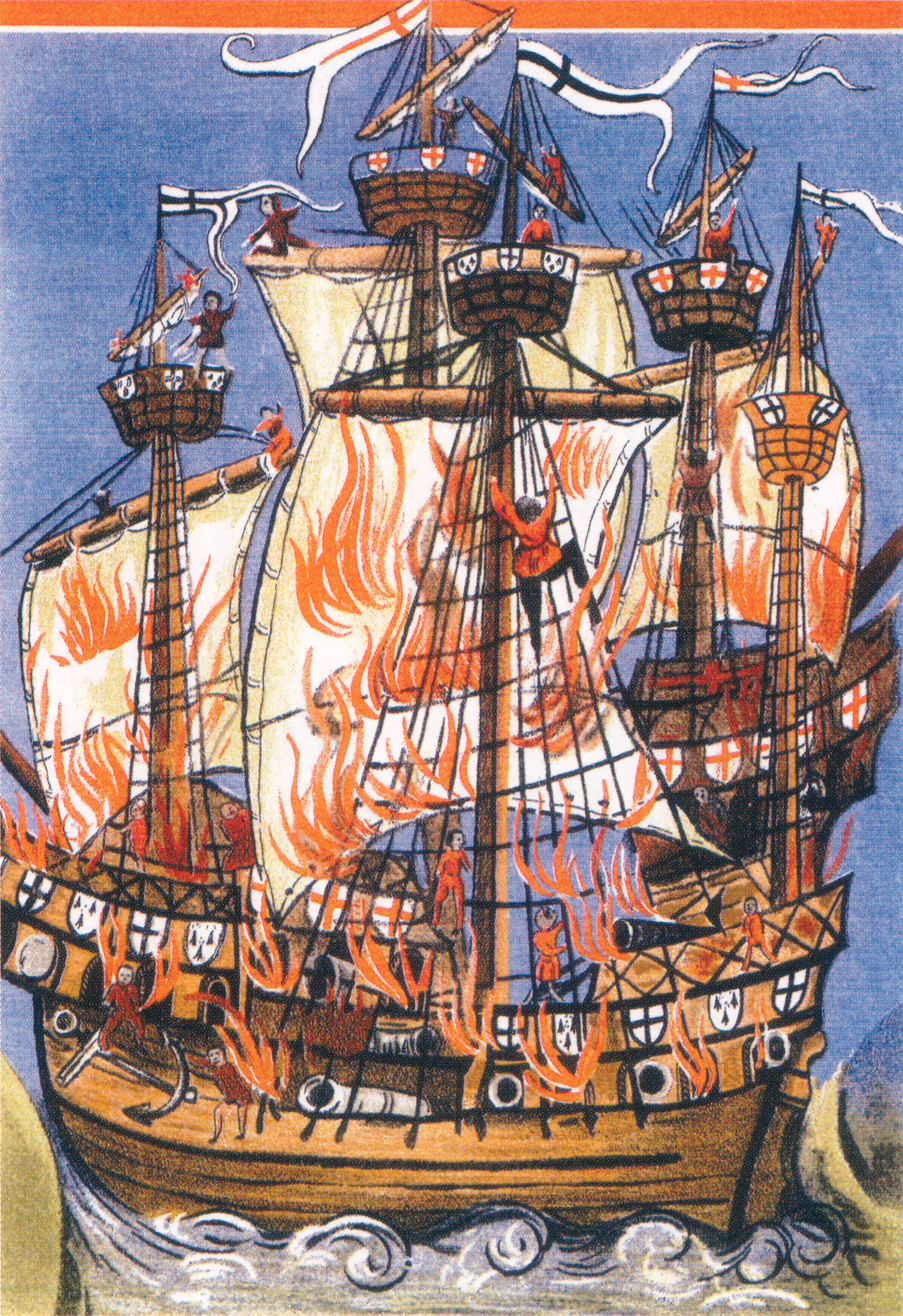
A contemporary image of Cordeliere (bearing the Flag of Brittany) and Regent (with the Flag of England) on fire. Illustration to the poem Chordigerae navis conflagratio by Germain de Brie.

- Grace Dieu (or Grace à Dieu), was a 600 or 1000 tons (bm) vessel launched at Chatham in 1488. She was renamed Regent the next year. In 1512, she was the flagship of English admiral Sir Thomas Knyvett. On 10 August 1512, she was destroyed during the Battle of St. Mathieu when Hervé de Portzmoguer, captain of Cordelière, sacrificed his vessel to sink Regent. The English were boarding Cordelière when her powder magazine blew up (some say it was deliberately ignited). Knyvett and de Portzmoguer both perished, along with 1,628 French and English sailors.
- HMS Regent was a French 16 to 18-gun brig of 350 tons (bm) that the British captured at Genoa in 1814, the Royal Navy purchased in 1816 but then transferred to the Revenue service, and that was sold in 1824. She then became the Colombian government brig Victoria.
- HMS Regent (N41) was a Rainbow-class submarine launched in 1930 and sunk by a mine with the loss of all hands in 1943.
