= Ricardo Trevilla Trejo =

Mexican defense minister

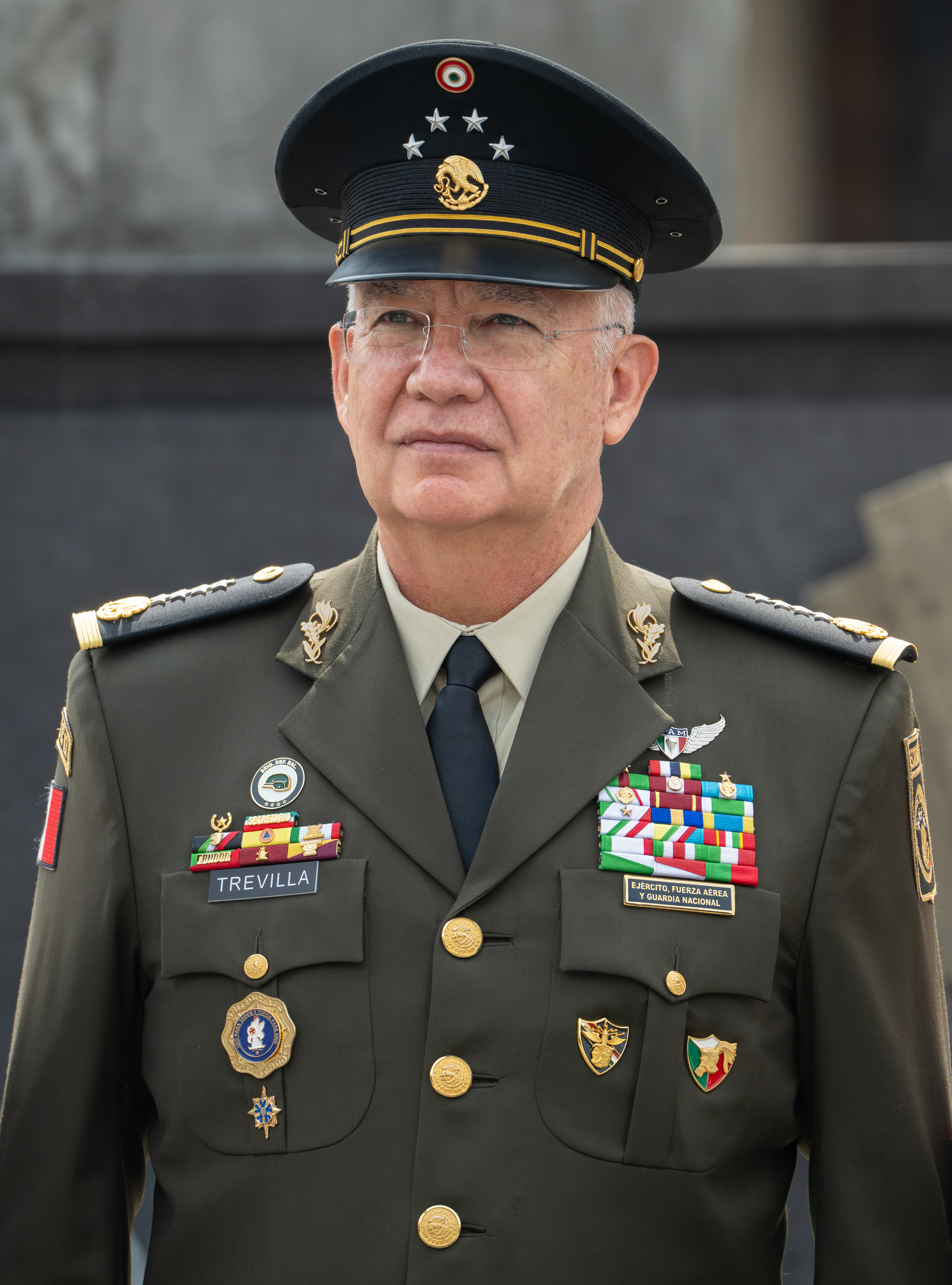

Secretary of National Defense
- Incumbent
- Assumed office 1 October 2024
- President: Claudia Sheinbaum
- Preceded by: Luis Cresencio Sandoval

Personal details
- Born: 8 January 1961 (age 65) Ciudad del Carmen, Campeche, Mexico
- Education: Heroico Colegio Militar; Universidad del Valle de México (MPA)

Military service
- Allegiance: Mexico
- Branch/service: Mexican Army
- Years of service: 1978—present
- Rank: General
- Battles/wars: Mexican Drug War; 2026 Jalisco operation; 2026 Mexico cartel unrest

Ricardo Trevilla Trejo (Note: In this Mexican name, the surname is Trevilla and the second or maternal family name is Trejo.) (born 8 January 1961) is a Mexican army officer and the current Secretary of National Defense under president Claudia Sheinbaum. He directed the 2026 Jalisco operation, which resulted in the death of El Mencho, leader of the Jalisco New Generation Cartel. He was also a spokesman for the defense ministry during Operation Black Swan, the re-capture of El Chapo, in 2016.

== Biography ==
=== Early life, education, and career background ===
Ricardo Trevilla Trejo was born on 8 January 1961 in Ciudad del Carmen, Campeche.

Trevilla joined the armed forces in September 1978, at the age of 17. He then graduated from the Heroic Military College and the Higher School of War (Escuela Superior de Guerra). Later in his career, he would also graduate with a master's degree in Military Administration from the National Defense College (Colegio de Defensa Nacional), and a master's degree in Public Administration from the Universidad del Valle de México (UVM).

Throughout his career, Trevilla passed training in multiple areas of expertise. He attended a basic parachutist course (with the Brigada de Fusileros Paracaidistas), an English language course, a German language course, a military intelligence course (at WHINSEC), and an international affairs course at the University of Bonn, among others.

Pursuant to his training, Trevilla was formerly Mexico's Military and Air Attaché to Germany.

Trevilla was previously commander of the 16th Motorized Cavalry Regiment in Atlixco, the Piedras Negras Military Garrison, chief of staff of the 6/a military zone in Saltillo, and deputy chief of staff of the Chiapas border area. On the general staff, he was Director of the Center for Language Studies, General Director of Social Communication, and Chief of the Joint Chiefs of Staff.

=== Secretary of National Defense ===
Claudia Sheinbaum, then president-elect, nominated Trevilla to be the next Secretary of National Defense on 6 September 2024. He was sworn into office on 1 October 2024, the same day as Sheinbaum.

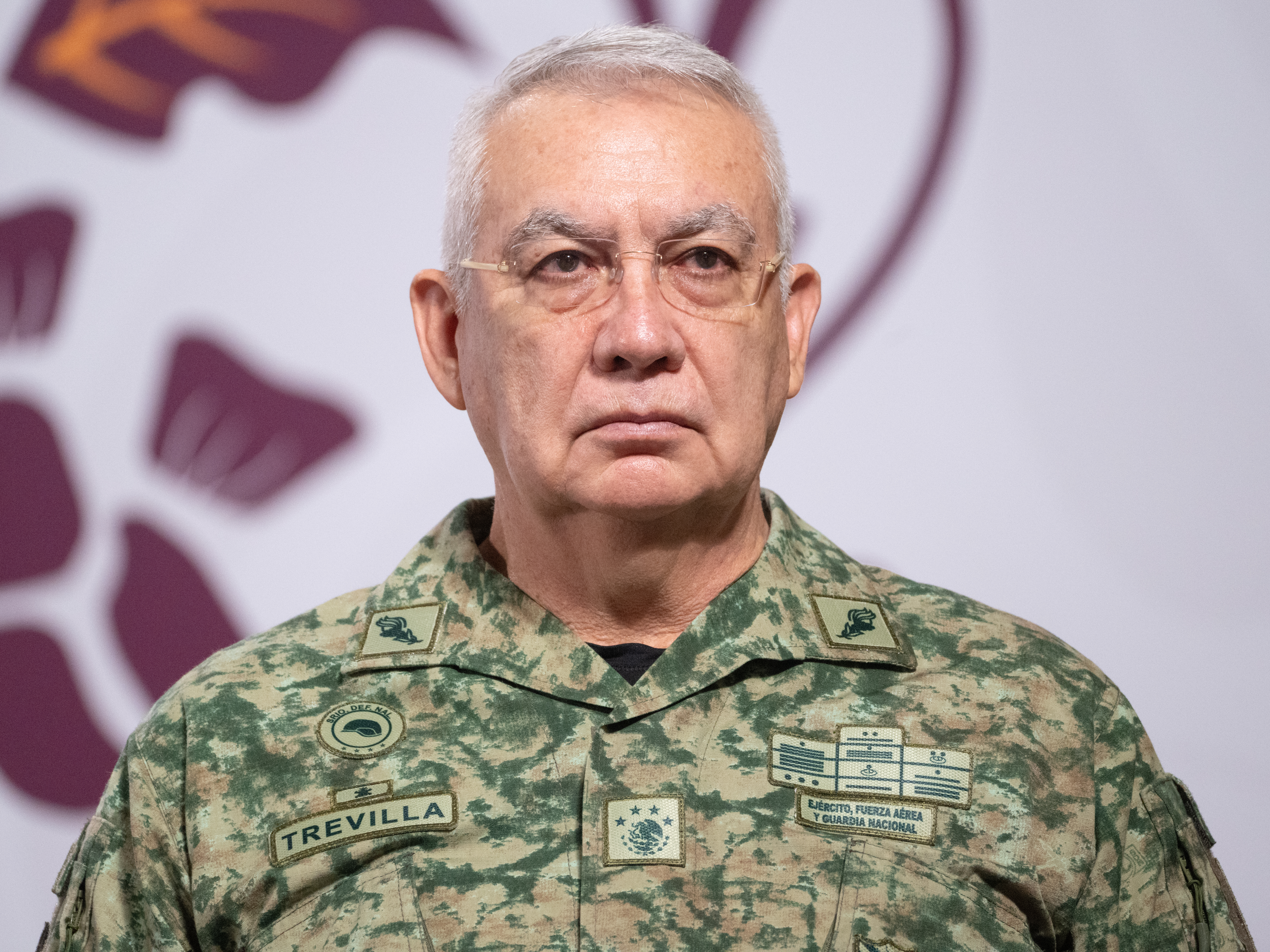
Trevilla in 2025

==== 2026 Jalisco operation and unrest ====
Immediately following the killing of El Mencho, unrest and violence broke out among remaining cartel members and government forces. Cartel members created more than 250 roadblocks across twenty states, killing at least 25 National Guard personnel, a corrections officer, a state prosecutor, and a civilian bystander, among others. In response, Trevilla gave a press conference on 23 February 2026 condemning the violence and detailing the attacks on military forces.

==== Modernization ====
In June 2026, Trevilla announced a comprehensive modernization plan that was to be undertaken by the defense ministry. With a projected timeline extending to 2050, the administration was planning to acquire cargo, transport, and personnel aircraft. An emphasis was placed on using helicopters and other assets to assist humanitarian operations, such as disaster relief, as opposed to purchasing newer fighter jet platforms, which will be a long-term acquisition goal.
