= Germain (name) =

Germain is the French variant of the name Germanus.

Notable people with the name include:

== Surname ==
- Adrienne Germain (1947–2022), American women's health advocate
- André Germain (1903–1988), French cinematographer
- Anthony Germain, Canadian politician
- Bruno Germain (born 1960), French association football player
- Columbus Germain (1827–1880), American politician
- François-Thomas Germain (1726–1791), French silversmith
- George Germain, 1st Viscount Sackville (1775–1782), British Secretary of State during the American Revolutionary War
- Ivor Germain (1923–1982), Barbadian boxer of the 1940s and 1950s
- Jean-Claude Germain (1939–2025), Canadian playwright, author, journalist and historian
- Louis Germain (1878–1942), French malacologist
- Paul Germain (born 1959), American animation producer
- Ronald Germain, American immunologist
- Ryo Germain (born 1995), Japanese association football player
- Sophie Germain (1776–1831), French mathematician
- Tabitha St. Germain, Canadian stage and voice actress
- Valère Germain (born 1990), French association football player, son of Bruno

== Given name ==
- Germain Chiniquy, birth name of Gerry Chiniquy (1912–1989), American animator
- Germain de Brie (c. 1490–1538), French poet, writing in Latin
- Germain Ifedi (born 1994), American football player
- Germain Kambinga, Congolese politician

== Pseudonym ==
- "Mr. KABC", pseudonym of Marc Germain (born 1967), a radio talk show host in Los Angeles, California
- "Ernest Germain", pseudonym of Ernest Mandel (1923 in – 1995), a Trotskyist politician in Belgium
