= Trejo =

Trejo is a surname which originated in Spain in the province Cádiz. Spanish: habitational name from a place in Cádiz named Trejo. Asturian-Leonese: Castilianized form of a habitational name from Trexo a place in Asturias (Spain). During the Spanish colonial empire of the Americas many people with this surname immigrated to the region.

Source: Dictionary of American Family Names 2nd edition, 2022

- Alan Trejo (born 1996), American baseball player
- Alejandro Trejo (born 1954), Chilean actor
- Arnulfo Trejo (1922–2002), American writer and professor
- Danny Trejo (born 1944), American film actor
- Germán Trejo, Mexican American activist
- José Luis Trejo (born 1951), Mexican football coach
- Lucas Trejo (born 1987), Argentine football player
- Mario Trejo (writer) (1926-2012), Argentine poet, playwright, screenwriter and journalist
- Óscar Trejo (born 1988), Argentine footballer
- Priscila Trejo (born 1987), TV Show Host, weather woman
- Rubén Trejo (1937–2009), American sculptor and painter
- Stephen Trejo (born 1977), American football player

== See also ==
- Trejo pistol
