= Edward Howard (admiral) =

English admiral (1476/1477–1513)

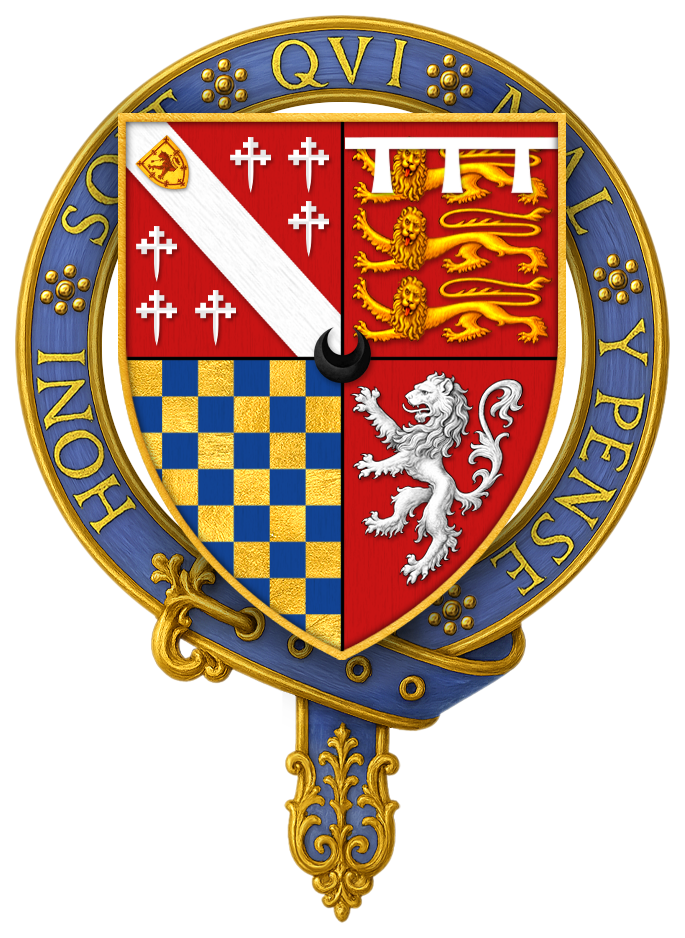
- Arms of Sir Edward Howard, KG
- Born: 1476/1477
- Died: 1513 (aged 36–37)
- Occupation: naval officer
- Years active: 1492–1513
- Known for: first of the Howards to win fame as an admiral
- Notable work: in command during the Battle of Saint-Mathieu
- Spouses: Elizabeth Stapleton (died 1505), Alice Parker, 9th Baroness Morley (m.bef.Jan 1506)
- Children: two unnamed bastard sons
- Parents: Thomas Howard (later 2nd Duke of Norfolk) (father); Elizabeth Tilney (mother)
- Relatives: Thomas Howard, 3rd Duke of Norfolk (older brother)

Sir Edward Howard (1476/1477 – 25 April 1513) was an English naval officer. He was the first of the Howards to win fame as an admiral, participating in his first naval battle while in his teens. He was in command during the Battle of Saint-Mathieu, which may have been the first sea battle fought by ships with cannons deployed through ports. He was killed shortly afterwards, leading an assault on galleys in the French fleet near Brest.

== Early life ==
The son of Thomas Howard (later 2nd Duke of Norfolk) and his first wife, Elizabeth Tilney, and a younger brother of Thomas Howard, 3rd Duke of Norfolk, Howard's date of birth can be determined only approximately, and nothing is known of his early upbringing or education. He began his military career in August 1492 at the age of fifteen under Sir Edward Poynings at the siege of Sluys. In 1497 his father, then Earl of Surrey, was given a command in Scotland and took his sons Thomas and Edward with him. Surrey knighted both Thomas and Edward on 30 September 1497 at Ayton Castle after the signing of a treaty concluding an invasion by James IV of Scotland. In 1503 Howard was among those who escorted Margaret Tudor to Scotland for her marriage to King James IV.

King Henry VII died on 21 April 1509. Howard played a prominent role in the tournament held to celebrate the coronation of the new King, Henry VIII, and was appointed the King's standard-bearer on 20 May 1509.

== Naval career ==
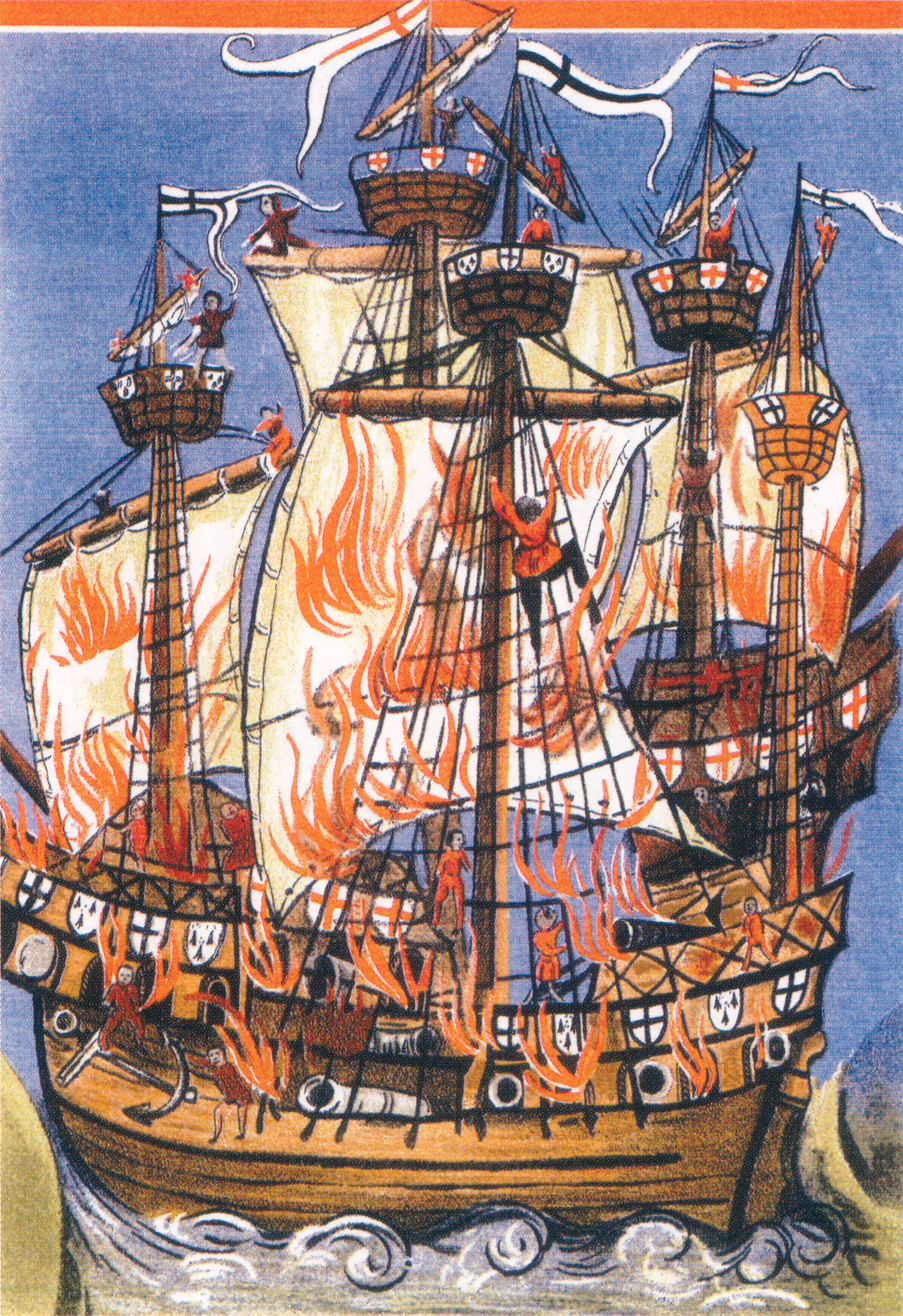
Breton flagship Cordelière and the Regent ablaze at the Battle of Saint-Mathieu. Illustration to Germain de Brie's poem Chordigerae navis conflagratio.

Between June and August 1511 Howard was paid over £600 to fit out ships for the conveying of "merchant aventurers", and both Holinshed and the Ballad of Andrew Barton record that in the course of these seafaring operations he and his brother Thomas captured the ships of the Scottish adventurer Andrew Barton. Barton was sailing in his warship Lion and the small Jennet of Purwyn, (a captured Danish ship) with a Scottish royal Letter of Marque, which was a license to plunder Portuguese ships as a privateer. Both ships were captured and taken to Blackwall. Andrew Barton was killed during their capture.

When war with France broke out in April 1512, Howard was appointed admiral of a fleet of 18 ships sent by the King to keep the seas between Brest and the Thames estuary. Howard seized vessels of various nationalities on the pretext that they were carrying French cargoes. At the beginning of June, he escorted to Brittany the army which Henry was sending to France under the Marquess of Dorset with the hope of recovering Guyenne. Howard then raided Le Conquet and Crozon on the Breton coast. During June and July 1512 Howard effectively controlled the Channel and is said to have captured more than 60 vessels. By August, a French fleet had assembled at Brest. Howard attacked, and in the ensuing Battle of Saint-Mathieu the two largest ships on either side, the Regent and the Marie de la Cordelière, were destroyed when the latter's magazine exploded. Although undefeated, the French retreated. On 10 October the King showed his appreciation by awarding Howard an annuity of 100 marks and the reversion of the office of Lord High Admiral held by the Earl of Oxford.

The French King had Prégent de Bidoux bring 6 galleys from the Mediterranean in the late autumn of 1512, and by the end of March 1513 a sizeable French fleet had been mobilized. On 10 March 1513 the Earl of Oxford died, and Howard became Lord Admiral. On 19 March he sailed from the Thames, reaching Plymouth on 5 April. Without waiting for his supply ships, he set out from Plymouth and found the French fleet, which retreated into Brest. Howard lost one ship on a hidden rock, and on 22 April was attacked by Bidoux's galleys, whose heavy guns sank another ship. On 25 April Howard decided to attack the galleys with his smaller boats known as row-barges. Howard led the attack on Bidoux's flagship in person. During the fighting he was forced over the side of the galley and drowned by the weight of his armour. Both his body and his silver whistle, the Lord Admiral's badge of office, were found three days later, and delivered to Bidoux at Le Conquet, who sent the armour as a trophy to Princess Claude, the French King's daughter, and the whistle to Queen Anne.

Demoralised by Howard's death and short of supplies, the English fleet retreated to Plymouth, where Howard's brother Thomas took command. The French were unable to exploit Howard's death, and after successful English campaigns in Picardy and Scotland, a truce was agreed on in March 1514.

Howard had been elected to the Order of the Garter in 1513, but died before being installed.

== Marriages and issue ==
Howard's first wife was Elizabeth Stapleton (born 1441), widow of Sir William Calthorpe and Sir John Fortescue (died 1500). She died on 18 February 1505. Before January 1506, he married Alice (d. 1518), the daughter and heir of William Lovel, Lord Morley, and Eleanor, Baroness Morley, and widow of Sir William Parker. She was 10 or 12 years Howard's senior, and held the barony of Morley in her own right. There were no children of the marriage.

When Howard wrote his will in January 1513 he left bequests to two unnamed bastard sons, commending one to the care of the King, and the other to the care of his friend Charles Brandon, 1st Duke of Suffolk. As a younger son, he held only the manor of Morley in Norfolk, which he willed in reversion to his stepson, Henry Parker, after the termination of his widow's life interest.

== Footnotes ==
Political offices
Preceded by The Earl of Oxford	Lord High Admiral; 1513–1513	Succeeded by Earl of Surrey
