= Germán Sánchez =

Germán Sánchez may refer to:

- Germán Sánchez (racewalker) (born 1967), Mexican race walker
- Germán Sánchez (footballer) (born 1986), Spanish footballer
- Germán Sánchez (racing driver) (born 1989), Spanish racing driver
- Germán Sánchez (diver) (born 1992), Mexican diver
- German Sánchez (skier) (born 1972), Mexican Olympic skier

== See also ==
- Germán Sierra Sánchez (born 1956), Mexican politician
