= French ship Primauguet =

Primauget may refer to one of the following ships of the French Navy named in honour of Hervé de Portzmoguer:

- French brig Primauguet (1830), a brig
- French corvette Primauguet (1852), a steam corvette
- French cruiser Primauguet (1882), a cruiser
- French ship Primauguet (1919), a transport
- French cruiser Primauguet (1924), a Duguay-Trouin-class cruiser
- French frigate Primauguet (D644), a Georges Leygues-class frigate in active service
