= Battle of Saint-Mathieu =

1512 naval battle during the War of the League of Cambrai

- Part of the War of the League of Cambrai
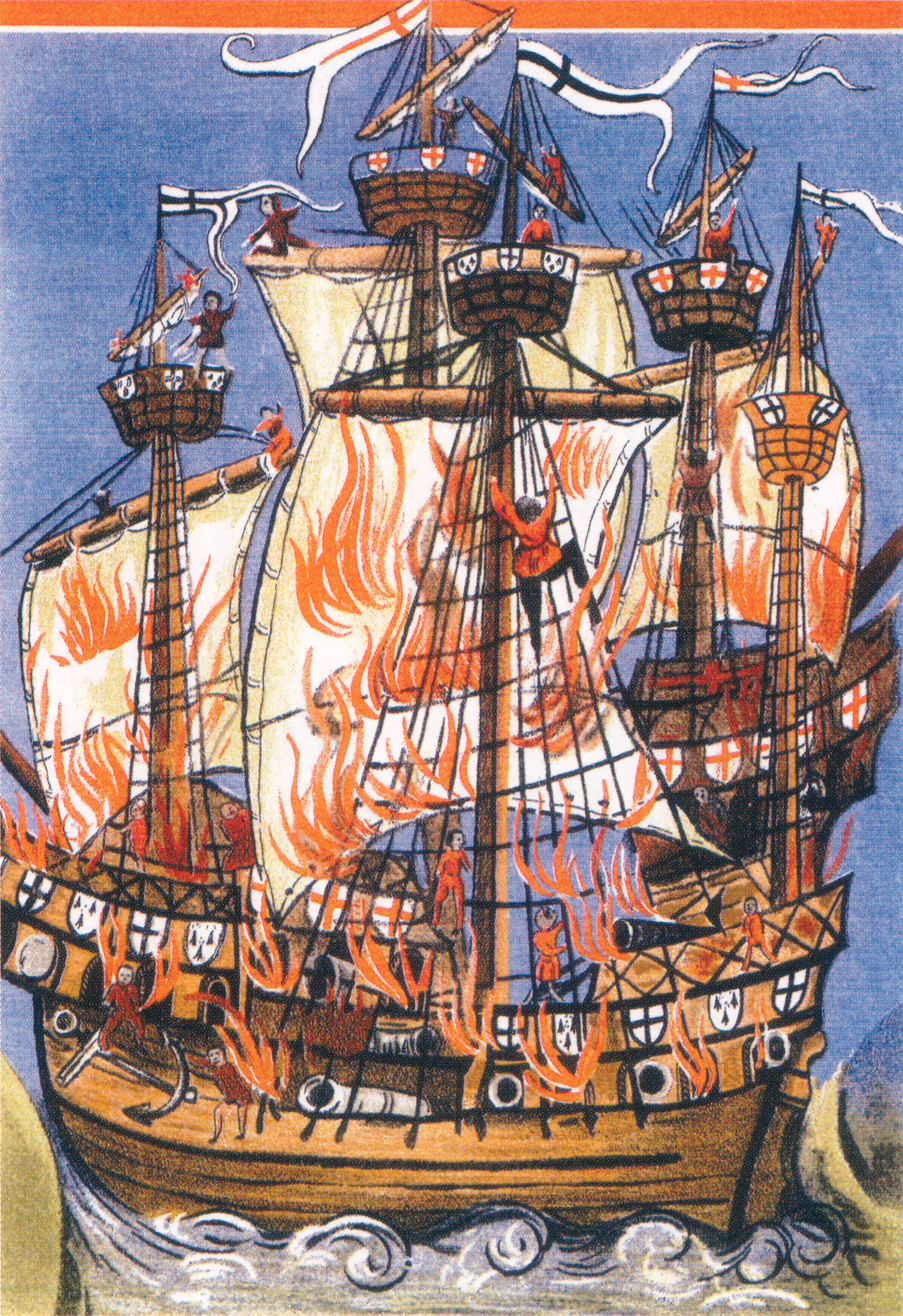
- 16th-century illustration made to accompany a Germain de Brie poem, showing Marie-la-Cordelière and Regent on fire
Date	10 August 1512
Location	Off Pointe Saint-Mathieu, Iroise Sea 48.33°N 4.77°W
Result	English victory

Belligerents
England	France; Brittany

Commanders and leaders
Edward Howard	René de Clermont

Strength
25 warships	22 warships

Casualties and losses
400 killed 1 warship destroyed	1,230 killed 1 warship destroyed

The Battle of Saint-Mathieu took place on 10 August 1512 during the War of the League of Cambrai, near Brest, France, between an English fleet of 25 ships commanded by Sir Edward Howard and a Franco-Breton fleet of 22 ships commanded by René de Clermont. It is possibly the first battle between ships using cannon through ports, although this played a minor role in the fighting. This was one of only two full-fledged naval battles fought by King Henry VIII's Tudor navy, along with the later Battle of the Solent. During the battle, each navy's largest and most powerful ship — Regent and the Marie-la-Cordelière (or simply Cordelière) – were destroyed in a large explosion aboard the latter.

== Background ==
Although the War of the League of Cambrai, sometimes known as the War of the Holy League (among several alternative names), was largely an Italian war, nearly every significant power in Western Europe participated at one point or another, including France, England, and Brittany. The latter was de facto independent of France, although the Dukes of Brittany were vassals to the French King.

When war with France broke out in April 1512, England's Edward Howard was appointed admiral of a fleet sent by King Henry VIII to control the sea between Brest and the Thames estuary. Howard seized vessels of various nationalities on the pretext that they were carrying French cargoes. At the beginning of June, he escorted to Brittany an army which Henry sent to France under the command of Thomas Grey, 2nd Marquess of Dorset, with the hope of recovering Guyenne. Howard then raided Le Conquet and Crozon on the Breton coast. During June and July, Howard effectively controlled the English Channel and is said to have captured more than 60 vessels. By August, a French-Breton fleet had assembled at Brest; Howard moved to attack them.

== Battle ==
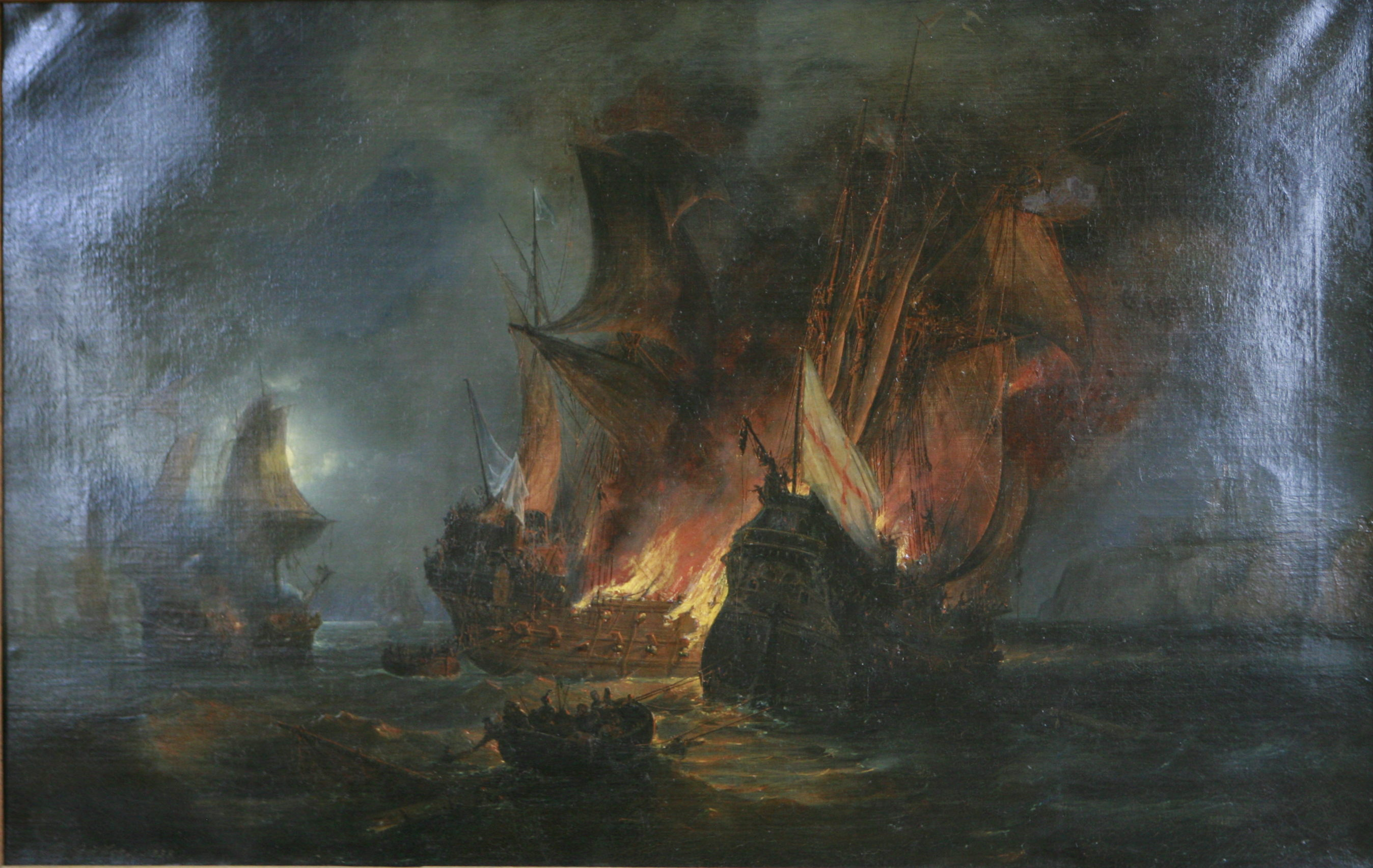
1838 painting of the battle by Pierre-Julien Gilbert which inaccurately shows late-16th century ship designs

Well informed about the Franco-Breton manoeuvres, the English surprised them at anchor. Unprepared and confronted by a superior fleet, all the French and Breton ships cut their anchor cables and spread their sails. By accident, about 300 guests, including some women, were visiting the Breton flagship Marie-la-Cordelière when it was attacked. In the hurry, Hervé de Portzmoguer, the captain of the ship, could not disembark them and the crew was thus reinforced by those "involuntary" combatants who, however, fought bravely.

Marie-la-Cordelière and Petite Louise confronted the English to cover the retreat of the rest of the French fleet to the port of Brest. Under English fire, the 1,000-ton Marie-la-Cordelière, one of the largest warships of her era, sailed towards the 600-ton Regent, which was the largest and most powerful ship in the Tudor navy. Sovereign and Mary James rushed to rescue Regent and surrounded Marie-la-Cordelière, while the superior fire of Mary Rose badly damaged the Petite Louise which was forced to retreat. Marie-la-Cordelière remained alone among the English fleet, with the exception of the small Nef-de-Dieppe which harassed the English ships. Marie-la-Cordelière's cannons dismasted both Sovereign and Mary James which became ungovernable and drifted in the Iroise Sea.

De Portzmoguer proceeded to order his crew to capture Regent. Grappling hooks were thrown and the two ships were tied together. The seamen of Marie-la-Cordelière rushed on Regent's deck which was constantly being reinforced by English ships transferring their crews onto Regent. Nef-de-Dieppe manoeuvered to bombard these new assailants. The deck of Regent was covered by blood when Marie-la-Cordelière suddenly exploded. The flames spread to the Regent and both ships blew up and sank. The crews of both ships were almost entirely annihilated. Only 20 wounded sailors out of 1,250 were saved from the Cordelière, and of the 460-strong crew of Regent only 60 were rescued. Howard was devastated by the death of Thomas Knyvett, the captain of Regent, and vowed "that he will never see the King in the face till he hath revenged the death of the noble and valiant knight, Sir Thomas Knyvet."

== Aftermath ==
Over the next two days, with the French fleet in Brest, the English fleet captured or destroyed thirty-two French vessels and recovered the valuable French anchors before returning to England. As a result of the engagement Sir Edward Howard was made Lord High Admiral by Henry VIII. Brittany and France were still de facto separate states at the time, although the Duchess Anne was a vassal of King Louis XII of France, whom she had also recently married. The combination of the French and Breton fleets was thus the first significant military action in which the two countries fought together, twenty four years after the Battle of Saint-Aubin-du-Cormier (1488), the last battle between them. It thus became symbolic within Brittany of the unity between Brittany and France.

The destruction of the Breton ship Marie la Cordelière quickly became famous. French poets Humbert de Montmoret and Germain de Brie both wrote poems about it. The latter work presented such an exaggeratedly heroic version of the death of Hervé de Portzmoguer, that it occasioned a satirical response from Thomas More, leading to a literary battle between More and de Brie. The death of de Portzmoguer, on the day of Saint Lawrence (10 August), was later portrayed as a deliberate act of self-sacrificing heroism. He is supposed to have said «Nous allons fêter saint Laurent qui périt par le feu!». ("we will celebrate the feast of Saint Lawrence, who died by fire") before blowing up the ship to avoid its capture. In fact, there is no evidence that the explosion was intentional and early literary accounts make no such claims. This version was commemorated by the Breton poet Théodore Botrel. A similar version is portrayed by Alan Simon in the song Marie la Cordelière from Anne de Bretagne (2008). In 2018, the French government announced it was searching for the wrecks of Marie-la-Cordelière and Regent.

== Order of battle ==
England (Edward Howard) (List is probable not certain): Regent (Thomas Knyvet) – Burnt; Sovereign (Charles Brandon) – Dismasted; Jenett; Barbara; Mary Barking; Mary Rose (Thomas Wyndham); Peter Pomegranate; John Hopton; Mary John; Anne of Greenwich; Mary George; Dragon; Lion; George of Falmouth; Peter of Fowey; Nicholas of Hampton; Martinet; Christopher Davy; Sabyn; Nicholas Reede; Margaret of Topsham (James Knyvet); Mary James (Anthony Ughtred) –Dismasted; Magdalene (J. Brigandyne); Henry of Hampton; Catherine Pomegranate (Henry Gyldeford)	France & Brittany (René de Clermont): Nef de Rouen; Nef d'Orléans; Nef de Dieppe; Nef de Bordeaux; Petite Louise – Damaged; Nef de Morlaix (Marie la Cordelière) (Hervé de Porzmoguer aka Primauguet) – Burnt; Nef de Brest; Nef de Rochelle; Nef de Bordeaux; Saint Sauveur; 12 others
