= Germán Nogueira Gómez =

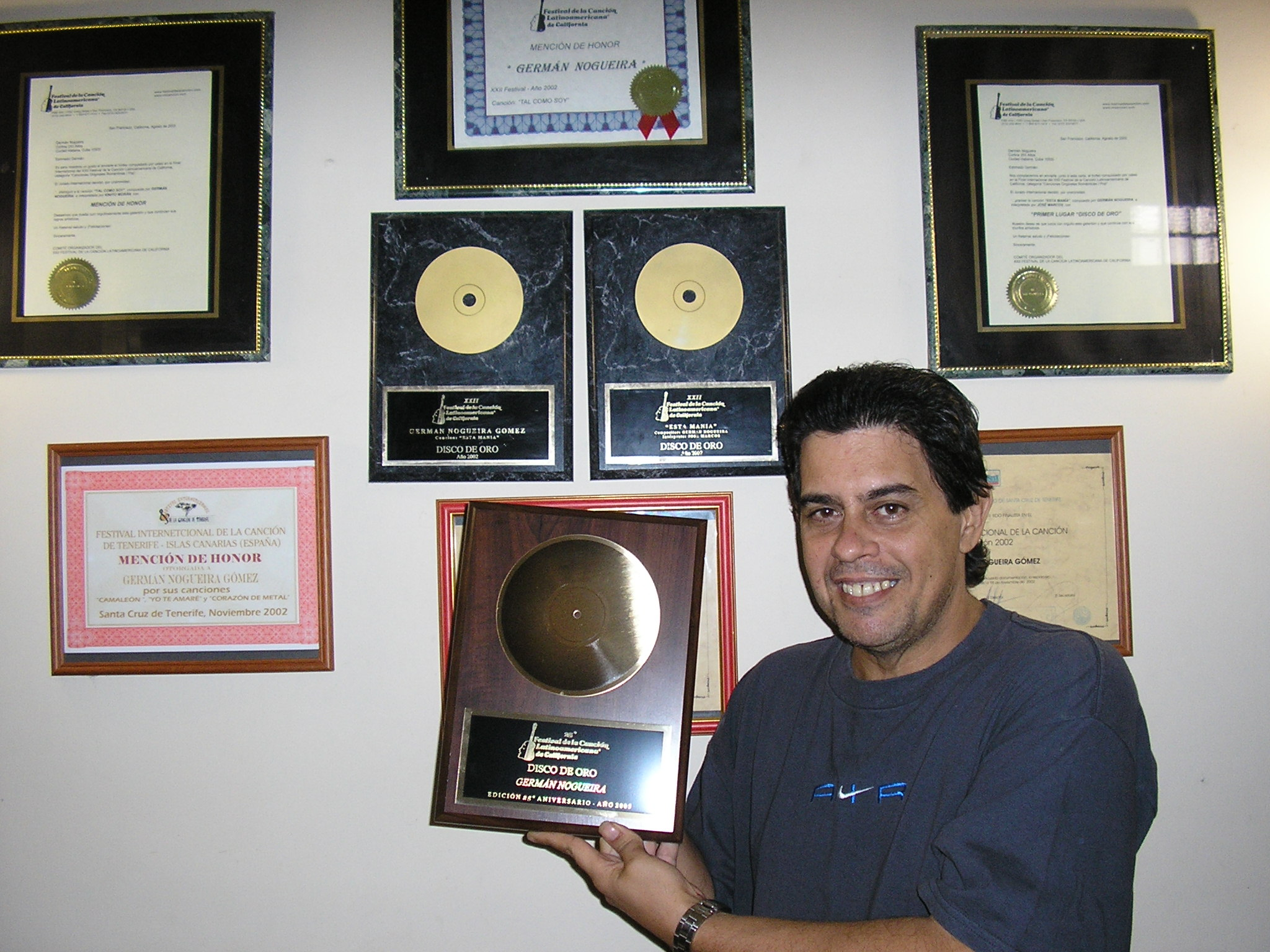

Background information
- Born: October 8, 1961 (age 64)
- Origin: Cuba
- Genres: Bachata, latin pop, pop, son, tropical
- Occupations: Songwriter, composer, producer
- Instrument: Guitar
- Years active: 1979 - present
- Website: http://www.germannogueira.net

Germán Nogueira Gómez (born October 8, 1961), is a Cuban author, composer and producer. He was born in Havana, Cuba. He has been the winner of several national and international music events. He is the author of many popular songs included in soloists’ discs launched by Cuban and international music distributors. He is the author of the song "Quema Tu Amor" performed by the Clippers and featured in the film Old Dogs (2009).

== Biography ==
Nogueira wrote his first poems and songs when he was 16 years old. He began his studies in music at this time choosing the guitar as his instrument. Being a teenager is part of the trio Ecstasy, taking part in different municipal and provincial events in Cuba interpreting his own songs.

He makes his national radio and TV debut in 1984 with his song Te pido interpreted by Pablo Rosquet.
