= Germain Kambinga =

Germain Kambinga is a Congolese politician. He was elected as a member of the National Assembly in 2011. He serves as the Minister of Industry for the Democratic Republic of the Congo.
