= Germán Trejo =

German Trejo

German Trejo is a Mexican-American political consultant and president of Battleground Solutions. The company serves Democratic candidates and progressive non-profit organizations.

== Early life ==
Trejo was born in Morelia, Mexico. He moved to the US in 1998, and attended Ohio State University, at first majoring in architecture, and later in political science and international studies. He graduated in 2004. At Ohio he was vice president of its Council of Hispanic Organization, an unsuccessful candidate for vice president of the Undergraduate Student Government, and co-chair of its Underrepresented Constituency Committee.

== Career ==
After graduating Trejo was appointed, from 2006–2009, to an unpaid position as consejero (adviser) to the Mexican government's Institute of Mexicans Abroad. He has worked in three presidential races: Wisconsin in 2004, Ohio in 2008, and Florida in 2012. In 2004 he served as the Hispanic Outreach Director in Wisconsin for the Kerry-Edwards campaign. As of 2007 he was the southeastern Ohio director of the Ohio Democratic Party.

Trejo was involved in 2009 in Centro Mexicano, a proposed community center in Columbus, Ohio. Trejo promoted the center's plans to house a Mexican consulate, a training center for Latinos, and a business services center targeting the Hispanic community. He presented the center as a nonprofit organization while trying to secure funding, though he had not incorporated it as a nonprofit with the state, and allegedly told investors that it was financially secure. Seven months after it was supposed to have opened, the center filed for Chapter 7 bankruptcy, listing $615 in assets and over $168,000 in debts.

In 2011 Trejo founded G&T Consulting, a political-consulting firm catering to Latino Democratic candidates. Since 2013 he has served as the president of Battleground Solutions. In 2013 he joined the board of Democracy Win.
