= Hervé de Portzmoguer =

Breton naval officer

Hervé de Portzmoguer (c. 1470 – 10 August 1512), also known as "Primauguet", was a Breton naval officer who was killed in action when his ship blew up at the Battle of Saint-Mathieu.

== Early life and military career ==
Hervé de Portzmoguer was born in Brittany c. 1470 into a Breton family. Upon coming of age, he joined the French navy and escorted merchant convoys, protecting them from attacks by pirates and enemy warships. His motto is said to have been War vor ha war zouar (Breton for "On sea and on land"). De Portzmoguer also plundered several foreign merchantmen in violation of French law, and in 1506 he was convicted of looting a Scottish merchant ship. Operation out of Morlaix, he attacked English merchantmen, which resulted in a complain from the English ambassador to France to Louis XII, who wrote that de Portzmoguer had captured and looted "more than thirty vessels". In retaliation, English forces under Admiral Edward Howard looted and burned de Portzmoguer's mansion in the spring of 1512.

== Death ==
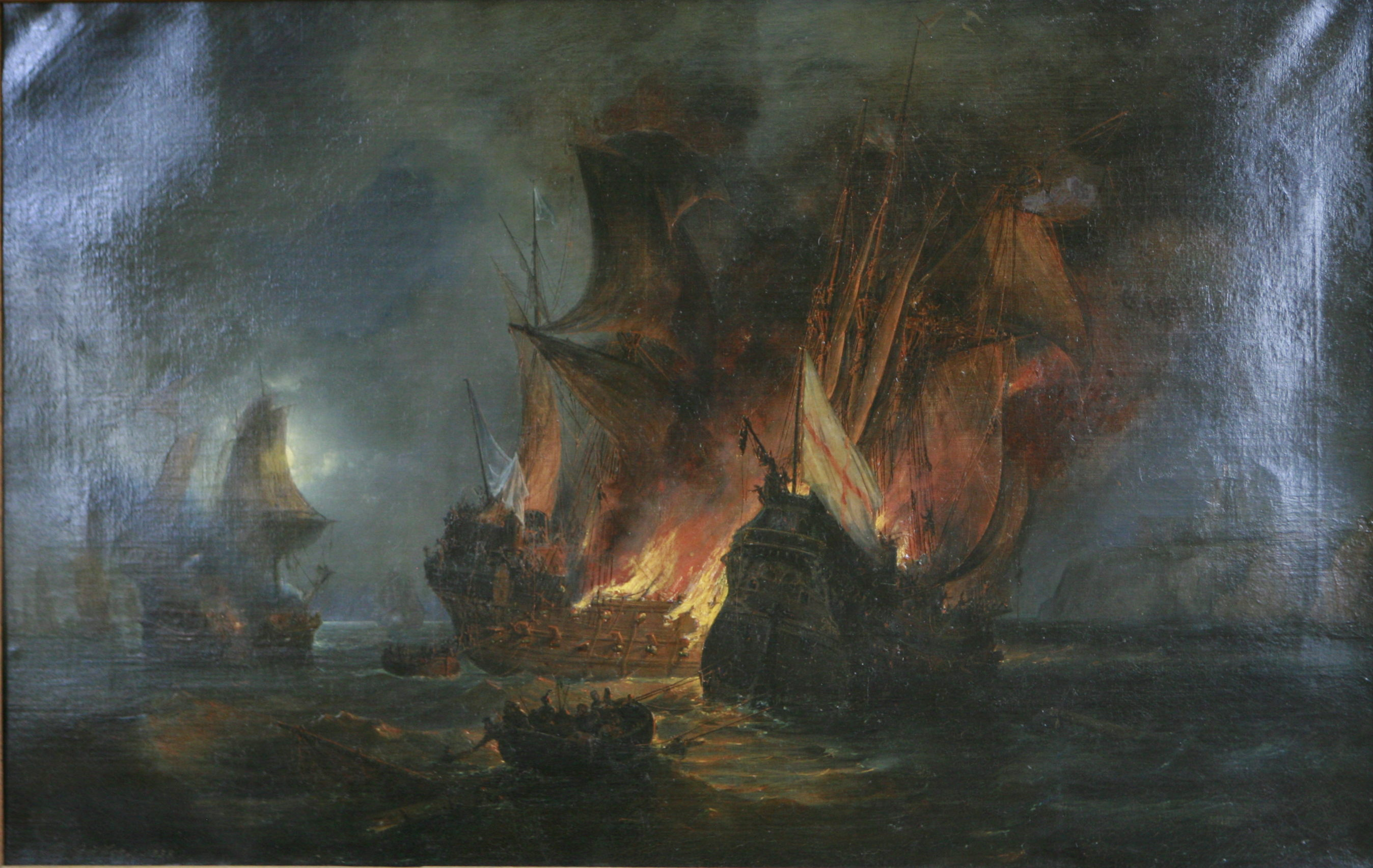
The sinking of the Cordelière and the Regent, painting by Pierre-Julien Gilbert, 1838.

On 10 August 1512, de Portzmoguer fought in the Battle of Saint-Mathieu against an English fleet under Howard. His ship, Marie de la Cordelière, blew up in a struggle with the English warship Regent, destroying both ships. Of the crew of Marie de la Cordelière, 1,230 were killed. The incident immediately became famous, and the French poet-scholar Germain de Brie wrote a Latin poem which portrayed de Portzmoguer in such a heroic light that English writer Thomas More attacked it mercilessly. In his epigrams addressed to de Brie, More ridiculed the poem's description of "Hervé fighting indiscriminately with four weapons and a shield; perhaps the fact slipped your mind, but your reader ought to have been informed in advance that Hervé had five hands."

The explosion that killed de Portzmoguer was subsequently portrayed as a deliberate act of self-sacrificing heroism. He is supposed to have said "Nous allons fêter saint Laurent qui périt par le feu!" ("We will celebrate the feast of Saint Lawrence, who died by fire!") before blowing up the ship to avoid its otherwise inevitable capture by the English. In fact there is no evidence that the explosion was intentional.

The Breton poet Théodore Botrel wrote a heroic poem about this version of the incident. Another heroic poem was written by Alan Simon in the song "Belle Marie de la Cordelière" for his 2008 rock opera Anne de Bretagne.

== French ships named for him ==
Six ships in the French Navy were named after him, using his gallicised nickname "Primauguet" - see French ship Primauguet.
