= Germain de Brie =

French Renaissance humanist scholar and poet (c. 1490–1538)

Germain de Brie (c. 1490 – 22 July 1538), sometimes Latinized as Germanus Brixius, was a French Renaissance humanist scholar and poet. He was closely associated with Erasmus and had a well-known literary feud with Thomas More.

== Early life ==
Germain de Brie was born in Auxerre, France, where he first studied law. He then travelled widely, becoming a college friend of Heinrich Cornelius Agrippa von Nettesheim. From 1508 he studied under Janus Lascaris in Venice, at this time becoming a friend of Erasmus of Rotterdam. He was secretary of the bishop of Albi, Lois de Amboise, and later of the French statesman Jean de Ganay.

After the death of Jean de Ganay in 1512, de Brie sought the patronage of the French queen Anne of Brittany, which he achieved by writing what became his most famous work, Chordigerae navis conflagratio ("The Burning of the Ship Cordelière") (1512), a Latin poem about the recent destruction of the Breton flagship Cordelière in the Battle of Saint-Mathieu between the French and English fleets. It was translated into French for Anne by Pierre Choque.

== Controversy with Thomas More ==
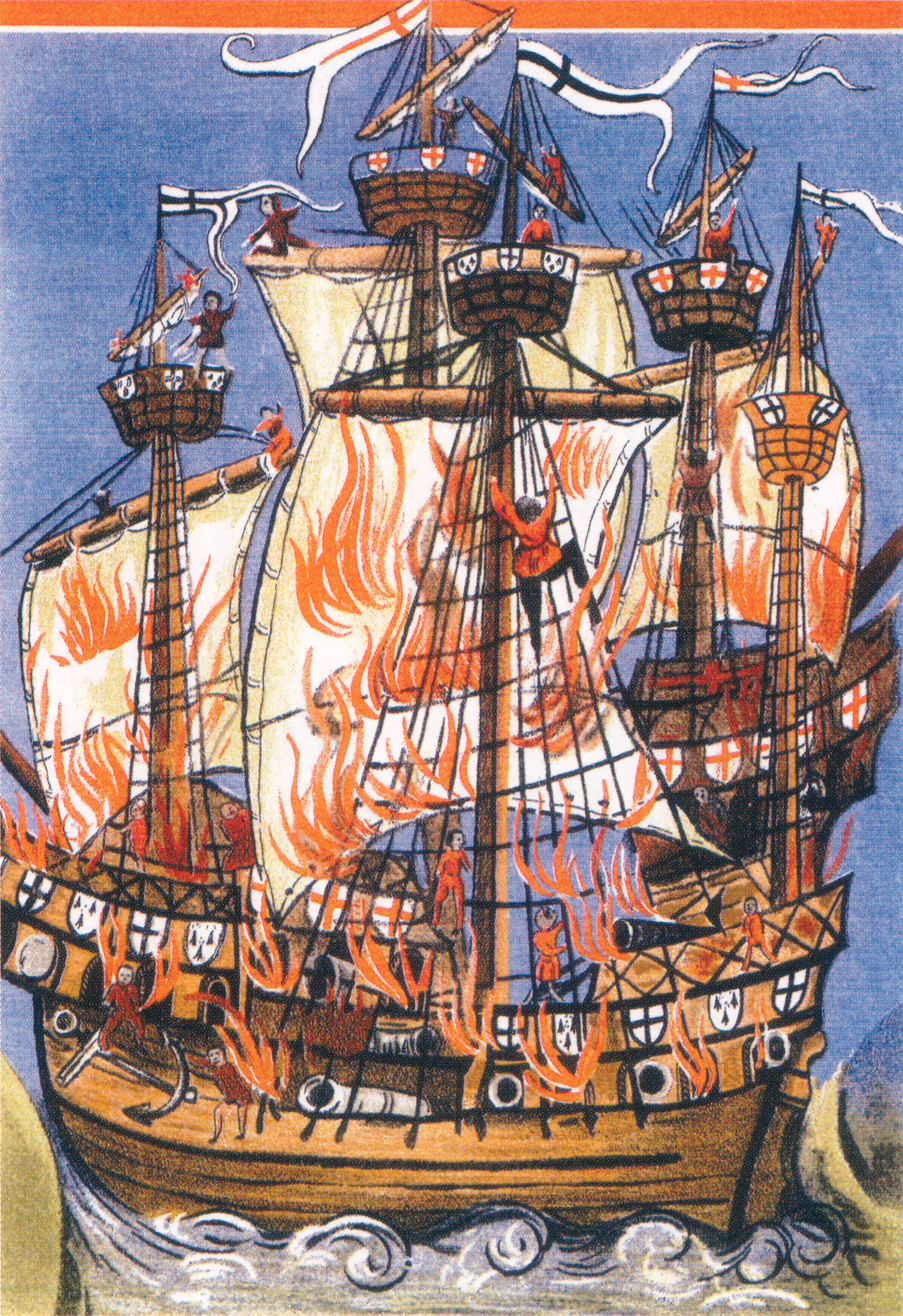
An illustration to de Brie's poem, depicting the Cordelière on fire, with the Regent behind.

The poem led to a literary controversy with the English scholar and statesman Sir Thomas More, in part because it contained criticisms of English leaders, but also because of its hyperbolic account of the bravery of the Breton captain Hervé de Portzmoguer. In his epigrams addressed to de Brie, More ridiculed the poem's description of "Hervé fighting indiscriminately with four weapons and a shield; perhaps the fact slipped your mind, but your reader ought to have been informed in advance that Hervé had five hands.

Stung by More's attacks, de Brie wrote an aggressive reply, the Latin verse satire Antimorus (1519), including an appendix which contained a "page-by-page listing of the mistakes in More's poems". Sir Thomas immediately wrote another hard-hitting pamphlet, Letter against Brixius, but Erasmus intervened to calm the situation, and persuaded More to stop the sale of the publication and let the matter drop.

== Later work ==
Appointed Archdeacon of Albi, de Brie also held other lucrative ecclesiastical posts along with the role of secretary to queen Anne and almoner to the king. In 1522 de Brie returned to the study of Greek. He began translating into Latin the writings of the Greek theologian John Chrysostom, whose work he wished to make more readily available. Erasmus assisted him in this. Later, de Brie intervened in quarrels between Erasmus and other scholars, notably Guillaume Budé, occasioned by the publication of Erasmus's Ciceronianus. In 1536 he wrote an appreciative obituary for Erasmus.

De Brie died in 1538.

== Works ==
- Chordigerae navis conflagratio. Paris 1513
- Antimorus. Paris 1519
- Epitaphien für Erasmus (entst.1536), in Catalogi duo operum Desiderii Erasmi. Basel 1537
