= Germania (disambiguation) =

Germania was the Roman term for the historical region in north-central Europe initially inhabited mainly by Germanic tribes.

Germania may also refer to:

== Arts and culture ==
- Germania (band), a project of the Slovenian group Laibach
- Germania (book), a historical and ethnographic work by Tacitus c. 98 AD
- a book on German culture by Simon Winder
- Germania (guild), artisan guilds in the Kingdom of Valencia in Spain
- Germania (opera), a 1902 opera by Alberto Franchetti
- Germania (personification), a figure representing the German nation or the Germans as whole
  - Germania (Philipp Veit), an allegorical painting made by Veit in 1834–1836
  - Germania (St. Paul's), another allegorical painting made in 1848, possibly also by Veit, located at St. Paul's Church, Frankfurt
- Germania (stamp), a definitive stamp design from 1900–1922 in Germany
- "Germania" (Beethoven), patriotic song by Ludwig van Beethoven
- Germania (German-American culture), aspects of German American culture

== Places ==
=== Antiquity ===
- Germania Antiqua, an abandoned province of the Roman Empire in Europe
- Germania Superior, a province of the Roman Empire in Europe
- Germania Inferior, a province of the Roman Empire in Europe
- Germania in Dacia, a Roman town, current-day Sapareva Banya, Bulgaria
- Germania in Numidia, an ancient city and Roman bishopric, in current-day Algeria

=== Modern ===
==== United States ====
- Germania, Michigan
- Germania Township, Todd County, Minnesota
- Germania, Missouri
- Germania, New Jersey
- Germania, Texas
- Germania, Wisconsin
- Germania, Iron County, Wisconsin
- Germania, Marquette County, Wisconsin
- Germania, Wyoming

==== Elsewhere ====
- Germania (city), also known as Welthauptstadt Germania, the projected renewal of Berlin, Germany during the Nazi period
- Germania, Ontario, Canada
- Germania District, Siquirres Canton, Costa Rica
- Germania Land, Greenland
- Germania, Djursholm, Sweden
- Germania, Buenos Aires, Argentina

== Sports ==
=== German football clubs ===
- BFC Germania 1888, from Berlin
- Germania Bieber
- Germania Bietigheim (disambiguation)
- Germania Bochum, defunct
- SC Germania 1899 Bremen, defunct
- Germania Breslau, defunct
- Germania Brötzingen
- 1. FC Germania Egestorf/Langreder
- VfL Germania 1894, from Frankfurt am Main
- FC Germania Friedrichstal
- VfB Germania Halberstadt
- Germania Kattowitz, defunct
- Mannheimer FG Germania 1897, defunct
- FC Germania 1899 Mühlhausen, now SV 1899 Mühlhausen
- 1. FC Germania 08 Ober-Roden
- DFC Germania Prag, defunct
- SV Germania Schöneiche
- FC Germania 06 Schwanheim
- Germania Teveren
- SG Germania Wiesbaden
- TSV Germania Windeck

=== Other uses in sports ===
- FC Germania Helsinki, a sports club in Finland
- SC Germânia, now Esporte Clube Pinheiros, in São Paulo, Brazil
- SC Germania List, a German rugby union club
- Germania F.V., a defunct Mexican football club
- Germania Königshütte, a former German football club, now Polish club AKS Chorzów

== Transportation ==
- Germania (ship), 1869–1891
- Germania (yacht), 1908–1930
- SS Germania, a number of steamships with this name
- FV Germania, a German trawler in service 1934–39 and as the vorpostenboot V 403 Germania and V 410 Germania 1939–44
- Germania (airline), a defunct German airline
- Germania Flug, now Chair Airlines, a Swiss airline

== People ==
- Germania Poleo (born 1994), Venezuelan journalist

== Other uses ==
- Germanía, the argot used by criminals or in jails in Spain during 15th and 16th centuries
- Germania Flugzeugwerke, a German aircraft manufacturer during World War I
  - Germania C.I
  - Germania C.IV
- Germanium dioxide or Germania, an inorganic compound
- Friedrich Krupp Germaniawerft (or Germaniawerft, 'Germania shipyard'), a former German shipbuilding company
- 5th SS Panzer Division "Wiking", originally SS-Division Germania
- 241 Germania, a main-belt asteroid

== See also ==
- Germania Building (disambiguation)
- Germanic (disambiguation)
- Germany (disambiguation)
- Germanicopolis (disambiguation)
- Germanicia, now Kahramanmaraş in Turkey
- Germaniciana, now in Tunisia
- Germanium, a chemical element
