= Germen =

Germen or Germin may refer to:

- A humorous term for Germans, the people of Germany.
- Germen, an archaic form of germ, meaning seed
- Xylophanes germen, a species of butterfly in Macroglossinae in Genus Xylophanes
- San Germen F.C., a team in the Club Atlético Independiente de La Chorrera
- Germin, or germabenzene, a heterocyclic compound

== People with the surname ==
- Gonzalez Germen (born 1987), Dominican baseball pitcher
- Mazhar Germen (1887–1967), Turkish physician, politician and women's rights activist
- Narcís Germen, a mayor of Girona
- Nur Germen (fl. 1971–1993), Turkish basketballer, Turkey national basketball team member
- Oya Germen (born 1953), Turkish image maker, television presenter and journalist

== People with the given name ==
- Germen Perry, author of book Albert Camus
- Germun LePig, British drummer of the band the Pork Dukes

== See also ==
- Garmin, a company that develops technologies for the Global Positioning System
- German (disambiguation)
- Germinal (disambiguation)
- Jermyn (disambiguation)
