= German people (disambiguation) =

German people may refer to:

- in terms of ethnicity: all ethnic Germans, in and outside of Germany
- in territorial terms: people of Germany, entire population of Germany, historical or modern
- in modern legal terms: all people who poses the citizenship of Germany

== Other uses ==
- German People's Party
- German People's Party (1868)
- German People's Party (Austria)
- German People's Party (Romania)
- German People's Group in Czecho-Slovakia
- German People's Congress
- German People's Council
- German People's Radio
- German People's Union
- German People's Union (Croatia)
- All-German People's Party
- Greater German People's Party
- German National People's Party

== See also ==
- German (disambiguation)
- Germany (disambiguation)
