= National Hotel =

National Hotel, or The National Hotel or variations, may refer to properties in:

- Australia:
  - National Hotel (Fremantle), in Western Australia
  - National Hotel, Warwick, in Queensland
  - Queensland National Hotel in Mount Morgan, Queensland
- Canada:
  - National Hotel (Toronto)
- Cuba:
  - Hotel Nacional de Cuba
- Moldova
  - National Hotel (Chișinău)
- Russia:
  - Hotel National, Moscow
- Taiwan:
  - National Hotel (Taiwan)
- The United States:
  - National Hotel (Nevada City, California)
  - National Hotel (Miami Beach, Florida)
  - National Hotel (St. Louis, Missouri)
  - National Hotel (Cuylerville, New York)
  - National Hotel (Washington, D.C.)
