= SS Germanic =

SS Germanic is the name of the following ships:

- SS Germanic (1874), scrapped in 1950
- SS Germanic (1881), wrecked November 1904 near Stag Island (Ontario) in the St. Clair River
- SS Germanic (1899), burned 30 March 1917 near her port Collingwood, Ontario
- SS Germanic (1936), sunk by U-48 on 29 March 1941

== See also ==
- Germanic (disambiguation)
