= Turnverein Building =

Turnverein Building may refer to various clubhouse and gymnasium buildings in the United States constructed for the Turners, including:

- Turnverein Building in San Antonio, Texas
- Turnverein Building in Denver, Colorado designed by George Louis Bettcher
- Germania Turnverein Building in Lancaster, Pennsylvania
- Independent Turnverein building in Indianapolis, Indiana
- South Side Turnverein Hall in Indianapolis, Indiana
- Athenæum (Das Deutsche Haus) in Indianapolis
- Turnverein Building in Portland Oregon, (now demolished) designed by Claussen and Claussen
- Turner Hall (Milwaukee) in Wisconsin
- Mission Turn Hall (now The Women's Building) in San Francisco, California
- Santa Clara Verein in Santa Clara, California

== See also ==
- Turners#Turner Halls
