= Germania Building (disambiguation) =

The Germania Building is a historic Beaux-Arts/Classical Revival building in Milwaukee, Wisconsin.

Germania Building may also refer to the following in the United States:

- Germania Bank Building (St. Paul), St. Paul, Minnesota
- Germania Bank Building (New York City)
- Germania Club Building, Chicago, Illinois
- Germania Turnverein Building, Lancaster, Pennsylvania
- Germania House, a hotel in St. Louis, Missouri
- Germania Building Complex in Ann Arbor, Michigan
- W New York Union Square, formerly the Germania Life Insurance Company Building, New York City

== See also ==
- Germania Club House
