= Atlantic Hotel =

Atlantic Hotel is the name of many hotels around the world:

== Germany ==
- Hotel Atlantic Kempinski, Hamburg

== Ireland ==
- Atlantic Hotel (Spanish Point, Ireland)

== United Kingdom ==
- Atlantic Hotel (Chelmsford)
- Atlantic Hotel (Glasgow)
- Atlantic Hotel (Jersey)
- Atlantic Hotel (Newquay)
- Atlantic Hotel (Porthcawl)
- Atlantic Hotel (Scilly Isles)
- Atlantic Hotel (Tenby)
- Grand Atlantic Hotel, Weston-super-Mare

== United States ==
- Atlantic Hotel, a hotel in St. Louis, Missouri
- Atlantic Hotel (Missoula, Montana)
- Atlantic Hotel, Norfolk, Virginia (demolished)
- Otis Hotel, also known as the Atlantic Hotel, Spokane, Washington

== Gambia ==
- Laico Atlantic Hotel, Banjul
