= German Reich =

Name for the German state (1871–1945)

German Reich (lit. 'German Empire' or 'German Realm', from German: Deutsches Reich) was the constitutional name for the German nation state that existed from 1871 to 1945. The Reich became understood as deriving its authority and sovereignty entirely from a continuing unitary German Volk ("national people"), with that authority and sovereignty being exercised at any one time over a unitary German "state territory" with variable boundaries and extent. Although commonly translated as "German Empire", the word Reich here better translates as "realm" or territorial "reach", in that the term does not in itself have monarchical connotations.

The name "German Reich" was officially proclaimed on 18 January 1871 at the Palace of Versailles by Otto von Bismarck and Wilhelm I of Prussia. After the annexation of Austria to Germany on 12–13 March 1938, the name Greater German Reich (German: Großdeutsches Reich) began to be used along with the official name "German Reich". According to the decree of the Chief of the Reich Chancellery Hans Lammers of 26 June 1943, the name "Greater German Reich" became mandatory in official documents.

The German Reich collapsed de facto with the death of Adolf Hitler on 30 April 1945, when the Allies decided not to recognise Karl Dönitz as the Reich President and to grant no legitimacy to the Flensburg Government he had formed. On 5 June 1945, the Allies signed the Berlin Declaration concerning the defeat of Germany, by which they established the Allied Control Council and assumed supreme authority over German territory.

The Federal Republic of Germany asserted, following its establishment on 23 May 1949, that [within its boundaries] it was a continuation of the German Reich, not just a successor state. Nevertheless, the Federal Republic did not maintain the specific title German Reich, and so consistently replaced the prefix Reichs- in all official titles and designations with Bundes- ("Federal"). Hence, for instance, the office of the Reichskanzler became the Bundeskanzler. Following German reunification on 3 October 1990, the expanded Federal Republic describes itself as "United Germany", emphasizing that it does not now recognize any territories once included in the former German Reich outside its boundaries as having a valid claim to be a part of Germany as a whole.

== Use ==
In referring to the entire period between 1871 and 1945, the partially translated English phrase "German Reich" (/-ˈraɪk/) is applied by historians in formal contexts; although in common English usage this state was and is known simply as Germany, the English term "German Empire" is reserved to denote the German state between 1871 and 1918.

The history of the nation state known as the German Reich is commonly divided into three periods:

- German Empire (1871–1918)
- Weimar Republic (1918–1933)
- Nazi Germany (1933–1945)

National flag from 1871–1919

National flag from 1919–1933

National flag from 1933–1935

National flag from 1935–1945

However, the term Deutsches Reich as well as Das Reich (the realm) dates back earlier than all of this. It was inconsistently applied in contemporary maps to the Holy Roman Empire (962–1806), also called the "Holy Roman Empire of the German Nation" from 1512. The Holy Roman Empire however was not exclusively German-speaking but constituted a supranational entity extending beyond the frontiers of the German language area (Sprachraum) that during the Middle Ages was intermittently known as the Kingdom of Germany.

The first attempt to re-establish a "German Empire" during the 1848 March Revolution by the Frankfurt Constitution ultimately failed: it was aborted by the monarchs of the German Confederation, especially by the Prussian aristocracy and the King of Prussia himself, which opposed German nationalism, as then was associated with the idea of popular sovereignty.

A 1923 book entitled Das Dritte Reich by Arthur Moeller van den Bruck counted the medieval Holy Roman Empire as the first, and the 1871–1918 monarchy as the second, which was then to be followed by a "reinvigorated" third one. Subsequently, the Nazi regime was (unofficially) called the "Third Reich"; this usage was sometimes contemporaneous, but mostly retrospective and applied by non-Germans.

Following the Anschluss annexation of Austria in 1938, Nazi Germany informally named itself the Greater German Reich (German: Großdeutsches Reich). This name was made the official state name only during the last two years (1943–1945) of Nazi rule under Adolf Hitler, although the change was never proclaimed. After World War II, the denotation "German Reich" quickly fell into disuse in Allied-occupied Germany, however, and the state's continued existence remained a matter of debate; the post-war Bonn Republic maintained the continued existence of the German Reich as an 'overall state", but dormant while East and West Germany continued to be divided. Nevertheless, when Germany was reunited in 1990 the term "German Reich" was not revived as a title for the Berlin Republic.

== Difference between "Reich" and "Empire" ==
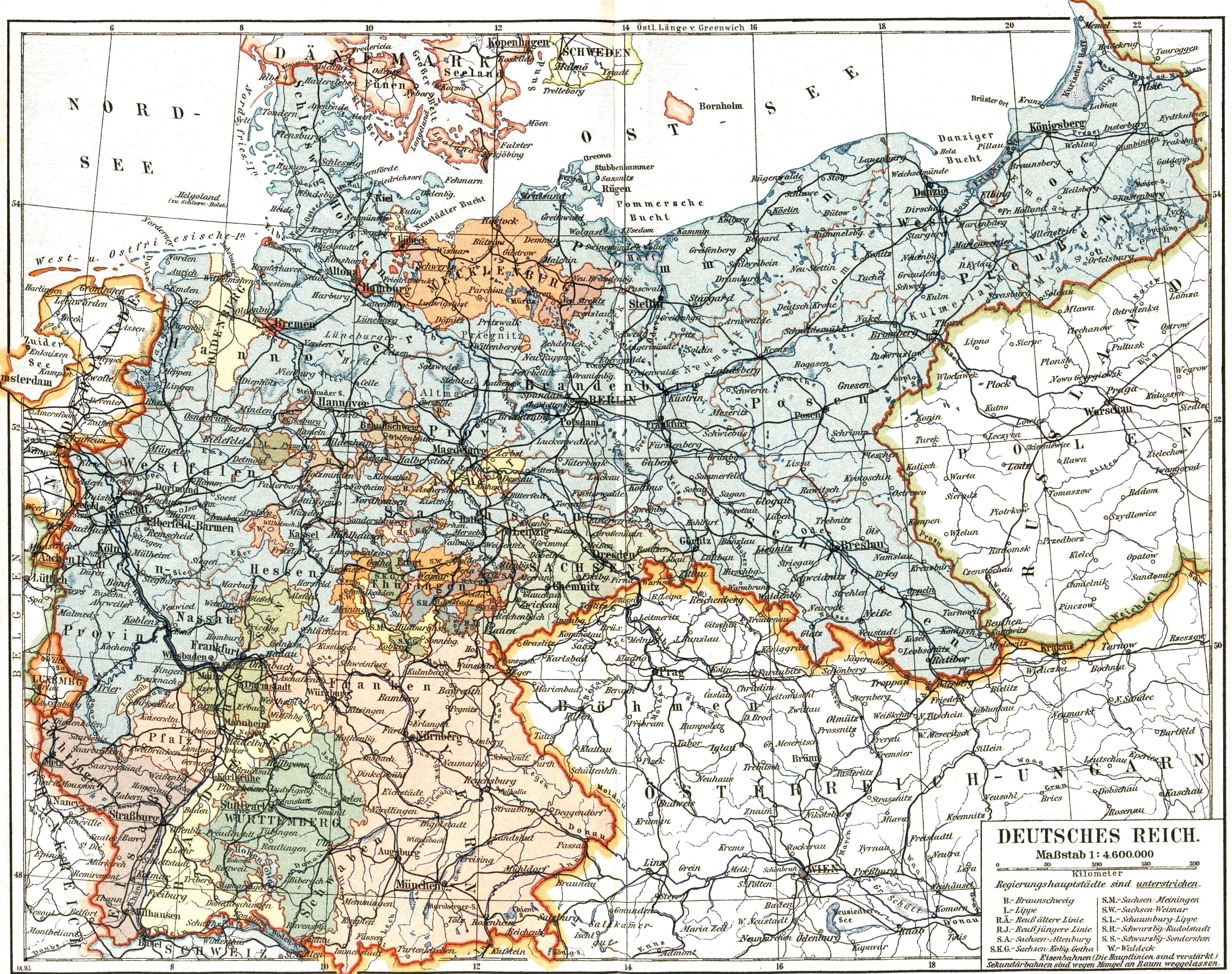
Deutsches Reich, 1893 map

European territory occupied by Nazi Germany and its allies at its greatest extent in 1942. The German Reich is shown in the darkest blue.

The German word Reich translates to the English word "empire"; it also translates to such words as "realm" or "domain." However, this translation was not used throughout the full existence of the German Reich. Historically, only Germany from 1871 to 1918—when Germany was under the rule of an emperor (Kaiser)—is known in English as the "German Empire" (Deutsches Kaiserreich in German historiography), while the term "German Reich" describes Germany from 1871 to 1945. As the literal translation "German Empire" denotes a monarchy, the term is used only in reference to Germany before the fall of the monarchy at the end of World War I in 1918.

After the unification of Germany, under the reign of the Prussian king Wilhelm I and his Chancellor Otto von Bismarck, the historic German states (e.g. Bavaria and Saxony) were united with Prussia under imperial rule, by the Hohenzollern dynasty. On 18 January 1871, Wilhelm I was proclaimed "German Emperor" at the Hall of Mirrors in Versailles, the German Reich was officially declared Deutsches Reich, or "German Empire", explicitly harking back to the extinct Holy Roman Empire. The title "German Emperor" was a compromise; Wilhelm I had wanted the title of "Emperor of Germany", but Bismarck refused this, so as to avoid implying a claim to extended monarchical authority over non-Prussian German kingdoms. On 14 April 1871, the Reichstag parliament passed the Constitution of the German Empire (Verfassung des Deutschen Reiches), which was published two days later.

However, originating from the North German Confederation, the Empire never comprised all "German" lands; as it excluded Luxembourg, and those Cisleithanian crown lands of Austria-Hungary which had been part of the former German Confederation until 1865. Moreover, it included the whole of the Kingdom of Prussia, the eastern parts of which had never been included in historic German lands. The unification under Prussian leadership manifested Bismarck's "Lesser German" solution of the German question after the Austro-Prussian War of 1866, realised with the support of his national liberal allies. On the other hand, the German Reich of 1871 comprised extended Prussian territories with large non-German sections of the population, like Posen, West Prussia or Schleswig, and also territories with predominantly German populations which had never been constitutionally "German" (Holy Roman), such as East Prussia.

Bismarck was otherwise unable, however, to avoid the term German Reich acquiring connotations from the English term "empire" or the Dutch term "rijk" in the context of German colonial expansion during the New Imperialism period. Following in the example of other European colonial empires, Imperial Germany (against Bismarck's intentions) started to rapidly acquire overseas colonies, including possessions in Africa, Oceania and China; the Imperial German Navy underwent a rapid expansion concurrently to protect these new colonies. At the same time strong Pan-Germanic political forces emerged, pressing for the borders of the Reich to be extended into a multiethnic German-led Central European empire, emulating and rivalling Imperial Russia to the east.

Before and during the events of World War I, the German state was called an "empire" in English and Wilhelm II was titled "His Imperial and Royal Majesty the German Emperor." After the War and the abolition of the monarchy during the German revolution of 1918–1919, however, when Wilhelm was forced to abdicate, the official English name for Germany was the "German Reich": Reich was left untranslated and no longer referred to an "empire" but, instead, took on the connotation of "Realm" or "State", its original (1871) definition. "German Reich" was used in legal documents and English-language international treaties—for example, the Kellogg–Briand Pact and the Geneva Conventions.

Apart from official documents, post-World War I Germany was referred to as the "German Reich"—never as the "German Empire"—for example, by British politicians—and in the aftermath of World War II the word "Reich" was used untranslated by Allied prosecutors throughout the Nuremberg Trials, with "German Empire" only used to describe Germany before it became a federal republic in 1918.

== Reich as "national people" versus Reich as "state territory" ==
At the 1871 Unification of Germany (aside from Austria), the Reich was established constitutionally as a federation of monarchies, each having entered the federation with a defined territory; and consequently the unitary nationalism of the 'German Reich' was initially specified (at Article 1 of the 1871 constitution) in territorial terms, as the lands within the former boundaries of this particular subset of German monarchies. This geographical understanding of the Reich became steadily superseded in the period up to the first World War by an understanding of the German Reich as a unitary nation state identified with the German national people according to the principle of jus sanguinis, and drawing on the rhetoric of "the sovereignty of the nation" in the Frankfurt Constitution—albeit that many ethnic "Germans" (as with the German-speaking peoples of Austria) remained outside the national people constituting the German Empire of 1871 and also that the Empire of 1871 included extensive territories (such as Posen) with predominantly non-German populations. This transition became formalised in the constitution of the Weimar Republic, where Article 1 identifies the Reich as deriving its authority from the German national people, while Article 2 identifies the state territory under the Reich as the lands which, at the time of the constitution's adoption, were within the authority of the German state. The identity of Reich and people ran both ways—not only did the institutions of the German state derive their legitimacy from the German people, so, too, the German people derived their inherent identity and patriotic duties from their being collectively constituted as an organ and institution of the German Reich. Subsequently, the term "German Reich" continued to be applied both as identifying with the national people, and also with the state territory; but increasingly, the application of the term to the German national people came to be seen as primary. Following the Second World War, the term "German Reich" fell out of use in constitutional formulations, being replaced by the term "nation as a whole", as applied to denote the state as a totality of the German national people; and the term "Germany as a whole", as applied to denote the state as a totality of German national territory.

== Nazi perspective on the Weimar Republic ==
Territories lost by the German Empire at the conclusion of World War I Administered by the League of Nations Annexed or transferred to neighbouring countries by the treaty, or later via plebiscite and League of Nations action Weimar Germany

The 1918–1933 republic, which was also called the German Reich, was ignored and denounced by the Nazis as a historical aberration. The name "Weimar Republic" was first used in 1929 after Hitler referred to the period as the "Republik von Weimar" (Republic of Weimar, after the city (Weimar) which held its constitutional assembly) at a rally in Munich with the term later becoming mainstream during the 1930s both within and outside Germany. The Nazis also contemptuously referred to it as "the System".

== Fall of the Third Reich ==
Territories lost by Germany after World War II.

On 8 May 1945, with the capitulation of the German armed forces, the supreme command of the Wehrmacht was handed over to the Allies. The Allies refused to recognise Karl Dönitz as Reichspräsident or to recognise the legitimacy of his Flensburg Government (so-called because it was based at Flensburg and controlled only a small area around the town) and, on 5 June 1945, the four powers signed the Berlin Declaration and assumed de jure supreme authority with respect to Germany. The declaration confirmed the complete legal extinction of the Third Reich with the death of Adolf Hitler on 30 April 1945, but asserted the continued subsequent existence of a German people and a German national territory; although subject to the four signatory powers also asserting their authority to determine the future boundaries of Germany.

At the Potsdam Conference, Allied-occupied Germany was defined as comprising "Germany as a whole"; and was divided into British, French, American and Soviet occupation zones; while the Allied Powers exercised the state authority assumed by the Berlin Declaration in transferring the former eastern territories of the German Reich east of the Oder–Neisse line to the Republic of Poland and the Soviet Union.

== Divided Germany ==
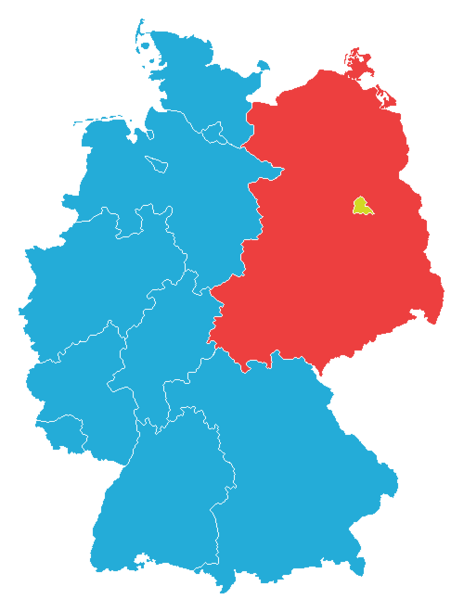
West Germany (blue), East Germany (red) and West Berlin (yellow)

In 1973, in a review of the previous year's Basic Treaty between East and West Germany, the German Federal Constitutional Court (Bundesverfassungsgericht) ruled that according to the Basic Law of the Federal Republic of Germany the German Reich had outlasted the collapse in 1945, and hence had continued to exist as an "overall state", albeit one not itself capable of action. The court ruled that since 1949 the Federal Republic (FRG) had been partially identical with the German Reich and not merely its successor. The court further elaborated that the 'partial identity' of the FRG was limited to apply only within its current de facto territory; and hence the Federal Republic could not claim an exclusive mandate for the territory of the Reich then under the de facto government of the German Democratic Republic; "identity does not require exclusivity". This was explained as being because the German Democratic Republic was beyond FRG authority and because the Allied powers still had jurisdiction where "Germany as a whole" was concerned. Nevertheless, the Court insisted that within the territory of the Federal Republic, the GDR could only be considered as one de jure German state amongst others, on the analogy of the pre-existing de jure German states that in 1949 had come together as the Federal Republic; and hence, like them, could never be accorded by the organs of the Federal Republic full recognition as a state in international law; even though the Federal Constitutional Court recognised that, within international law, the GDR was indeed an independent sovereign state. The constitutional status of the GDR under the Basic Law still differed from that of the Länder of the Federal Republic, in that the GDR had not declared its accession to the Basic Law; but the Constitutional Court maintained that the Basic Treaty was consistent with the GDR declaring its accession at some time in the future in accordance with its own constitution; and hence the Court determined that in recognising the GDR as a de jure German State, the Basic Treaty could be interpreted as facilitating the reunification of the German Reich (as indeed it eventually did). So long as any de jure German state remained separated from the rest, the German Reich could continue to exist only in suspension; but should the GDR be reunited with the Federal Republic, the Reich would once more be fully capable of action as a sovereign state.

"In Article 6 the Contracting Parties agree that they shall base themselves on the principle that the sovereign power of each of the two States be confined to its State territory and that they will respect the independence and autonomy of each of the two States in domestic and foreign affairs. This agreement too is compatible with the Basic Law only if interpreted to the effect that for the Federal Republic of Germany the basis of this Treaty is the continued existence of Germany, which has according to the Basic Law to be recognized as a State (albeit not organized and therefore not capable of action), and that accordingly the mutual restriction of sovereign power to the territory of the State and respect for the independence and autonomy of each of the two States in domestic and foreign affairs has its reference to the special situation in which both States find themselves vis-à-vis each other as sub-States of Germany as a whole."

After 1973, however, the claimed identity of the Federal Republic with the German Reich was not recognised by most other countries of the world. The Soviet Union, the three Western allies, and most other Western countries regarded the German Reich as still being one nation—not synonymous with either the West or East German state but rather the two states in collective. Other countries tended to regard the German Reich as having been divided into two distinct states in international law, and accordingly accorded both states full diplomatic recognition. As of 1974, East Germany's official stance was that the GDR was a new state that is German in nature, a successor of the German Reich, and that there were then two German states that were different nations.

== Reunified Germany ==
When the Treaty on the Final Settlement with Respect to Germany between Germany and the wartime Allies was signed on 12 September 1990, there was no mention of the term Deutsches Reich, however the Allies paraphrased the international legal personality of Germany as "Germany as a whole" in the English version of the text. Instead the states of the Federal Republic of Germany (West Germany, FRG) and the German Democratic Republic (East Germany, GDR) agreed to be bound by certain conditions which they had to ratify, one of which was the recognising the reunification of East Germany, West Germany and Berlin as constituting the full achievement of a united Germany. On meeting these conditions under Article 7.2 "The United Germany [has] accordingly full sovereignty over its internal and external affairs."

Under Article 1 of the Treaty on Final Settlement, the new united Germany committed itself to renouncing any further territorial claims beyond the boundaries of East Germany, West Germany and Berlin; "The united Germany has no territorial claims whatsoever against other states and shall not assert any in the future." Furthermore, the Basic Law of the Federal Republic was required to be amended to state explicitly that full German unification had now been achieved, such that the new German state comprised the entirety of Germany, and that all constitutional mechanisms should be removed by which any territories outside those boundaries could otherwise subsequently be admitted; these amendments being bound by treaty not to be revoked. Article 23 of the Basic Law was repealed, closing off the possibility for any further states to apply for membership of the Federal Republic; while Article 146 was amended to state explicitly that the territory of the newly unified republic comprised the entirety of the German people; "This Basic Law, which since the achievement of the unity and freedom of Germany applies to the entire German people, shall cease to apply on the day on which a constitution freely adopted by the German people takes effect". This was confirmed in the 1990 rewording of the preamble; "Germans..have achieved the unity and freedom of Germany in free self-determination. This Basic Law thus applies to the entire German people." In place of the former Article 23 under which the former GDR had declared its accession to the Federal Republic, a new Article 23 embedded the accession of the Federal Republic to the European Union within the Basic Law; hence with the subsequent accession of Poland to the EU, the constitutional bar on pursuing any claim to territories beyond the Oder–Neisse line was reinforced. Insofar as the German Reich may be claimed to continue in existence as 'Germany as a whole', the former eastern territories of Germany in Poland or Russia, and the western territories, such as the East Cantons or Alsace–Lorraine, are now definitively and permanently excluded from ever again being united within this Reich under the Basic Law.

Hence, although the GDR had by the Volkskammer's declaration of accession to the Federal Republic, initiated the process of reunification; the act of reunification itself (with its many specific terms and conditions; including the fundamental amendments to the Basic Law required by the Treaty of Final Settlement) was achieved constitutionally by the subsequent Unification Treaty of 31 August 1990; that is through a binding agreement between the former GDR and the Federal Republic now recognising each another as separate sovereign states in international law. This treaty was then voted into effect by both the Volkskammer and the Bundestag by the constitutionally required two-thirds majorities; effecting on the one hand, the extinction of the GDR, and on the other, the agreed amendments to the Basic Law of the Federal Republic. Hence, although the GDR had nominally declared its accession to the Federal Republic under Article 23 of the Basic Law, this did not imply its acceptance of the Basic Law as it then stood; but rather of the Basic Law as subsequently amended in line with the Unification Treaty and the Treaty of Final Settlement. These amendments had the effect of removing all those clauses by which the Federal Constitutional Court had formerly maintained the identity of the Federal Republic with the historic 'German Reich', specifically including the very Article 23 that had provided the basis for the Volkskammer's declaration of accession.

== See also ==
- National colours of Germany
- Germany (disambiguation)
- German Empire (1848–49)
- Greater Germanic Reich, a conceptual entity that the Nazis planned to establish during World War II
