= Germany Valley (Georgia) =

Valley in Georgia, United States

Germany Valley, Georgia
- Unincorporated Place
- Location within Georgia
- Coordinates: 34°53′45″N 83°27′59″W
- Country: United States
- State: Georgia
- County: Rabun
- Elevation: 3,500 ft (1,100 m)
- Time zone: UTC-5 (Eastern (EST))
  - Summer (DST): UTC-4 (EDT)
- ZIP code: 30525
- GNIS feature ID: 331805

Germany Valley, located in Rabun County in the U.S. state of Georgia, four miles northwest of Clayton, is a gently sloping valley surrounded by Blue Ridge Mountain peaks. The Germany community is often referred to by local residents as "Germany Mountain," although there is actually no named peak in the area by that name.

At an elevation of approximately 2,600 feet (790 m), Germany is generally considered the third highest mountain valley in the state, after Sky Valley (3,140 feet [960 m]), also in Rabun County, and the Suches community (2,800 feet [850 m]) in Union County. Germany Valley is approximately 3/4 mile (1.2 km) wide and almost 2 miles (3.2 km) long and consists mostly of pastureland and small farms with cattle and horses. Forestland, much of it owned by the United States Forest Service, surrounds the valley. Several wooded hills rise 100–150 feet (30–46 m) above the valley floor.

Germany Valley is framed by numerous mountain peaks. Big Face (3,541 feet [1,079 m]) rises above the valley's southern edge and dominates most valley vistas. Billy Mountain, at 3,243 feet (988 m), and 3,250-foot (990 m) Elisha Mountain—both of which sit along the Eastern Continental Divide—rise less dramatically to the north. Also on the Eastern Continental Divide is 3,640-foot (1,110 m) Black Rock Mountain at the eastern end of the valley, which is the centerpiece of Georgia's highest state park. Perhaps the best views of Germany Valley are from the park's Tennessee Rock Overlook.

Because of its altitude, Germany Valley experiences a significantly cooler climate than surrounding mountain valleys. Daily weather data are recorded by the National Weather Service's Germany Valley cooperative observation station. Weather data over the years 2012–17 reflected an average daily high temperature in July of 79 °F (26 °C). The highest temperature during that period was 94 °F (34 °C) on July 2, 2012, which was the most recent day that the weather station recorded a reading in the 90s. The average high temperature in January during the period was 46 °F (8 °C). Low temperatures in the teens are not uncommon, and single-digit lows occasionally occur. Temperatures below zero are less common and do not occur every winter. The coldest reading during the 2012–17 period was −4 °F (−20 °C) on January 7, 2014.

Precipitation in the valley is plentiful, as it is across much of the southern Appalachians. The Germany Valley station averages about 80 inches (2,000 mm) of rain per year. 2018 was especially wet, when the station measured 116.48 inches of precipitation, the second-most rainfall at a specific location in state history. In 2020, the Germany Valley NWS station reported a yearly precipitation total of 100.19 inches. Snowfall is somewhat sporadic in the valley but occurs a number of times each winter. Snowfall averages approximately 12 inches (300 mm) a year.

Germany Valley is drained by southwest-flowing Timpson Creek, which flows into the Timpson Cove arm of Lake Burton, the uppermost of five Georgia Power reservoirs on the Tallulah River, one of the northernmost watersheds in the Savannah River basin.
