= Armonai =

Village in Lithuania

- Village
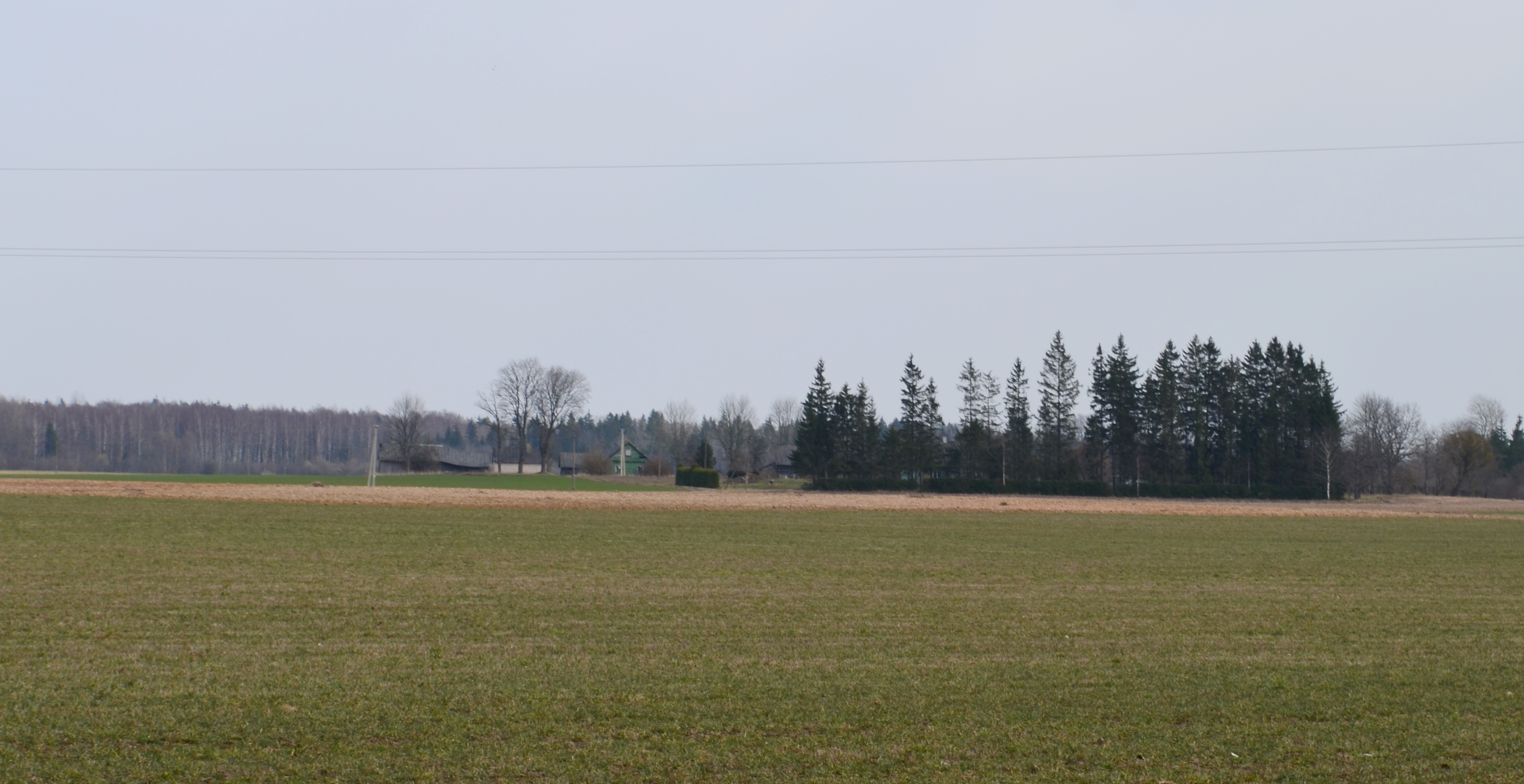

- Location within Lithuania
- Coordinates: 55°24′50″N 23°16′48″E
- Country: Lithuania
- County: Kaunas County
- Municipality: Raseiniai District Municipality
- Eldership: Betygala Eldership

Population (2011)
  - Total: 9
- Time zone: UTC+2 (EET)
  - Summer (DST): UTC+3 (EEST)

Armonai (Polish: Germany) is a village in the Betygala Eldership, Raseiniai District Municipality, Kaunas County, in central Lithuania.
