= Germanic =

Germanic may refer to:

- Germanic peoples, an ethno-linguistic group identified by their use of the Germanic languages
  - List of ancient Germanic peoples and tribes
- Germanic languages

- Proto-Germanic language, a reconstructed proto-language of all the Germanic languages

- Germanic name
- Germanic mythology, myths associated with Germanic paganism
- Germanic religion (disambiguation)
- SS Germanic (1874), a White Star Line steamship

== See also ==
- Germania (disambiguation)
- Germanus (disambiguation)
- German (disambiguation)
- Germanicia Caesarea
