= Germany (disambiguation) =

Germany (officially the Federal Republic of Germany) is a country in Central Europe.

Germany may also refer to:

== Other political entities ==
- Historical entities:
  - Kingdom of Germany (medieval)
  - Holy Roman Empire
  - German Confederation (1815–1848, 1850–1866)
  - German Empire (1848–1849)
  - North German Confederation (1866–1871)
  - German Empire (1871–1918)
  - Weimar Republic (1918–1933)
  - Nazi Germany (1933–1945)
  - West Germany, officially the Federal Republic of Germany
  - East Germany, officially the German Democratic Republic
- Germany (European Parliament constituency), the constituency for the election of the European Parliament

== People ==
=== Nickname ===
- Maurice E. Curts (1898–1976), United States Navy four-star admiral and commander-in-chief of the United States Pacific Fleet
- Germany Schaefer (1876–1919), Major League Baseball player
- Germany Schulz (1883–1951), All-American football player for the University of Michigan
- Germany Smith (1863–1927), Major League Baseball player

=== Surname ===
- Jim Germany (born 1953), Canadian Football League player
- Reggie Germany (born 1978), National Football League player
- Willie Germany (born 1948), National Football League player

== Places ==
- Germany, Texas, US
- Germany Township, Pennsylvania, US
- Germany Valley, West Virginia, US
- Germany Valley (Georgia), US
- Germany, Polish name of Armonai, village in Lithuania

== Other uses ==
- Germany (horse) (1991–2013), a thoroughbred racehorse
- "Germany", a QI episode

== See also ==
- Names of Germany
- German (disambiguation)
- Germania (disambiguation)
- Deutschland (disambiguation) – where Deutschland is the German word for "Germany"
