= Henry Simpson (Toronto) =

Canadian architect

- Born: 1864
- Died: 1926 (aged 61–62); Toronto, Ontario, Canada
- Occupation: architect

Henry Simpson (1864–1926) was an architect active in Toronto, Ontario, Canada, around the turn of the 20th century. Simpson trained under prominent architect E.J. Lennox, and the buildings he designed were in the Richardsonian Romanesque style Lennox had helped popularize. He was one of the architects employed by the prominent Massey family, well-known philanthropists. Simpson worked with Charles J. Gibson from 1888 to 1890.

Over a dozen buildings he designed have survived to the present day. According to the Biographical Dictionary of Architects in Canada Simpson played a role in the design of 126 buildings from 1891 to 1916.

== Simpson's buildings that have survived to the 21st Century ==
Buildings Henry Simpson designed that survived into the 21st Century
known as	address	image	completed	notes
A.M. Orpen House	380 Sherbourne Street		1900	
465 Broadview Ave	465 Broadview Ave		1908	Built for the Toronto Drugist A.E. Walton along with some of Walton’s stores
Edward McNamara Building	857 King Street West		1903	A set of rowhouses at 857-879 King Street West
J.F. Brown Furniture Building	193 Yonge Street		1903	
Parisian Laundry Building	602 King Street West		1904	
161 Crescent Road	161 Crescent Road		1905	
Bradshaw & Company Factory	107 Atlantic Avenue		1905	
National Hotel, Toronto	251 King Street East		1905	The hotel was built in 1868 and Simpson was responsible for a 1905 expansion and renovation.
Aluminum & Crown Stopper Company	334 King Street East		1908	Simpson was responsible for the north wing—on Parliament
The Strand Hotel	75 Victoria Street		1908	
Castlemere Apartments	75 Crescent Road		1912	Tudor revival
7 Triller Avenue	7 Triller Avenue		1912	
Brunswick-Balke-Collender Factory Boiler House	40 Hanna Avenue		1913	
Brunswick-Balke-Collender Factory Building	40 Hanna Avenue		1913	
Hester Drummond House	230 Royal York Road		1890	Designed by Gibson and Simpson
