= Germania (Beethoven) =

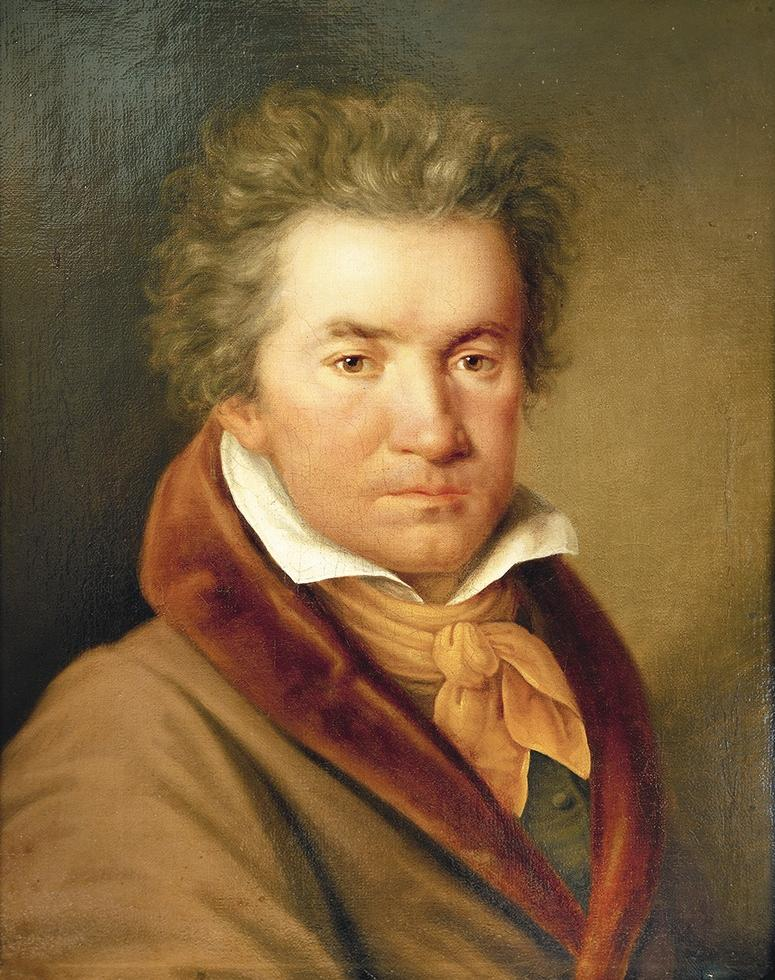
Ludwig van Beethoven (age 44) depicted in a portrait by Joseph Willibrord Mähler (1815)

"Germania", WoO 94, is a patriotic song by Ludwig van Beethoven written in order to celebrate the victory against Napoleon.

== History ==
During and after the defeat of Napoleon during the Wars of Liberation, German patriotism flourished and spurred the production of poems, plays, and songs exalting the nation. Among these German artists who contributed to the glorification of their country was Friedrich Treitschke. In 1814, he wrote a patriotic opera, Die gute Nachricht, to which several Viennese composers contributed music. Beethoven composed the music for the closing song, in B-flat major, celebrating Germania, the allegory of Germany. The work was first performed on 11 April 1814 in the Theater am Kärntnertor in Vienna. It is written for a baritone solo (the role of Bruno), SATB chorus, 2 flutes, 2 oboes, 2 clarinets, 2 bassoons, 2 French horns, 2 trumpets, timpani, and a string section.

Beethoven's own patriotic motivation is illustrated in the following letter he wrote about his participation in a charity concert for the soldiers of the preceding war:

It was a rare assembly of outstanding artists, in which each one, inspired by the sole thought of contributing by his art something for the benefit of the Fatherland, worked together without thought of rank and in subordinate positions to bring about an outstanding performance. ... The leadership of the whole assemblage fell to me only because the music was of my composition. Had it been by someone else, I should have been as willing as Hr. Hummel to take my place at the great drum, since we were all filled solely with the purest feeling of love for the Fatherland and with the joy of giving of our powers for those who had given so greatly for us.	Es war ein seltener Verein vorzüglicher Tonkünstler, worin ein jeder einzig durch den Gedanken begeistert war, mit seiner Kunst auch etwas zum Nutzen des Vaterlandes beitragen zu können, und ohne alle Rangordnung, auch auf untergeordneten Plätzen zur vortrefflichen Ausführung des Ganzen mitwirkte ... Mir fiel nur darum die Leitung des Ganzen zu, weil die Musik von meiner Komposition war; wäre sie von einem Anderm gewesen, so würde ich mich eben so gern wie Herr Hummel an die grosse Trommel gestellt haben, da uns alle nichts als das reine Gefühl der Vaterlandsliebe und des freudigen Opfers unserer Kräfte für diejenigen, die uns so viel geopfert haben, erfüllte.

== Lyrics ==
German	
1. Germania, Germania, Wie stehst du jetzt im Glanze da. Zwar zogen Nebel um dein Haupt, Die alte Sonne schien geraubt, Doch Gott, der Herr, war helfend nah. Preis ihm, Heil dir, Germania.	1. Germania, Germania, Thou stand'st amidst brightness now. Mist surrounded thy head, The old sun seemed to have been stolen, But God, the Lord, aided thee. He shall be praised, and Hail to thee, Germania.
2. Germania, Germania, Wie stehst du jetzt in Jugend da. Zum zweiten Leben, frisch und schön, Ließ Alexander dich ersteh’n, Als ihn die Neva scheiden sah. Preis ihm, Heil dir, Germania.	2. Germania, Germania, Thou stand'st before us in full youth. It was Alexander who gave thee This second life, fresh and beautiful, When the Neva saw him depart. He shall be praised, and Hail to thee, Germania.
3. Germania, Germania, Wie stehst du jetzt gewaltig da. Nennt deutscher Mut sich deutsch und frei, Klingt Friedrich Wilhelm Dank dabei. Ein Wall von Eisen stand er da. Preis ihm, Heil dir, Germania.	3. Germania, Germania, Thou stand'st before us formidably. Whenever German courage is called German and free, Gratitude shall be expressed for Frederick William. He was firm like a wall of iron. He shall be praised, Hail to thee, Germania.
4. Germania, Germania, Wie steh’n der Fürsten Scharen da. Von alter Zwietracht keine Spur, Getreu den Banden der Natur, So kommen sie von fern und nah. Preis ihm, Heil dir, Germania.	4. Germania, Germania, How do the princes stand together. No trace of former discord, Faithful to the bonds of nature, This is how they come, from far and near. He shall be praised, and Hail to thee, Germania.
5. Germania, Germania, Wie stehst du ewig dauernd da. Was Sehnsucht einzeln still gedacht, Wer hat’s zu einem Ziel gebracht? Franz, Kaiser Franz – Viktoria! Preis ihm, Heil dir, Germania!	5. Germania, Germania, How dost thou stand forever and ever. What desire thought in every individual, Who brought it together? Francis, Emperor Francis – Victory! He shall be praised, and Hail to thee, Germania.

== Other patriotic works ==
Besides "Germania", Beethoven also set other patriotic songs to music, for example "Des Kriegers Abschied" and "Abschiedsgesang an Wiens Bürger".

Des Kriegers Abschied		Abschiedsgesang an Wiens Bürger	
1. Ich zieh' ins Feld, von Lieb' entbrannt, Doch scheid' ich ohne Tränen; Mein Arm gehört dem Vaterland, Mein Herz der holden Schönen; Denn zärtlich muss der wahre Held; Stets für ein Liebchen brennen, Und doch fürs Vaterland im Feld; Entschlossen sterben können.	1. I approach the battlefield, inflamed by love, But I depart without a single tear; My arm belongs to the fatherland, My heart to the comely beloved; Because a true hero must tenderly Be in love with a sweetheart, But simultaneously be prepared To die for the fatherland on the battlefield.	1. Keine Klage soll erschallen, Wenn vom hier die Fahne zieht, Tränen keinem Aug' entfallen, Das im Scheiden nach ihr sieht. Es ist Stolz auf diese Zierde; Und Gefühl der Bürgerwürde, Was auf aller Wangen glüht.	1. No complaint shall resound When the banner leaves.; No eye that looks, parting, at the city Shall drop a tear. It is pride in this exquisite army, And a sense of civic dignity That glows on every man's cheek.
2. Ich kämpfte nie, ein Ordensband; Zum Preise zu erlangen.; O Liebe, nur von deiner Hand; Wünscht' ich ihn zu empfangen; Lass eines deutschen Mädchens Hand; Mein Siegerleben krönen, Mein Arm gehört dem Vaterland, Mein Herz der holden Schönen!	2. I have never fought To receive medals as reward.; O my beloved, only from your hand I desire to get such a reward; May the hand of a German girl Crown my victorious life, My arm belongs to the fatherland, My heart to the comely beloved.	2. Freunde, wünscht in Siegestönen; Uns zur edlen Reise Glück.; Heiter folg' uns nach, ihr Schönen, Euer seelenvoller Blick! Unsers Landes Ruhm zu mehren, Zieh'n wir mutig hin und kehren Würdiger zu euch zurück.	2. Dear friends, wish us, with cries of victory, Luck on our noble journey. May your glance, full of emotions, Gayly be on us departing! In order to increase our country's reputation, We depart courageously and eventually return More glorious than we are now.
3. Denk' ich im Kampfe liebewarm Daheim an meine Holde, Dann möcht ich seh'n, wer diesem Arm; Sich widersetzen wollte; Denn welch ein Lohn wird Liebchens Hand; Mein Siegerleben krönen, Mein Arm gehört dem Vaterland, Mein Herz der holden Schönen!	3. If I, during battle, ardently have My sweetheart in mind, I want to see him who is able To resist my arm. Because, what a reward, my sweetheart's hand Will crown my victorious life. My arm belongs to the fatherland, My heart to the comely beloved.	3. Trotzend steh'n vor Donnerschlünden; Kann wohl auch der Bösewicht.; Milden Sinn und Mut verbinden, Menschheit ehren kann er nicht! Nie das Glück der Tugend trüben, Brüderlich den Landmann lieben: Das ist deutscher Helden Pflicht!	3. Every villain can Cope with the abyss of war.; But he cannot join together gentleness and courage, Or honour mankind! To never becloud virtue, To love the peasant: This is the duty of German heroes!
4. Leb' wohl, mein Liebchen, Ehr und Pflicht; Ruft jetzt die deutschen Krieger, Leb' wohl, leb' wohl und weine nicht, Ich kehre heim als Sieger; Und fall' ich durch des Gegners Hand, Dann soll mein Ruf noch tönen: Mein Arm gehört dem Vaterland, Mein Herz der holden Schönen!	4. Farewell, my sweetheart, honour and duty Call the German warrior now.; Farewell, farewell, and do not cry, I will return victoriously; And if I die by a foe's hand, My cry shall continue to resound: My arm belongs to the fatherland, My heart to the comely beloved.	4. Freut euch, Väter, jubelt, Mütter!; Nirgend, wo das Corps erscheint, Nicht bei Feinden, wird ihm bitter Von der Unschuld nachgeweint. Edel wollen wir uns rächen, Schweigen, bis die Taten sprechen, Sie bewund're selbst der Feind!	4. Rejoice, fathers, and cheer, mothers!; Where'er the corps appears, Even in the country of our enemy, The loss of innocence shall not bemoaned. We want to take revenge in a noble way, Be silent until it is time for action Which even our foe admires.
		5. Bessre Menschen, bessre Bürger, Als wir nun von hinnen geh'n, Keine sittenlosen Würger, Sollt ihr in uns wiederseh'n. Unser Wien empfängt uns wieder, Ruhmbekränzet, stark und bieder; Auf! Lasst hoch die Fahne weh'n!	5. Better humans, better citizens As we are now, departing, No immoral murderers Will we be when you see us again. Our Vienna will welcome us Strong, honest and adorned with a wreath of glory; Let's depart! Let the banner flutter!
		6. Lasst uns folgen dieser Fahne, Durch Theresens Kunstwerk reich, Deren Goldband uns ermahne: Tugend macht uns Fürsten gleich. Ha! Wenn wir zurück sie bringen, Wollen wir im Jubel singen: Dieses Band hielt Österreich!	6. Let us follow this banner Which is enriched Theresia's wise government, And whose golden band shall warn us: Virtue makes us the equal of princes. Lo! When we will bring it back We want to sing, inflamed by elation: This band secured Austria
