= Germania Bietigheim =

Germania Bietigheim can refer to the following German association football clubs:

- SV Germania Bietigheim 1909, a football club in Württemberg.
- SV Germania Bietigheim Baden, a football club in Baden.
