= Germanic religion =

Germanic religion may refer to:

- Germanic paganism
- Christianisation of the Germanic peoples
- Modern paganism in German-speaking Europe
  - Heathenry (new religious movement) a.k.a. Germanic neopaganism
