= German trawler V 410 Germania =

German fishing trawler and patrol boat

History
- Name: Germania
- Owner: N. Ebeling Hochseefischerei (1934–39); Kriegsmarine (1939–44)
- Port of registry: (Nazi Germany) Bremerhaven, Germany (1934–39); Kriegsmarine (1939–44)
- Builder: Howaldtswerke AG
- Yard number: 753
- Launched: 11 July 1934
- Completed: 4 August 1934
- Commissioned: 17 September 1939
- Out of service: 12 August 1944
- Identification: Code Letters DOPX; Fishing boat registration BX 248 (1934–39); Pennant Number V 403 (1939); Pennant Number V 410 (1939–44)
- Fate: Struck a mine and sank

General characteristics
- Tonnage: 427 GRT, 168 NRT
- Length: 50.50 m (165 ft 8 in)
- Beam: 8.34 m (27 ft 4 in)
- Draught: 3.97 m (13 ft 0 in)
- Depth: 4.65 m (15 ft 3 in)
- Installed power: Triple expansion steam engine, 79nhp
- Propulsion: Single screw propeller
- Speed: 13 1/2 knots (25.0 km/h)

Germania was a German fishing trawler that was requisitioned by the Kriegsmarine in the Second World War for use as a Vorpostenboot, serving as V 403 Germania and V 410 Germania. She sank in the Gironde Estuary in August 1944.

== Description ==
Germania was 50.50 metres (165 ft 8 in) long, with a beam of 8.34 metres (27 ft 4 in). She had a depth of 4.65 metres (15 ft 3 in) and a draught of 3.97 metres (13 ft 0 in). She was assessed at 427 GRT, 168 NRT. The ship was powered by a triple expansion steam engine, which had cylinders of 37 centimetres (14 3/4 in), 61 centimetres (24 in) and 100 centimetres (39 3/8 in) diameter by 65 centimetres (25 9/16 in) stroke. The engine was built by Howaldtswerke AG, Kiel, Germany and was rated at 79nhp. It drove a single screw propeller. It could propel the ship at 13 1/2 knots (25.0 km/h).

== History ==
Germania was built as yard number 753 by Howaldtswerke AG, Kiel, Germany. She was launched on 11 July 1934 and completed on 4 August. She was built for N. Ebling Hochseefischerei, Bremerhaven, Germany. The Code Letters DOPX were allocated, as was the fishing boat registration BX 248.

On 17 September 1939, she was requisitioned by the Kriegsmarine and commissioned with 4 Vorpostenflotille as the Vorpostenboot V 403 Germania. On 16 October 1939, she was redesignated V 410 Germania. On 12 August 1942, she was attacked by Bristol Beaufighter aircraft of 235 and 248 Squadrons, Royal Air Force and set afire. Germania sank in the Gironde Estuary with the loss of three of her crew.

== Sources ==
- Gröner, Erich (1993). Die deutschen Kriegsschiffe 1815-1945 (in German). Vol. 8/I: Flußfahrzeuge, Ujäger, Vorpostenboote, Hilfsminensucher, Küstenschutzverbände (Teil 1). Koblenz: Bernard & Graefe. ISBN 3-7637-4807-5.
