= Timpson Creek =

Stream in Georgia, USA

Coordinates: 34°51′27.34″N 83°30′51.59″W

Timpson Creek is a stream in the U.S. state of Georgia. It flows into Lake Burton.

A variant name is "Timson Creek". The creek is named after John Timson, a Cherokee Indian who settled near its banks.
