= SS Germania =

A number of steamships have been named Germania, including:-

- SS Germania (1847), in service with Austrian-Lloyd 1847-73
- SS Germania (1856), in service with Hamburg-Amerikanische Packetfahrt Aktien-Gesellschaft 1856-78
- SS Germania (1864), in service with Sveabolaget 1908-11
- SS Germania (1870), in service with Hamburg-Amerikanische Packetfahrt Aktien-Gesellschaft 1870-76 and Hamburg-Sudamerikanische Dampfschifffahrts-Gesellschaft in 1876
- SS Germania (1903), in service with the Compagnie Francaise de Navigation a Vapeur Cyprien Fabre & Compagnie 1903-14
- SS Germania (1908), in service with Svenska Lloyd 1908-17
- SS Germania (1944), a Hansa A type cargo ship in service with Hellenic Lines 1954-55
