= Germanicopolis =

Germanicopolis (Greek: Γερμανικόπολις) may refer to several cities named after Germanicus:

- Germanicopolis in Bithynia, a former name of Tahtalı, Turkey
- Germanicopolis in Isauria, a former name of Ermenek, Turkey
- Germanicopolis in Paphlagonia, a former name of Çankırı, Turkey
