= National Hotel, Toronto =

Hotel in Toronto, Ontario

Coordinates: 43.6512°N 79.3680°W

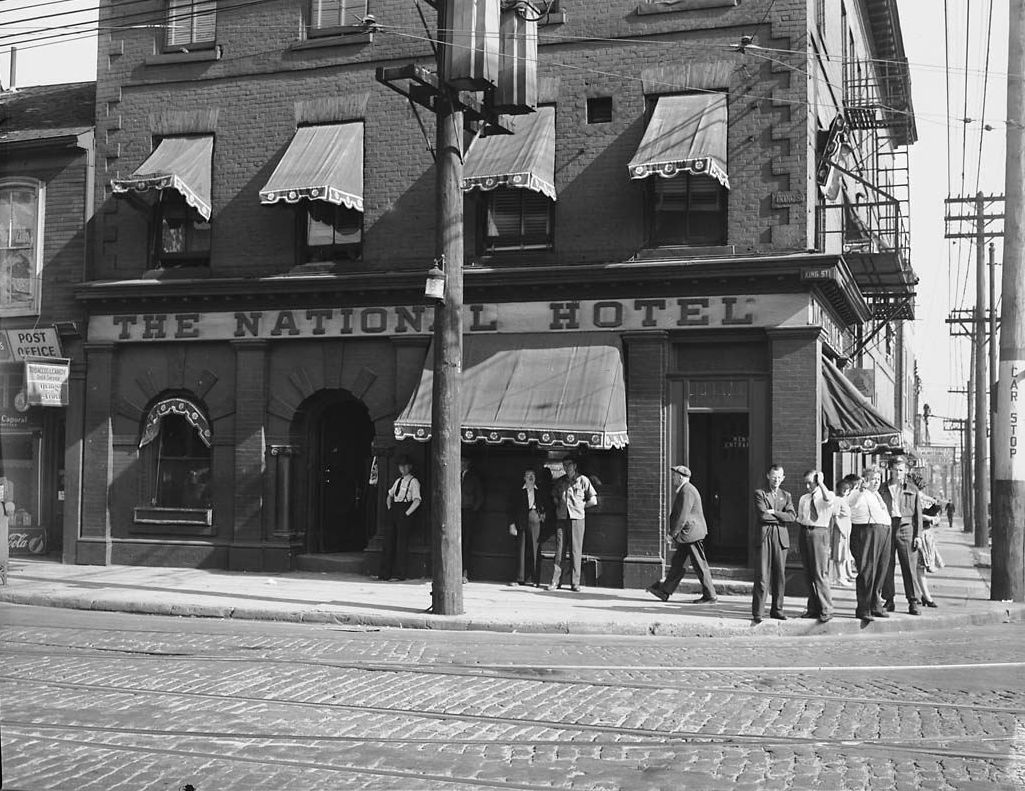
The National Hotel in 1945.

The National Hotel was a hotel built on the southeast corner of King and Sherbourne streets, in Toronto, Ontario, Canada. Under pressure for condominium apartment redevelopment, the City of Toronto attempted to preserve the building, designating it a heritage site in 2009, but the building was eventually torn down in 2013. The hotel's north and west facades were preserved as part of the new condominium development, examples of "facadism" in Toronto.

The hotel was originally called the "British Exchange Inn" when it was run by its first proprietor George Ross. The hotel was listed in the 1856 Boulton Atlas. In 1861, tax records show it was a three-story brick building.

In 1868, the hotel was rebuilt and renamed the Grand Central Hotel and was managed by a William Burke, who expanded the building east – "likely in response to legislation enacted under pressure from the temperance movement". Hotels needed to offer a certain number of rooms to rent before they were entitled to a liquor license. Charles Brewer, the owner in 1905, further expanded the structure to the south. The architect responsible for the 1905 expansion was Henry Simpson, a protege of E.J. Lennox, whose design was in the Richardsonian Romanesque style. The "Terry Museum", one of Toronto's first museums, was housed in the hotel from 1874 to 1878.

The property was listed on the City of Toronto Inventory of Heritage Properties in 1973. Despite this, in 2009 Ram's Head Development, the building's owners, announced plans to replace the building with an 18-storey high-rise. The plan stirred controversy and the City of Toronto applied to have the property designated under the Ontario Heritage Act. The building was protected under the heritage act on October 27, 2009. This was appealed to the Ontario Municipal Board (OMB). The OMB ordered the City of Toronto to approve the development with the retention of the north and west facades. Demolition proceeded in 2013. The "King+" condominium development opened in 2015.

== See also ==
- List of lost buildings and structures in Toronto
