= Betygala Eldership =

Eldership of Lithuania

The Betygala Eldership (Lithuanian: Betygalos seniūnija) is an eldership of Lithuania, located in the Raseiniai District Municipality. In 2021 its population was 1652.
