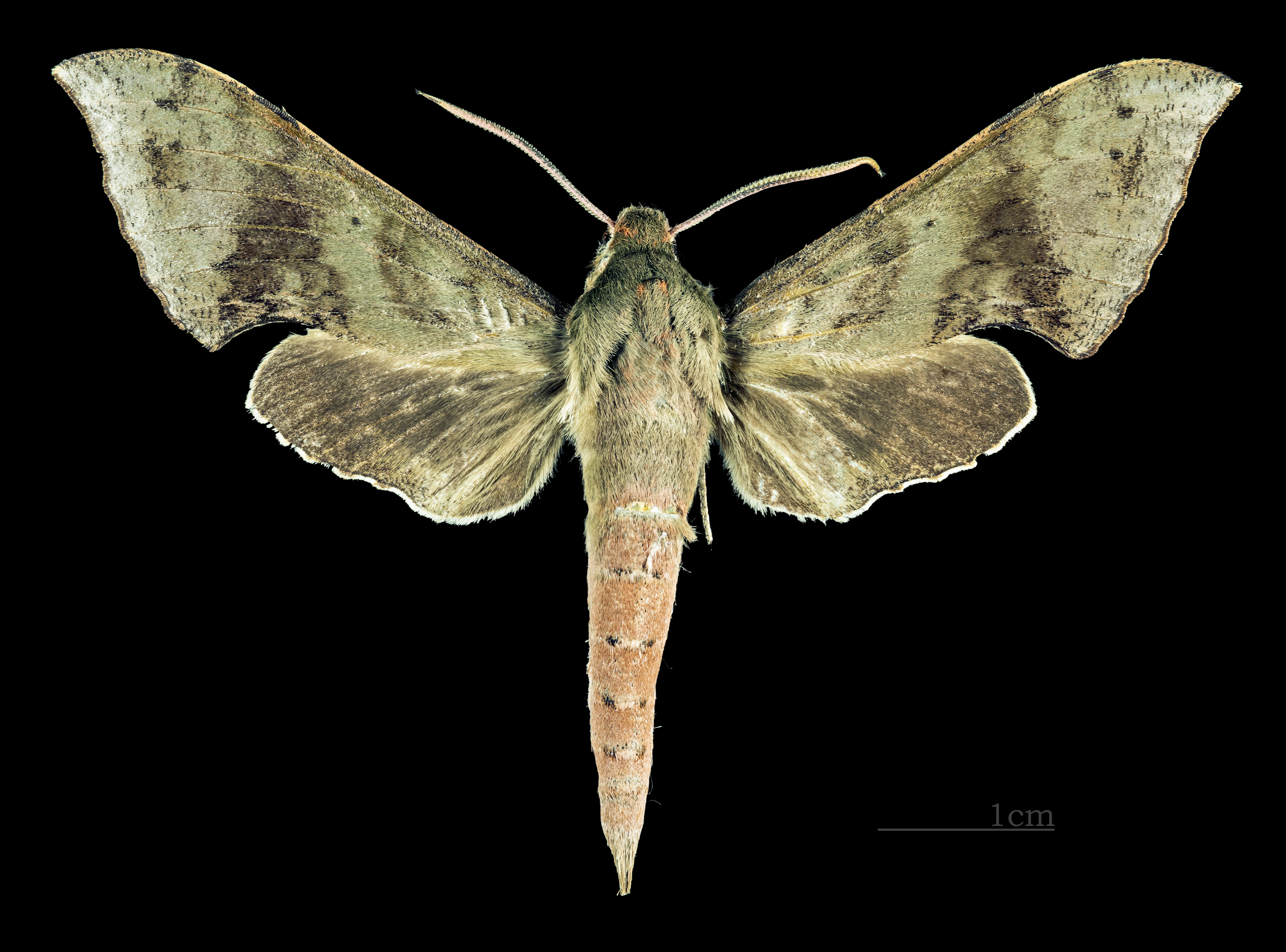
- Dorsal MHNT
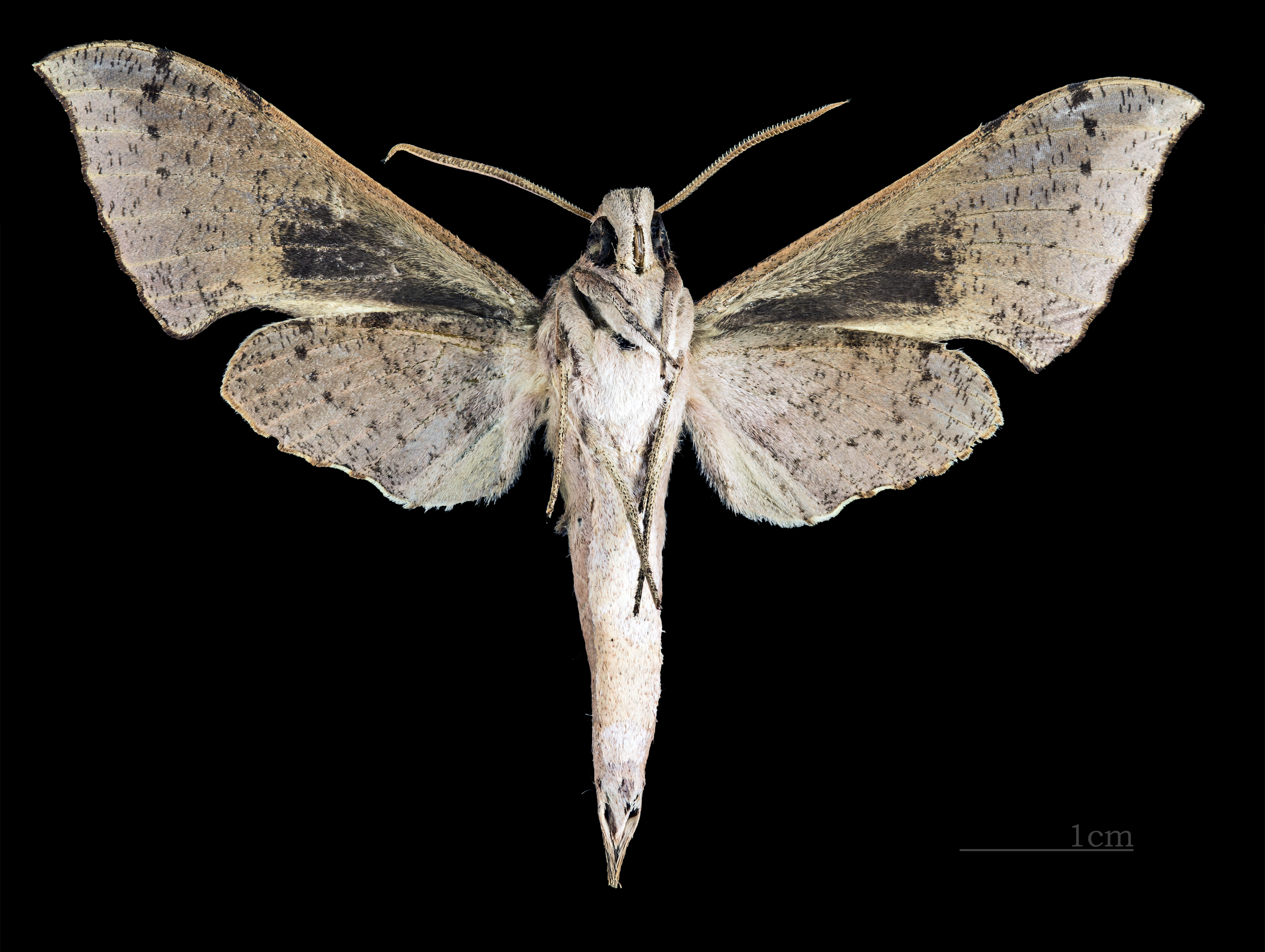
- Ventral MHNT

Scientific classification
- Domain: Eukaryota
- Kingdom: Animalia
- Phylum: Arthropoda
- Class: Insecta
- Order: Lepidoptera
- Family: Sphingidae
- Genus: Xylophanes
- Species: X. germen

Binomial name
- Xylophanes germen (Schaus, 1890)

Synonyms
- Calliomma germen Schaus, 1890; Xylophanes germen brevis Clark, 1922

= Xylophanes germen =

Species of moth

Xylophanes germen is a moth of the family Sphingidae. It is known from Mexico, Costa Rica, Guatemala and is found from Venezuela to Bolivia.

The wingspan is 72–85 mm. The forewing has a crenulated outer margin. The forewing upperside ground colour is olive green-grey. The transverse lines are indistinct, the basal and two antemedian lines are curved outward from the inner margin and then back towards the costa. The three postmedian bands are running transversely across the wing, distal to which may be a variably developed paler patch and an orange-brown patch.

Adults are probably on wing year-round.

The larvae feed on Psychotria correae, Psychotria elata, Psychotria eurycarpa and Exostema mexicanum and possibly other Rubiaceae species.

== Subspecies ==
- Xylophanes germen germen (Mexico, Costa Rica, Guatemala)
- Xylophanes germen yurakano Lichy, 1945 (Venezuela to Bolivia)
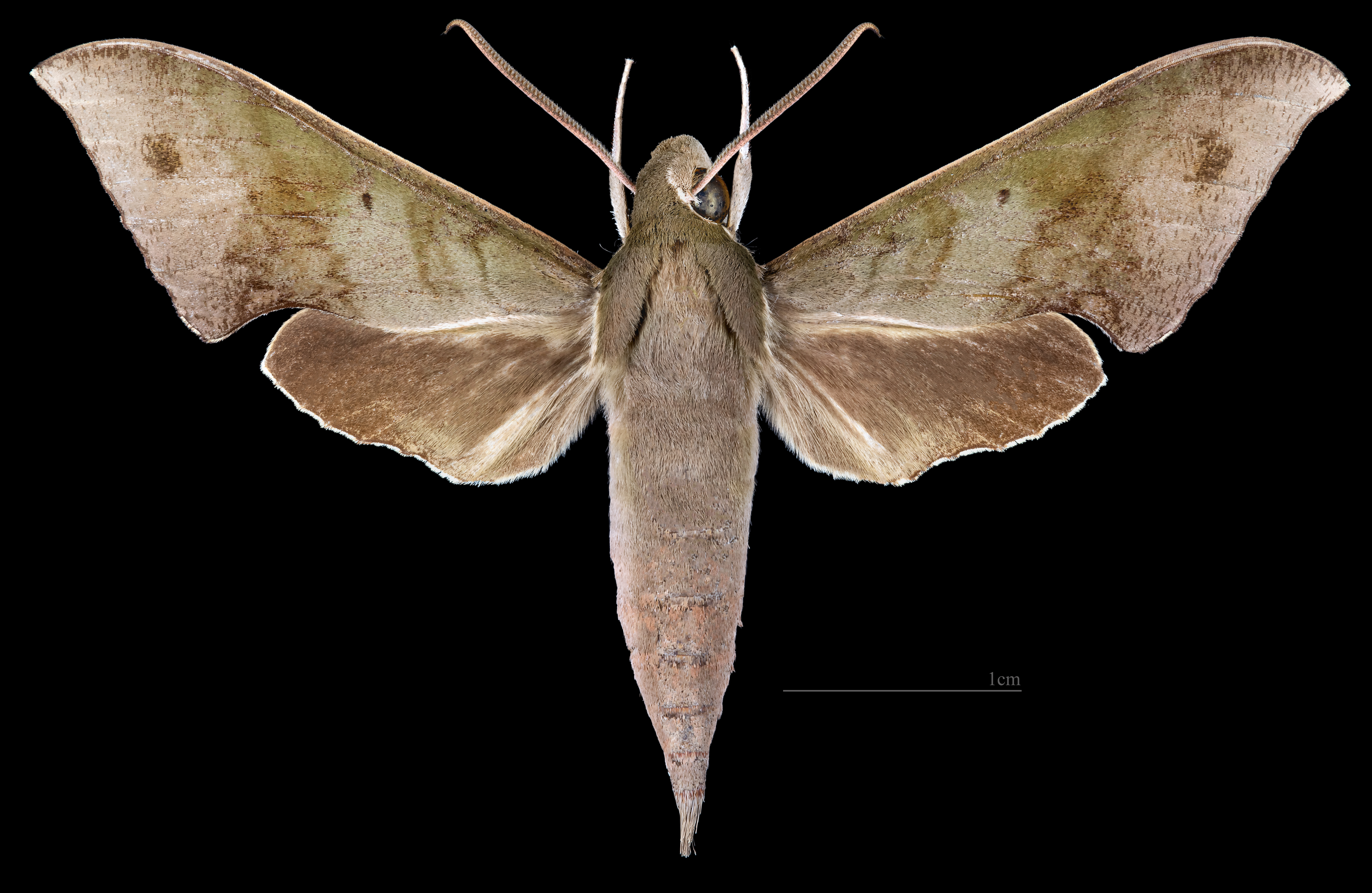
Xylophanes germen yurakano male dorsal

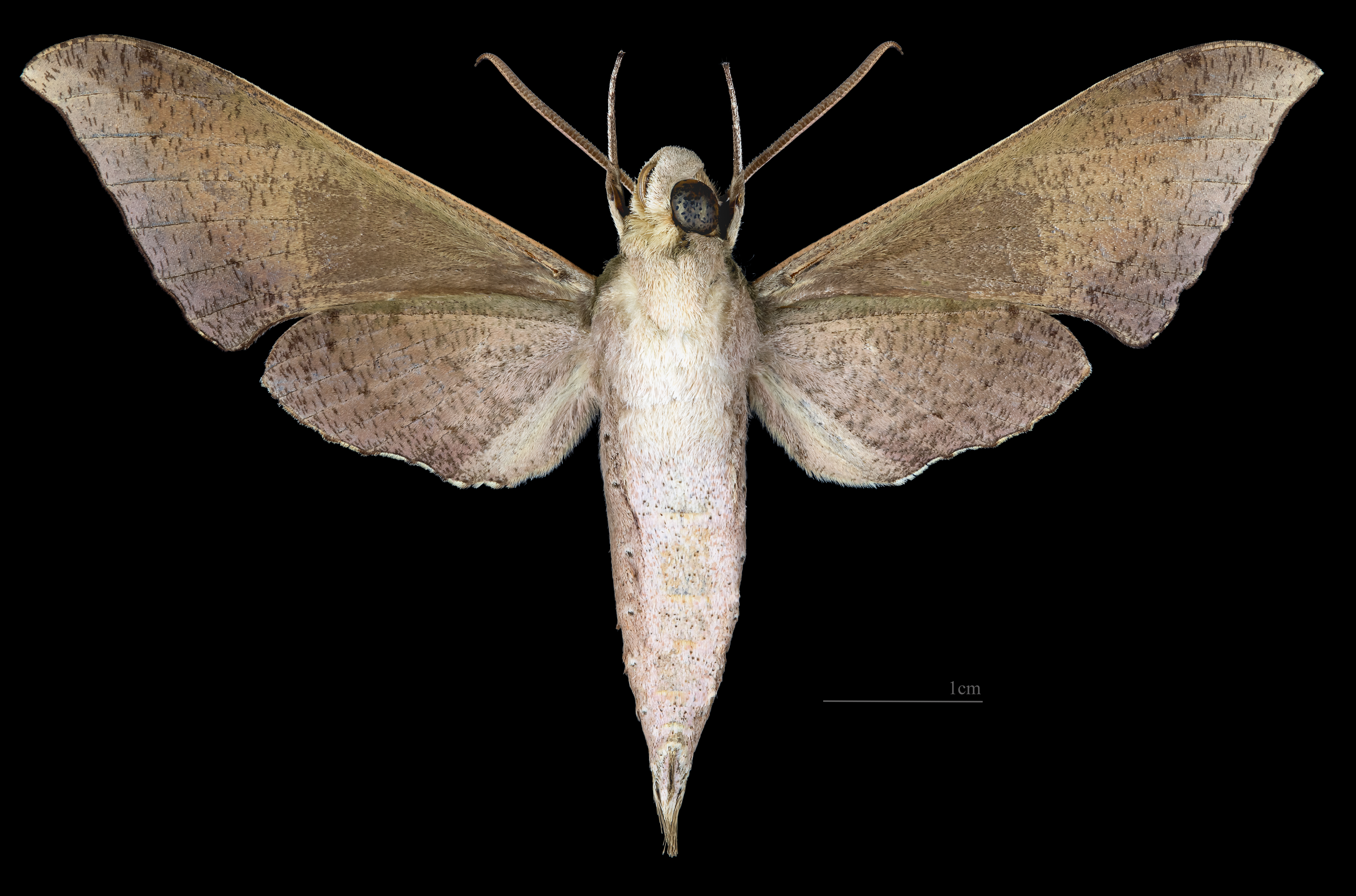
Xylophanes germen yurakano male ventral
