= Oya Germen =

Turkish journalist

- Born: 11 September 1953 (age 71)
- Occupation(s): Image maker, television presenter, columnist

Oya Germen (born 11 September 1953) is a Turkish image maker, television presenter and journalist.

== Personal life ==
Germen was born on 11 September 1953. On 20 January 1975, she married the singer Tahir Nejat Özyılmazel, also known as Neco. She gave birth to two daughters Zeynep on 15 August 1978, and Ayşe on 24 October 1979, who later both became music performers. The couple divorced on 12 October 2007.

== Professional life ==
In 1978, Germen played in the film Gülünüz Güldürünüz ("Laugh and Amuse"). She wrote a book titled Ben Güzelim ya Sen ("I am Beautiful, How About You ?"). In television, she presented a serial show named Oya ile Hayata Güzel Bak ("Look Cheerful to Life with Oya"). She is also a columnist, writing for Posta newspaper under the title Kırık Kalplarin Oya Ablası ("Sister Oya of the Broken Hearts").
