= German =

German(s) may refer to:

- Germany, a country in Europe
  - Germania (Roman era geographical term)
- Germans, citizens of Germany
  - For citizenship in Germany, see also German nationality law
  - Kingdom of Germany (Middle Ages)
  - Germanic peoples (Roman era)
  - Ethnic Germans, groups outside Germany but seen as German
  - German diaspora, Germans or Ethnic Germans outside Germany
- German language
- German cuisine, traditional foods of Germany

== People ==
- German (given name)
- German (surname)
- Germán, a Spanish name

== Places ==
- German (parish), Isle of Man
- German, Albania, or Gërmej
- German, Bulgaria
- German, Iran
- German, North Macedonia
- German, New York, U.S.
- Agios Germanos, Greece

== Other uses ==
- German (mythology), a South Slavic mythological being
- Germans (band), a Canadian rock band
- "German" (song), a 2019 song by No Money Enterprise
- The German, a 2008 short film
- "The Germans", an episode of Fawlty Towers
- The German, a nickname for Congolese rebel André Kisase Ngandu

== See also ==
- Germanic (disambiguation)
- Germany (disambiguation)
- Germanus (disambiguation)
- Germen (disambiguation)
- Germain (disambiguation)
- Germaine (disambiguation)
- Germantown (disambiguation)
- Germen (disambiguation)
- Germane, a simple chemical compound of germanium and hydrogen
