= Jermyn =

Jermyn or Germyn may refer to:

== People ==
- Jermyn (surname)
- Carsen Germyn (born 1982), Canadian ice hockey player
- Germyn Lynch (fl.1441-1483), merchant and entrepreneur from Galway, Ireland
- German Gardiner, sometimes spelt Jermyn Gardiner, executed 1544 for alleged involvement in a plot against Thomas Cranmer; beatified
- Jermyn Creppy (born 1996), Danish rapper and songwriter
- Arthur Jermyn, title character of H.P. Lovecraft's short story "Facts Concerning the Late Arthur Jermyn and His Family"

== Places ==
- Jermyn Street, London
- Jermyn, Pennsylvania, a borough
- Jermyn, Texas, an unincorporated community
