= Germania (Philipp Veit) =

Painting by Philipp Veit (1834–1836)

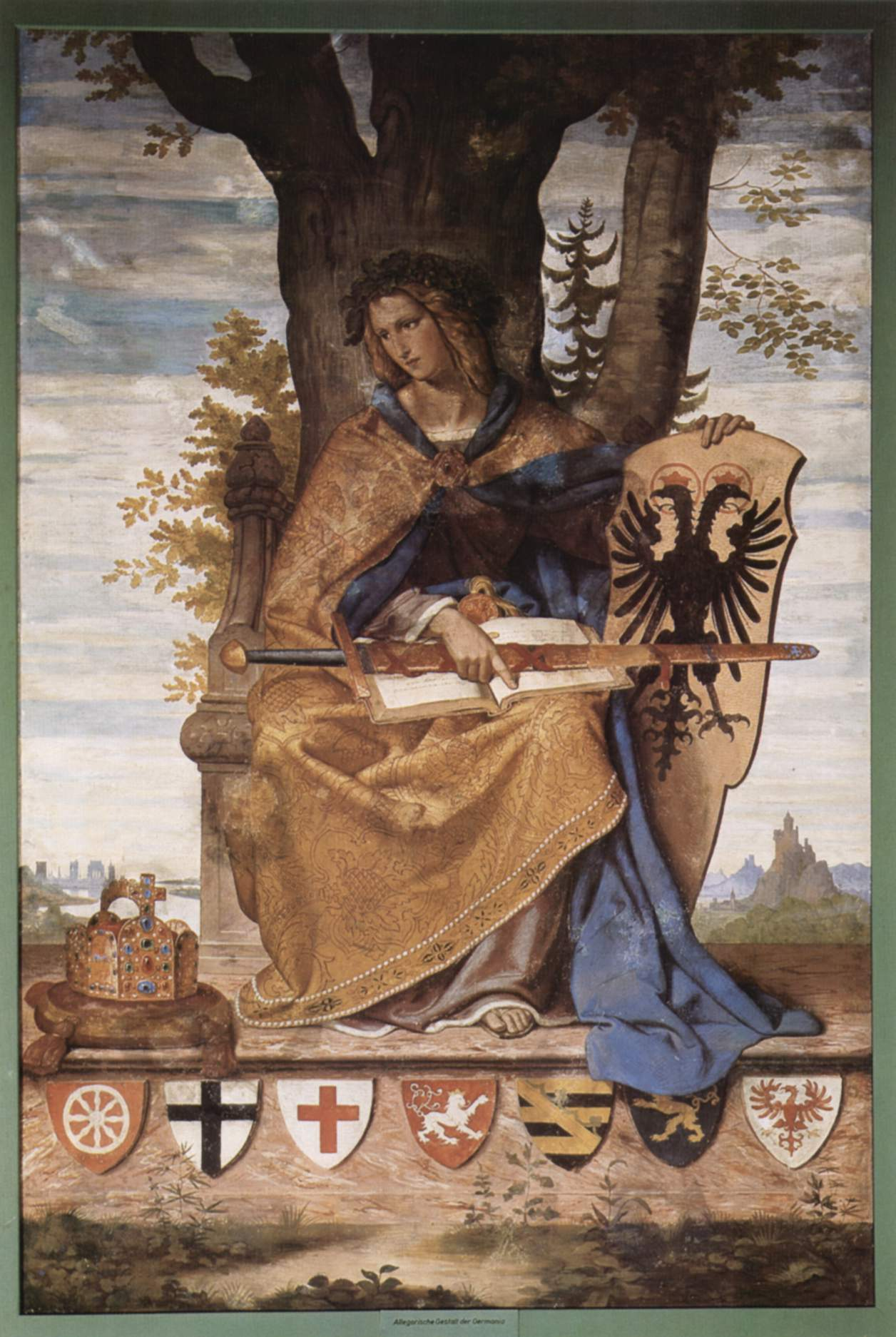
Germania (1834-1836) by Philipp Veit in the Städelsches Kunstinstitut, Frankfurt

Germania is a painting created by Philipp Veit in 1834-1836. Germania in general is a female personification of Germany. This painting is one of two side pictures of the big mural painting Introduction of the Arts to Germany by Christianity. The other side picture presents Italia. The fresco transferred to canvas measures 285 by 192 cm and is exhibited in the Städelsches Kunstinstitut in Frankfurt am Main.

Veit belonged to the artistic circle of the Catholic and conservative Nazarener. They were impressed by the German Middle Ages. The Germania of this painting is not necessarily to understand as a national allegory of the contemporary debates of a united Germany. Much more it represents medieval imperial (secular) power that protects the arts. Italia symbolizes the Papal power.

Often another Germania painting is attributed to Veit, too: that painting hung in the St. Paul's Church in the years 1848 and 1849 when the German National Assembly gathered in Frankfurt. The Germania of the St. Paul's Church, now in Nuremberg, might have been created by different artists but was apparently influenced by Veit's earlier Germania.
