= Germania Turnverein Building =

- U.S. National Register of Historic Places
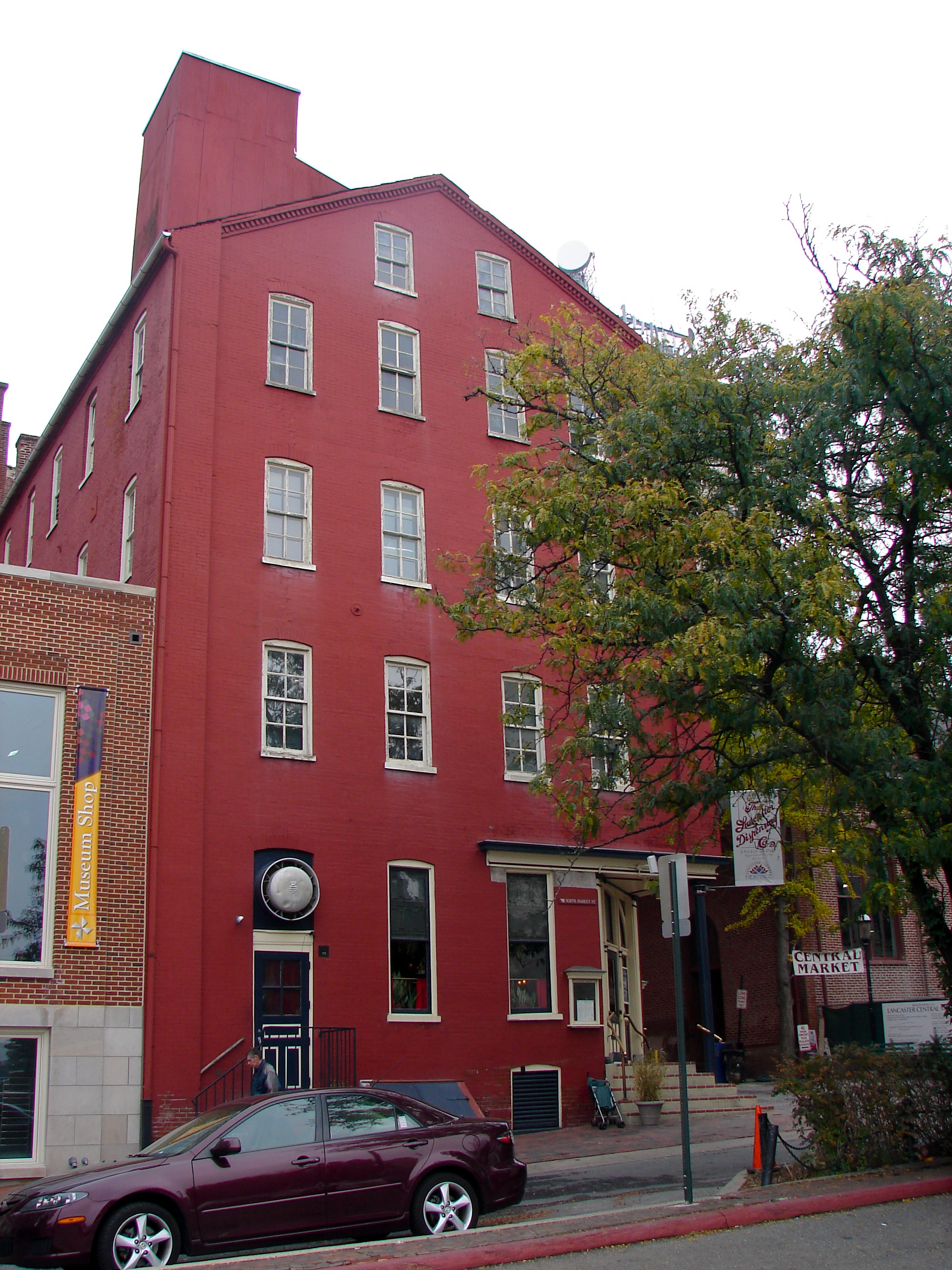
- Germania Turnverein, October 2010

- Location within Pennsylvania Location within the United States
- Location: 33--35 N. Market St., Lancaster, Pennsylvania
- Coordinates: 40°2′20″N 76°18′23″W
- Area: 0.1 acres (0.040 ha)
- Built: 1897-1898
- Built by: Lebzelter, Philip
- Architectural style: Late Victorian
- NRHP reference No.: 80003524
- Added to NRHP: April 10, 1980

The Germania Turnverein Building, also known as the Commercial Printing Company, is an historic commercial building which is located in Lancaster, Lancaster County, Pennsylvania.

It was added to the National Register of Historic Places in 1980.

== History and architectural features ==
Built between 1897 and 1898, the Germania Turnverein Building is a four-story, four-bay-by-five-bay brick building that was designed in a Late Victorian style. It was built as a speculative commercial building by Philip Lebzelter (1829-1906); among its tenants were the Germania Turnverein.
