= National Hotel (St. Louis, Missouri) =

Former hotel in St. Louis, Missouri, United States

Coordinates: 38.624797°N 90.187755°W

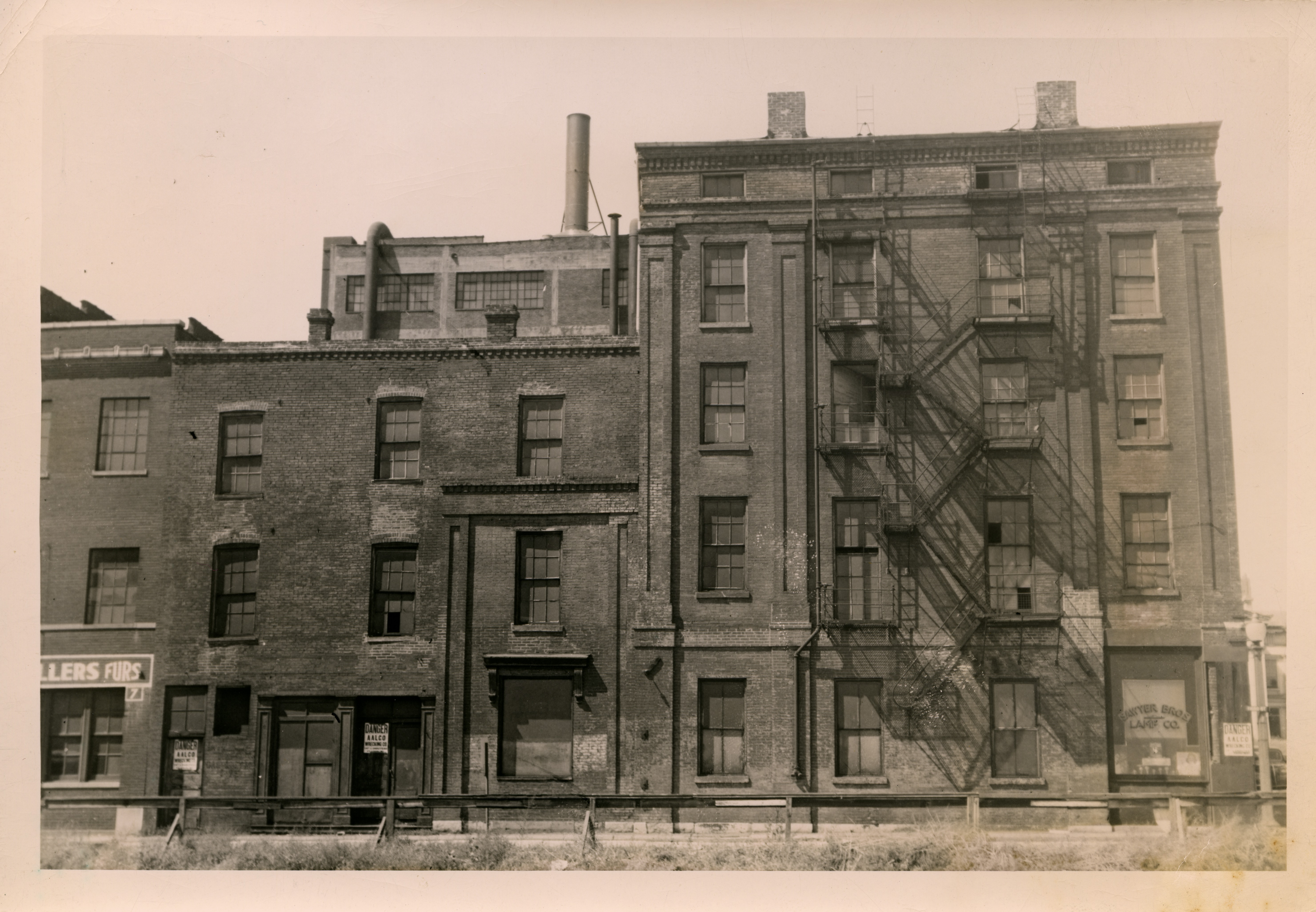
Exterior view of National Hotel (photo taken c. 1940–1959)

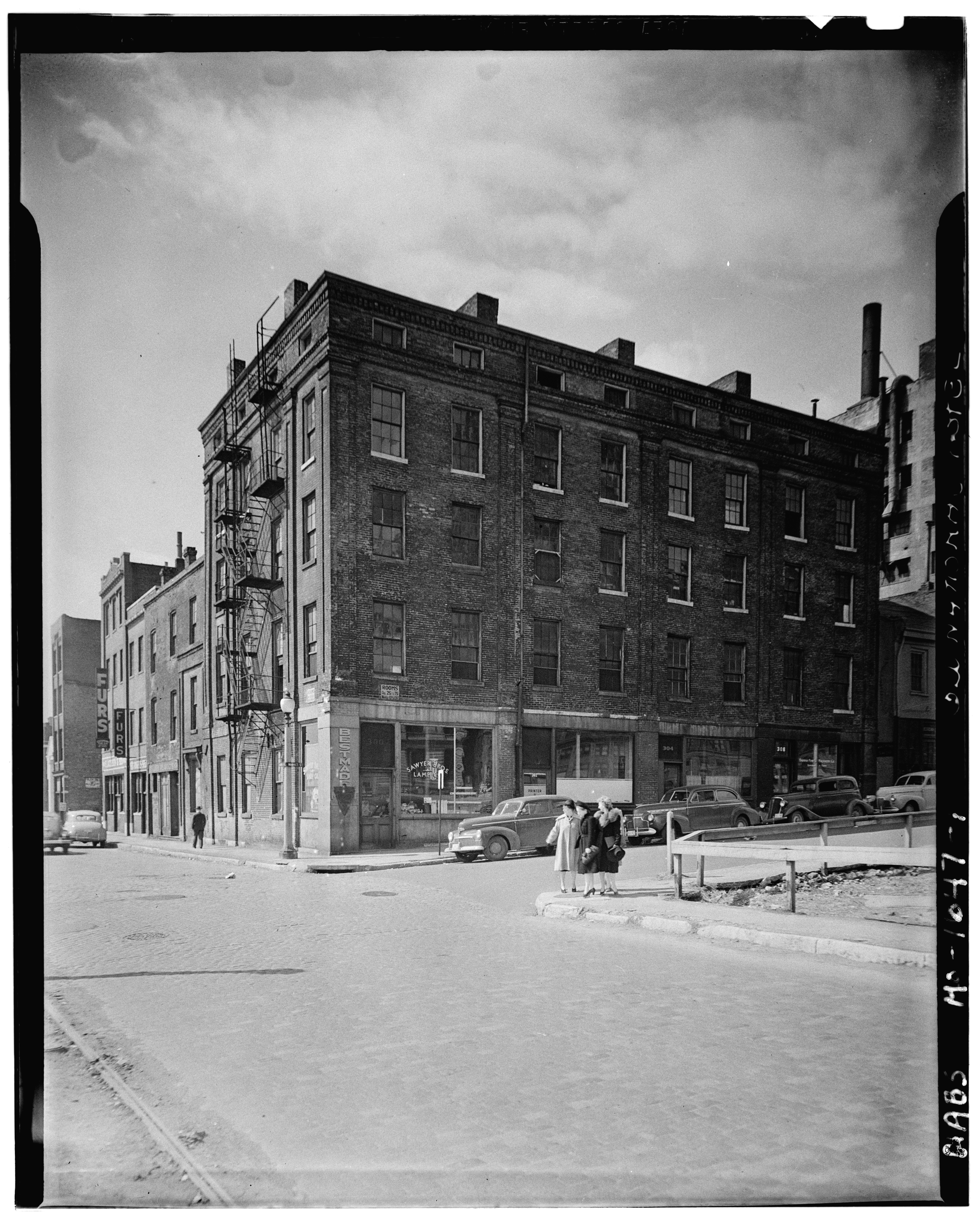
Exterior view of National Hotel

The National Hotel was a historic hotel located at the southwest corner of 3rd and Market Streets in St. Louis, Missouri. The hotel originally opened in 1832 as Scott's Hotel, but this building was destroyed and replaced with a new hotel building built in 1847. Other names for this hotel included the New Scott's Hotel, United States Hotel, Germania House, Atlantic Hotel, St. Clair Hotel, and Rice Hotel. The hotel was five stories high and was known as the St. Louis's most luxurious hotel at the time. The hotel was included in the federal Historic American Buildings Survey, but this did not prevent it from being demolished in 1948. Notable guests at this hotel included Abraham Lincoln, Daniel Webster, and Jefferson Davis.

The first public transit omnibus line for St. Louis was established in 1843. It ran from the old National Hotel to the North St. Louis ferry landing at Madison Street.
