= Tourism in Brittany =

Tourism in Brittany attracts around 13 million visitors a year. An important sector of the region's economy, it accounts for just under 10% of the region's GDP, and directly employs just under 70,000 people. Seasonal activity extends from May to September, and is mainly concentrated on the coast, particularly in the departments of Finistère and Morbihan.

The first tourists visited the region in the early 19th century, attracted by the quality of its mineral waters and the opportunity to enjoy sea bathing. The first seaside resorts appeared on the coast in the 1830s, as in Saint-Malo, gradually replacing therapeutic motivation with more hedonistic dynamics. The social base gradually broadened until the inter-war years, becoming less aristocratic and more bourgeois. Activities diversified to include a form of cultural tourism, focusing on the countryside and certain aspects of Breton culture. The advent of paid vacations in 1936 brought Brittany into the era of mass tourism, and the need to protect the environment from its excesses.

While seaside tourism is concentrated on the coast and represents the largest pole of activity, ecotourism is also notable in central Brittany, complemented by urban tourism in Brittany's biggest cities. The region's culture and heritage are just as much a reason to visit as its natural sites, gastronomy and leisure activities (festivals, sports facilities, etc.).

== History ==
=== Beginnings in the 19th century ===
==== Rise of the first seaside resorts in the first half of the 19th century ====
Historical map of the creation of seaside resorts in Brittany.

At the beginning of the 19th century, Brittany saw the beginnings of tourism near certain water sources, known for their therapeutic values. Under the influence of thermalism, the Clos Poulet near Saint-Malo attracted circles of mineral water drinkers. They developed a certain form of resort worldliness, cut off from the rest of the population. A seawater bathing industry later developed from this initial hub of activity. The same phenomenon can be observed in other towns along the Breton coast, such as Pornic. The popularization of seaside tourism by the British in the first half of the 19th century benefited these early settlements.

From the 1830s onwards, some of these towns began to structure themselves as seaside resorts. This first generation of Breton seaside resorts emerged (Saint-Malo, Pornic) and saw the construction of facilities dedicated to this practice (sea bathing establishments) or the development of existing facilities to adapt them to the clientele (protective dikes and breakwaters converted into promenade areas). To accommodate this wealthy clientele, most often from the aristocracy, gambling establishments opened. The therapeutic dynamic began to give way to a more hedonistic one.

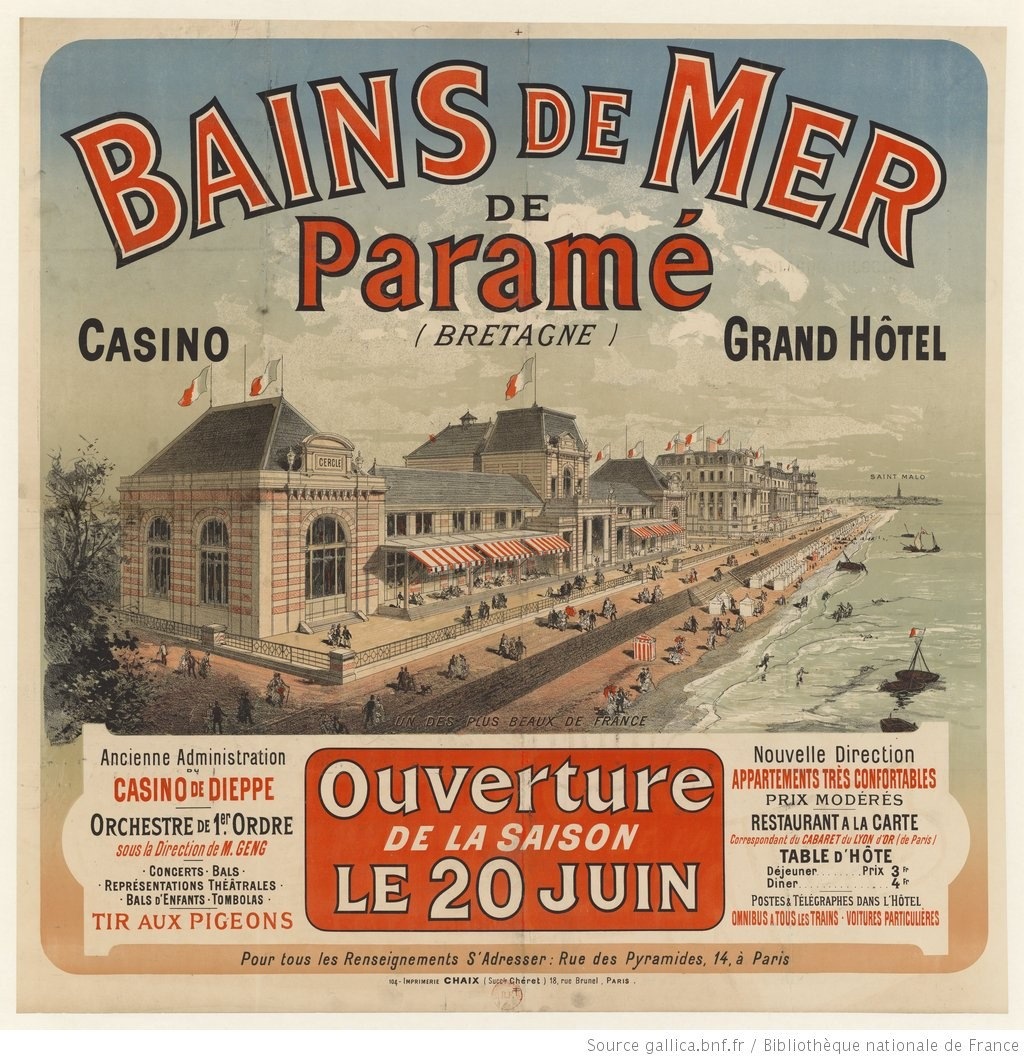
Advertising poster for the Paramé sea baths (1886).

A second generation of seaside resorts developed in Brittany from the 1860s onwards. Driven by a business bourgeoisie seeking to emulate the practices of the aristocracy, they often settled on the outskirts of these first resorts, along the coast (Saint-Lunaire and Saint-Briac from Dinard; Le Pouliguen, La Baule and Pornichet from Le Croisic; Paramé from Saint-Malo). Some of these new resorts grew in importance, even becoming independent communes (Le Pouliguen in 1854 from Batz-sur-Mer, Saint-Pierre-Quiberon in 1856 from Quiberon, La Trinité-sur-Mer in 1864 from Carnac).

==== A business that took off in the mid 19th century ====
The first guide book to the region was published in 1845. Among the sites that attracted visitors at the time were the tomb of Chateaubriand in Saint-Malo (who died in 1848), which became a literary pilgrimage site for his admirers and other artists, and Pont-Aven, where the École de Pont-Aven attracted painters from 1865 onwards. These representations contributed to the folklorization of Breton culture.

From the 1850s onwards, a stereotypical vision of the region, based on the image of peasants in their Sunday best at pardons, or of wild granite coasts, became popular outside Brittany. In 1859, Eugène Boudin presented Le Pardon à Sainte-Anne-la-Palud in Paris and met with a certain success, bringing painters to the region in search of these landscapes and subjects. The publication of Barzaz Breiz in 1838 by Théodore Hersart de La Villemarqué also contributed to this phenomenon. Quimper faience created its first plate with a "Breton" subject in 1878.

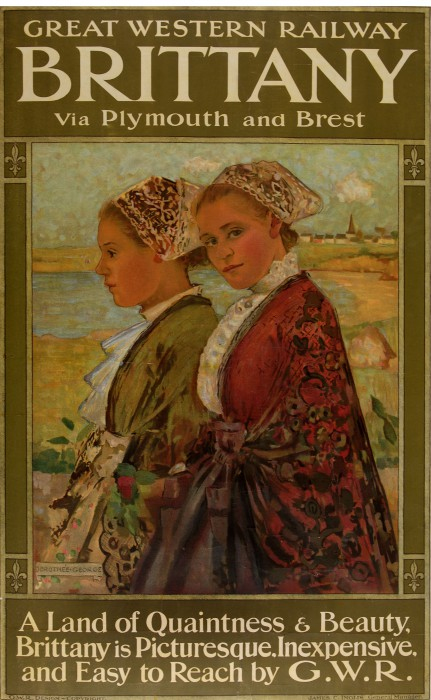
British poster promoting Brittany as a tourist destination.

Between the 1880s and the First World War, major housing development projects were launched in seaside resorts to accompany the arrival of the railroads. A number of projects to build seaside resorts from scratch were launched, often by prominent personalities such as Count Hennecart in La Baule from 1876, or Armand Peugeot in Morgat from 1884. Faced with the importance of this economic activity, town councils took tourists' expectations into account when planning the town's development (maintenance of Pornic's quays to allow strolling, creation of a pier for the same purpose in La Baule in 1892).

This new population also imported its own social practices: the first regattas were held in Le Pouliguen in 1875, and pleasure boating became established there in the 1880s. These tourists, most often from the bourgeoisie, came with their families, which led to the emergence of bathing safety issues. Bathing guides, safety ropes and lifeguard boats were introduced, and advertising brochures, such as those in Quiberon, emphasized this aspect. Finally, the therapeutic dimension of certain activities already present at the beginning of the 19th century continued. Doctor Lhoste invented the marine cure in Saint-Malo in 1850, and in 1899 Louis-Eugène Bagot opened France's first thalassotherapy facility in Roscoff.

Brittany also enjoyed great popularity in Victorian Britain, particularly between 1856 and 1881. Buoyed by the local popularity of Breton authors such as Souvestre, Chateaubriand and de La Villemarqué, British authors travelled there, choosing Brittany as the setting for their literary productions. Robert Browning set several poems there, including Gold Hair: A Story of Pornic and The Two Poets of Croisic, while Ernest Dowson set Yvonne of Brittany and In a Breton Cemetery. Caroline Norton's The Lady of La Garaye, published in 1862, even gave rise to a literary tourism specific to this book, with some visitors specifically seeking out the places presented in the work. This contributed to making Brittany one of the most popular destinations for British tourists at the time.

The question of how to protect tourist sites began to be raised as early as 1900, which led to the island's classification as France's first landscape site: on 13 July 1907, the departmental commission of the Côtes-du-Nord (now Côtes-d'Armor) classified the island of Bréhat as one of the "natural sites and monuments of artistic character" to be preserved.

The arrival of a population from outside the region induced by tourism is also an opportunity for Bretons to interact with the region. Some work as domestic servants for this clientele, and sometimes leave the region to continue working for these new employers. Local mores were also evolving, leading some to fear a certain emparisianism. At the turn of the century, the first folk festivals were held to entertain tourists. Théodore Botrel used his reputation for Breton culture to launch the Pardon des Fleurs d'Ajonc in Pont-Aven in 1905. Traditional costumes and Breton music take center stage. The same year, the Fête des Filets bleus in Concarneau used the same formula to attract tourists, this time with a social aspect, using the proceeds to help local populations.

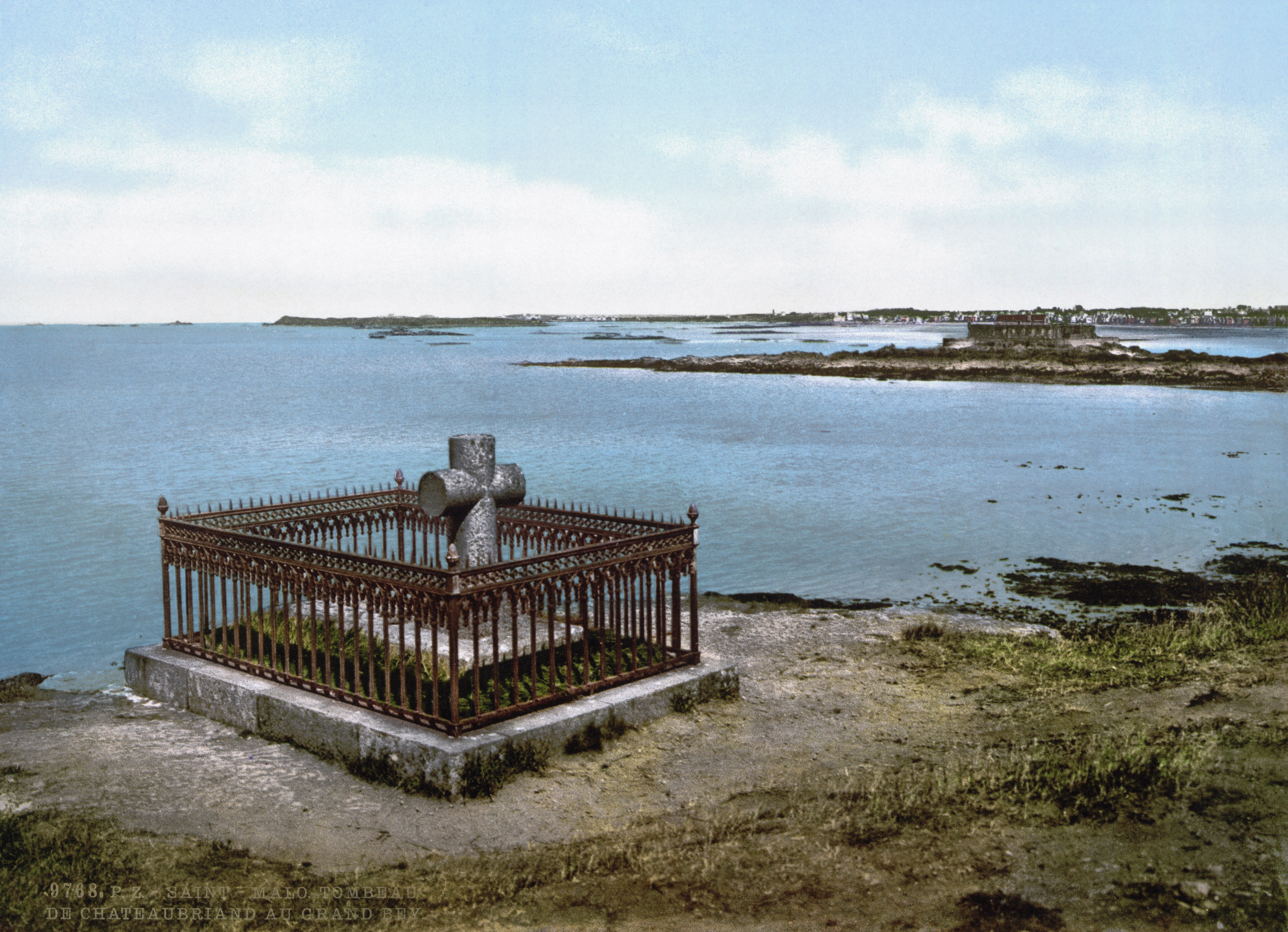
Chateaubriand's tomb in Saint-Malo.

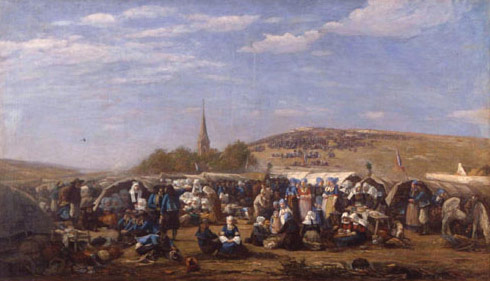
Le Pardon à Sainte-Anne-la-Paludd by Eugène Boudin, 1859.

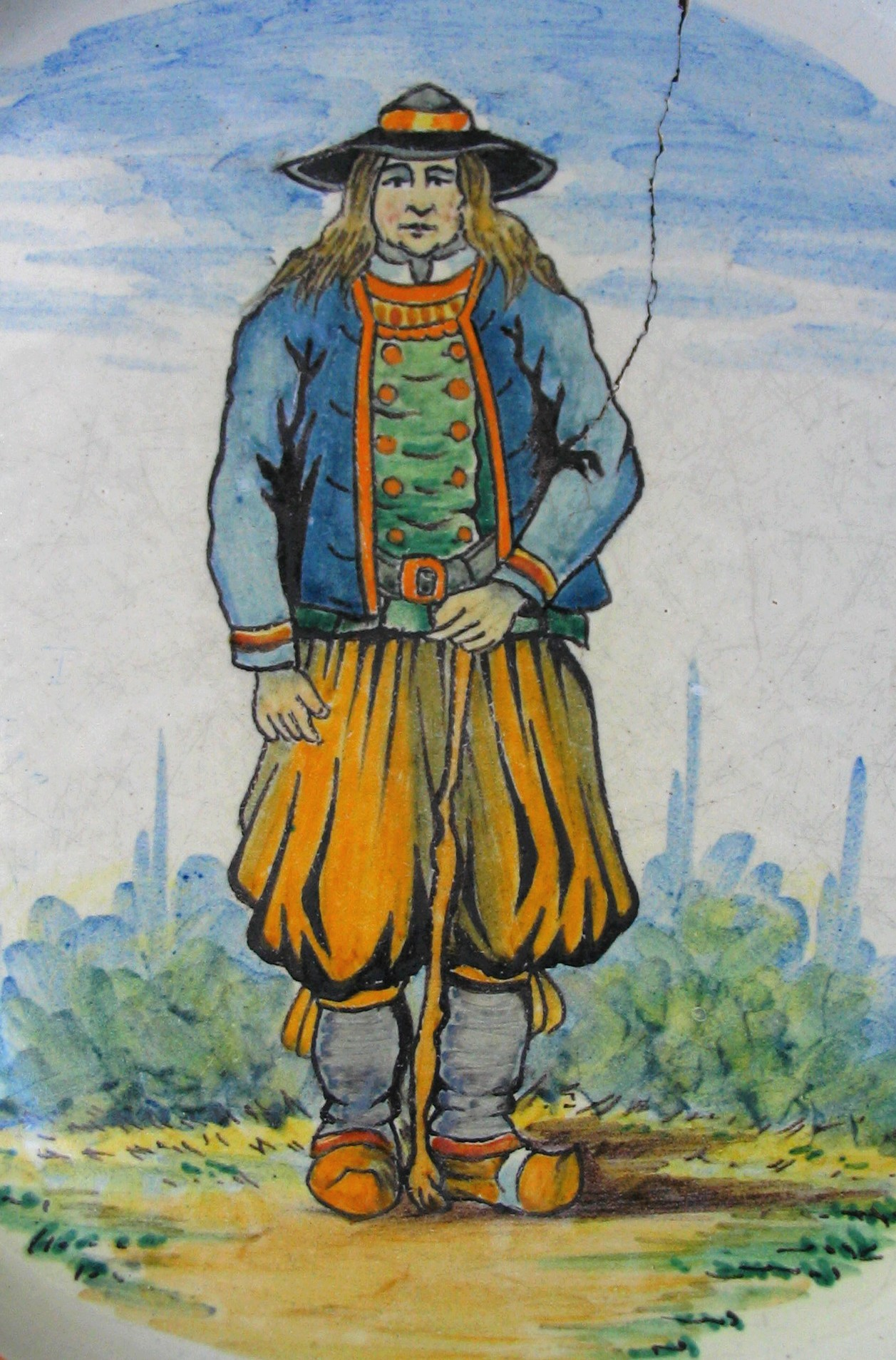
Quimper faience with a "Breton" theme.

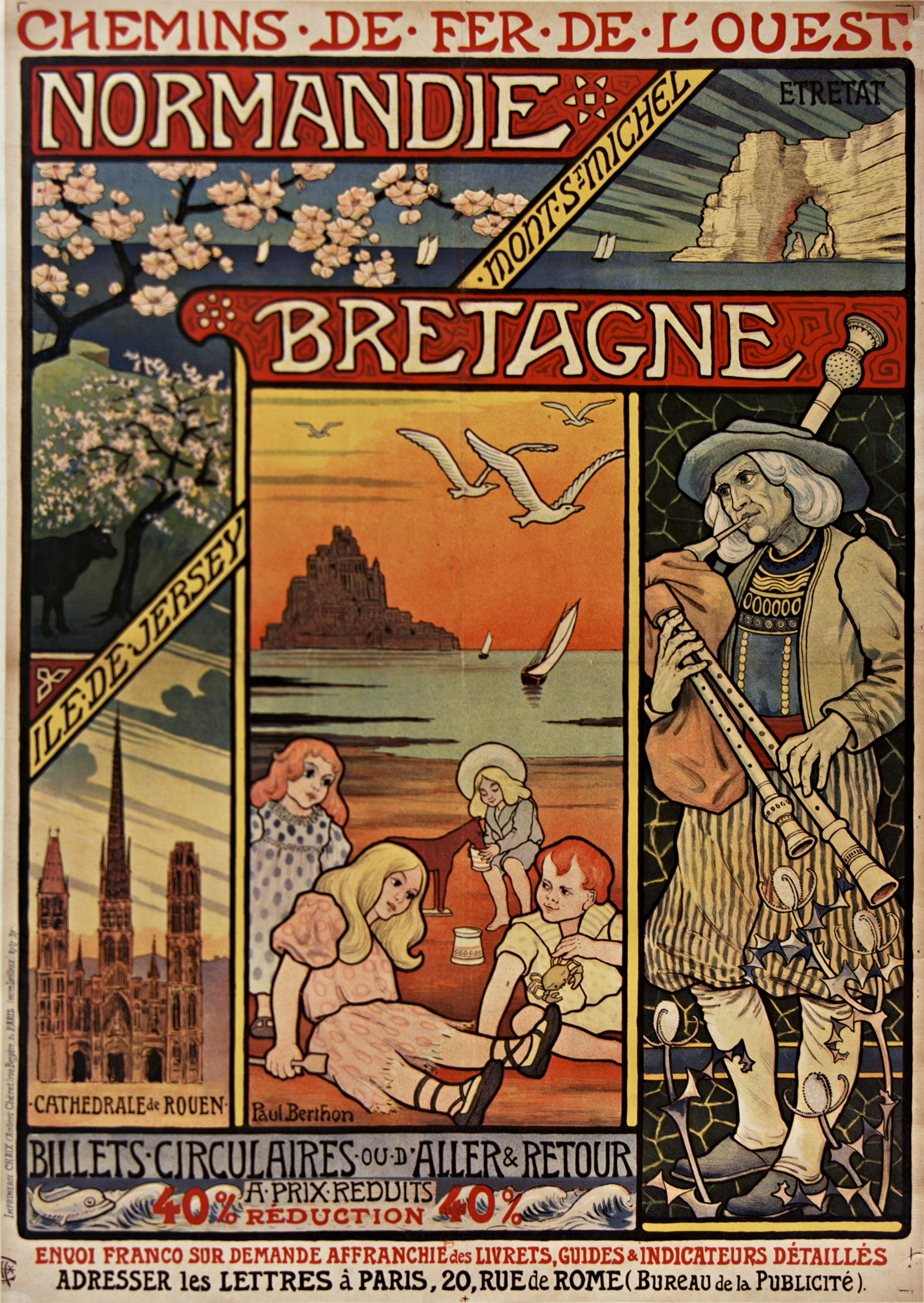
Railways have a certain stereotype.

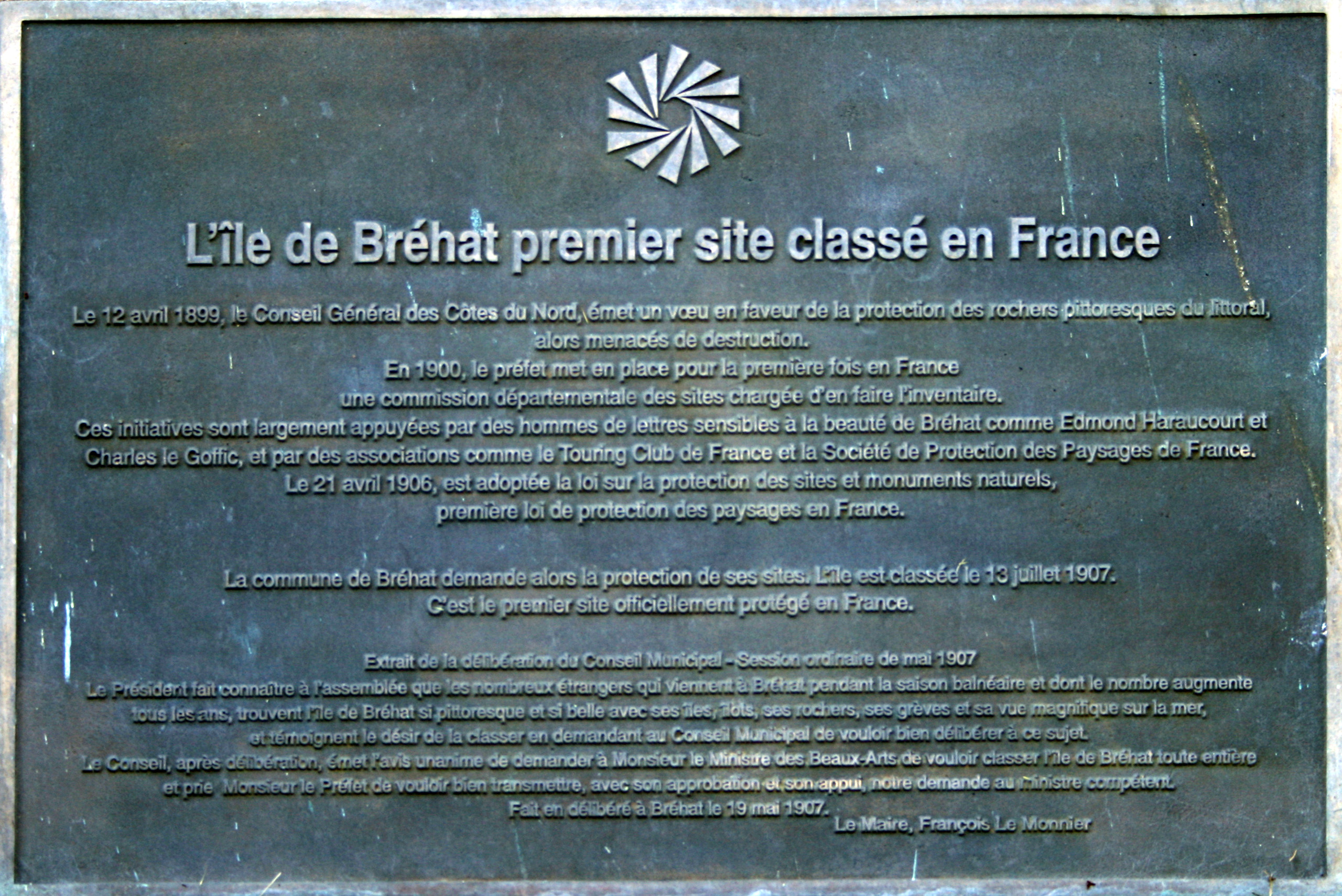
Plaque inaugurating the Bréhat classification.

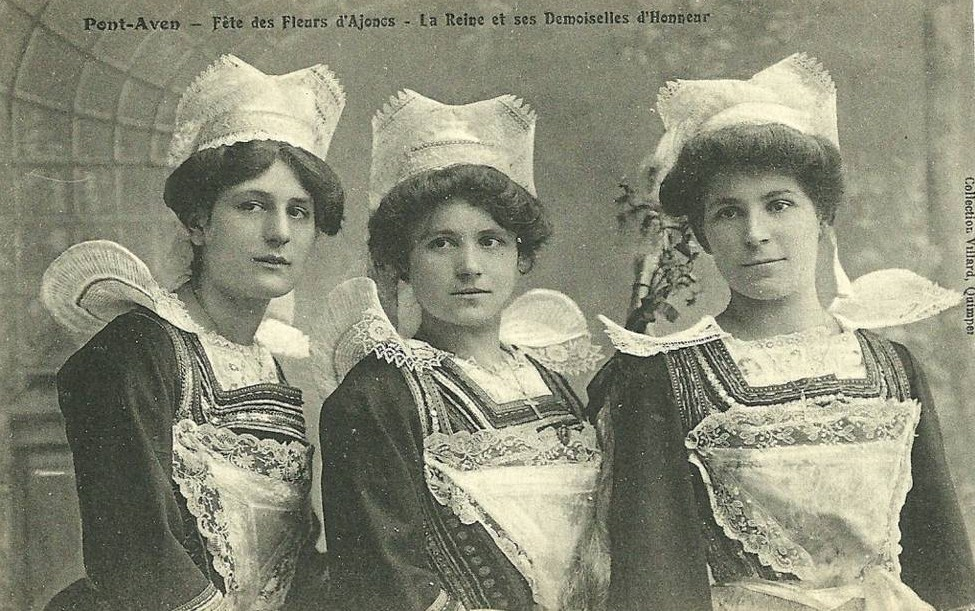
Postcard from the Pardon des Fleurs d'Ajonc in Pont-Aven.

=== The boom between the wars ===
During the inter-war years, tourism continued to grow, mainly on the coast. Several factors contributed to its development. The automobile made travel easier, and some roads were even built for it (route de la corniche in Perros-Guirec in 1925, route de la mer in La Baule in 1928). A network of tourist associations was set up to better inform tourists, and a magazine, La Bretagne touristique, was published for the same purpose in 1922. Finally, new seaside resorts were created ex nihiloc, such as Kerfany-les-pins, or grew in importance, as in Quiberon.

The very wealthy clientele continued to frequent the same resorts as before the war, and facilities such as golf courses, tennis courts and racecourses became widespread. By 1935, there were 12 casinos, 7 golf courses and 17 marinas in the region. In 1926, La Baule-Escoublac and Dinard had 50 and 86 hotels respectively – welcoming a total of 70,000 visitors at the same time. Cohabitation with the local population was not always easy, and tourists regularly complained of being solicited by children alms. The Depression of 1929 curtailed some of this luxury tourism, and several casinos closed after that date. British and American customers in particular deserted the region after this date.

Paid vacations in the summer of 1937 breathed new life into the business, with half a million French holiday makers and 100,000 foreigners arriving in the region, which by then had some 150 seaside resorts. The clientele, however, was of a new type, and included many Bretons who had travelled to Paris for work and then returned home for the summer. Much more popular, this type of tourism saw the development of camping and homestays, as well as vacation camps. In terms of its scale and form, it foreshadowed the mass tourism that would confront the region after the Second World War.

=== The post-war period ===
==== A development that raises questions until the end of the 20th century ====
The leisure society that began to take shape in the early post-war years led to the emergence of new seaside resort development projects in the region. Between 1947 and 1952, the first wave of construction projects was planned for the towns of Sarzeau and Arzon. Although these were initially postponed, other similar projects saw the light of day in Guidel in 1963 (VVF) and in Carnac 1966 (Port an Dro). These projects took on a new dimension when Raymond Marcellin, President of the Morbihan General Council, planned the creation of a 15,000-bed complex on the Rhuys Peninsula. The model then in vogue was inspired by the Spanish example and the tourist development of the Languedoc-Roussillon coastline. At Port-la-Forêt in the south of Finistère, a resort for 20,000 inhabitants was planned, along with a marina. Although the ports were built, the related real estate projects were eventually abandoned, as environmentalist ideas gained in popularity among the population at the time.

Oil spills following the sinking of the Torrey Canyon (1967) and the Amoco Cadiz (1978), as well as the Plogoff nuclear power plant project, provoked strong public reaction, and any plans to develop the coastline for tourism were met with considerable opposition. The 1986 Coastal Act put a definitive end to land pressure on the Breton coast. More generally, the issue of tourism development became central to local politics; while in the 1950s CELIB saw it as an asset to enable Bretons to "live and work in the country", in the 1970s the question of the cost and reality of the economic spin-offs for the local population became a major issue.

The 1950s and 1960s saw the emergence of a movement to safeguard and promote small-scale local heritage, at a time when certain activities were in decline (de-Christianization of the countryside, modernization of the fishing industry, etc.). The period saw campaigns to restore chapels and maritime and rural heritage, often on the initiative of local associations, and the creation of museums on this theme, such as the Musée de la pêche in Concarneau, which opened in 1961, or the village of Poul-Fetan in 1985. At the same time, Breton culture was also being preserved and promoted. The dynamism of fest-noz and bagadoù, while contributing to the region's tourist appeal, also raised the question of the "consumption" and alteration of Breton culture to meet tourist expectations. The preservation of certain sites, such as the Carnac stones or the historic town center of Tréguier, in the face of overtourism was not without its share of local opposition in the 1970s, when already-established economic activities were threatened.

The region is also gaining in visibility and accessibility, with a knock-on effect on its tourist appeal. As the French became increasingly equipped with television sets, and mass media such as cinemas developed, Brittany hosted film shoots such as Pêcheur d'Islande (in Concarneau in 1959) or Les Vikings (at Fort la Latte the same year), showcasing the Breton landscape. The Breton road plan decided in 1968 made the western tip more easily accessible to tourist vehicles. The region's image was also worked on by institutions, and two départements saw their names changed to become more sales-friendly: Loire-Inférieure became Loire-Atlantique in 1958, and Côtes-du-Nord became Côtes-d'Armor in 1990.

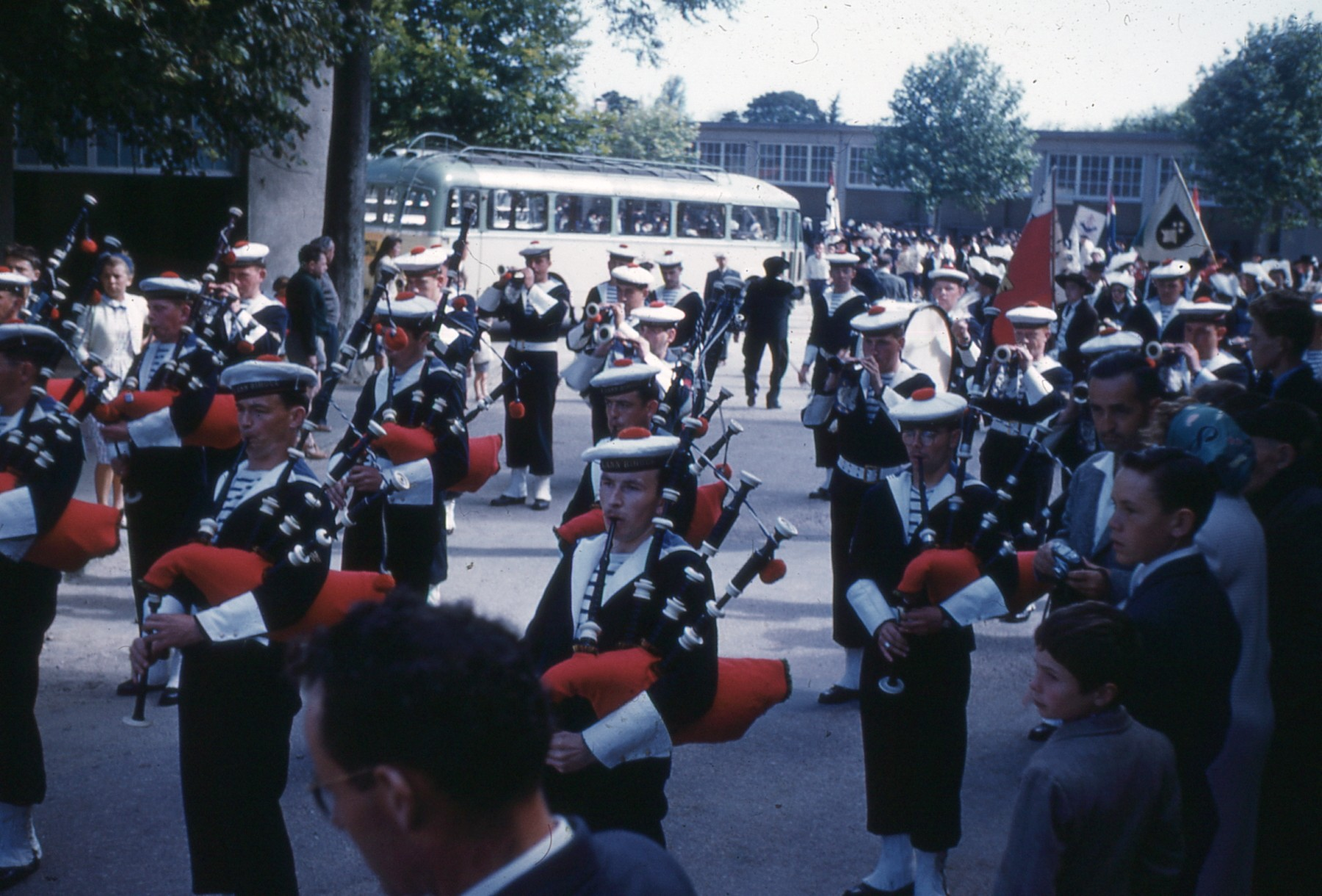
The bagadoù, expression of Breton culture from 1947.

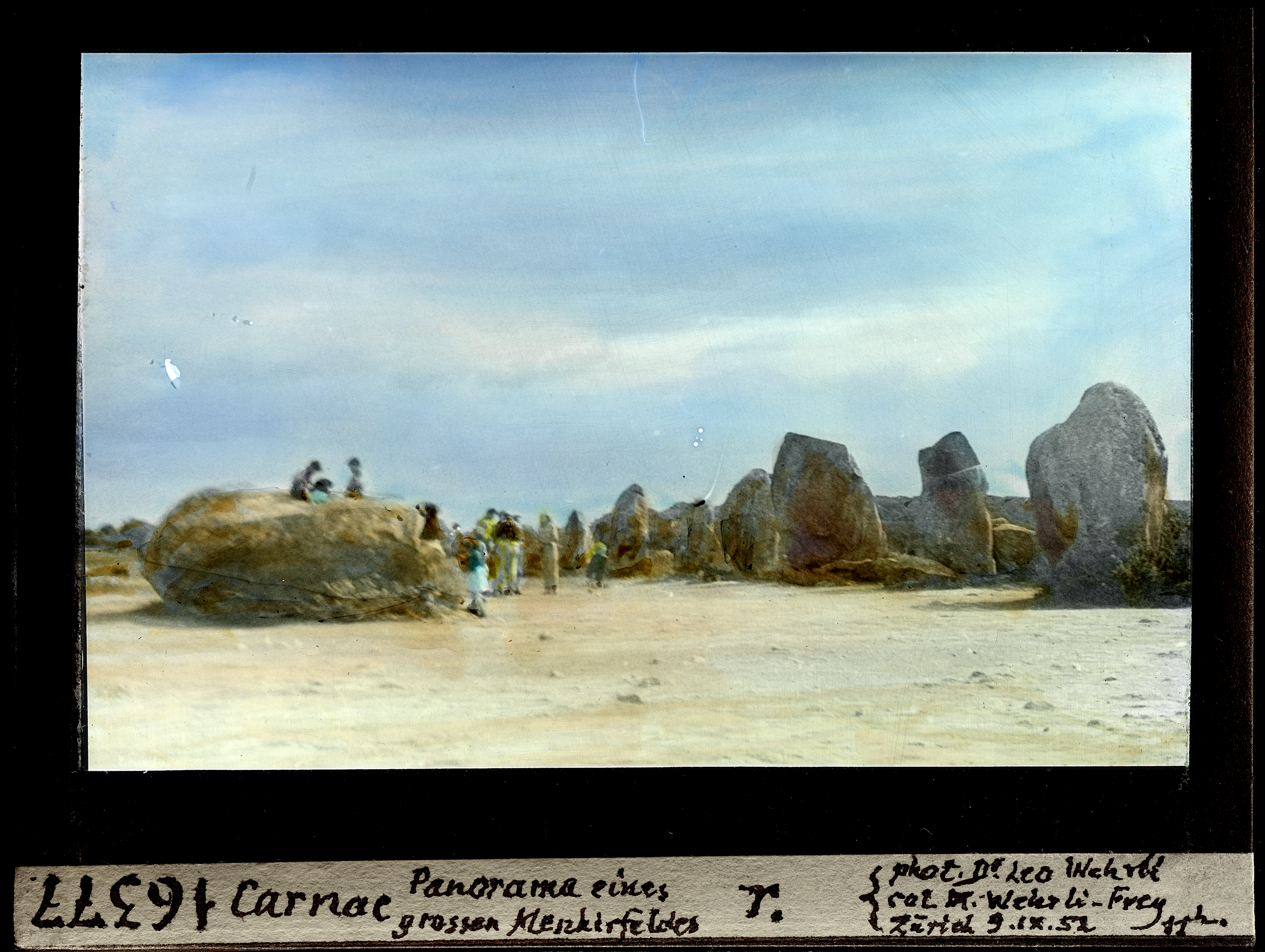
Tourists on the menhirs of Carnac before the site was protected.

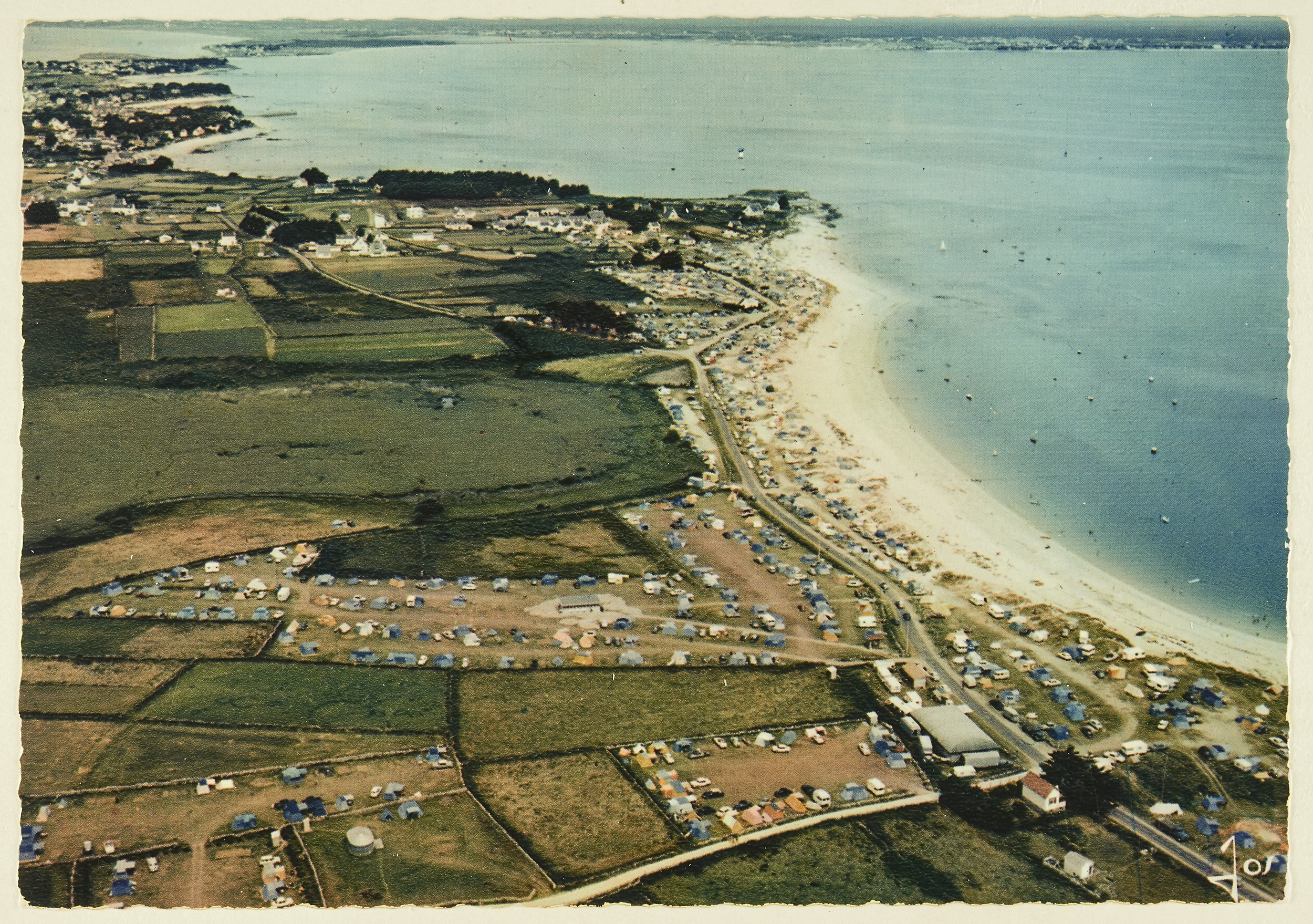
Wild camping in the natural site of Gâvres-Quiberon.

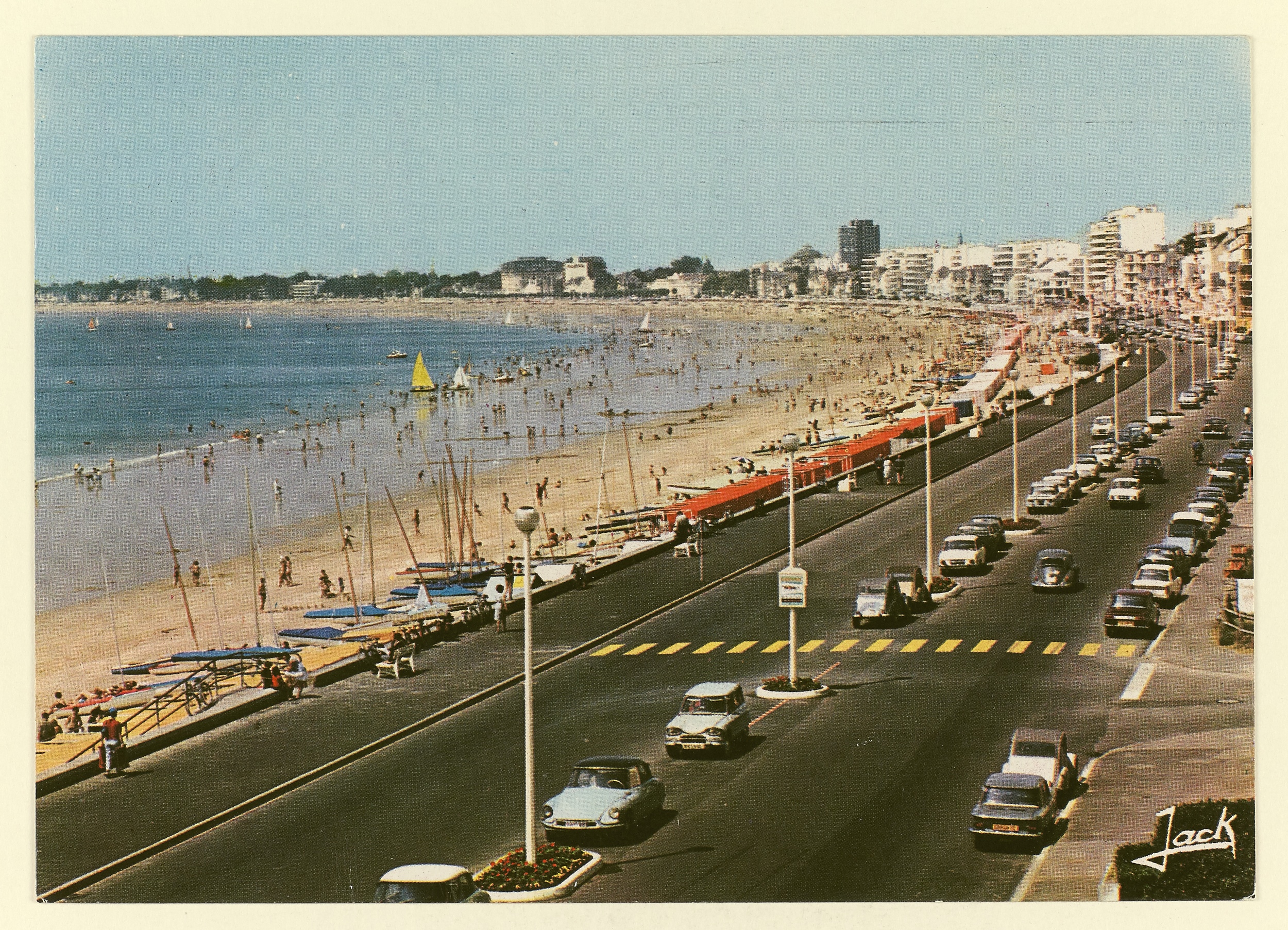
Cars are becoming increasingly important here in La Baule.

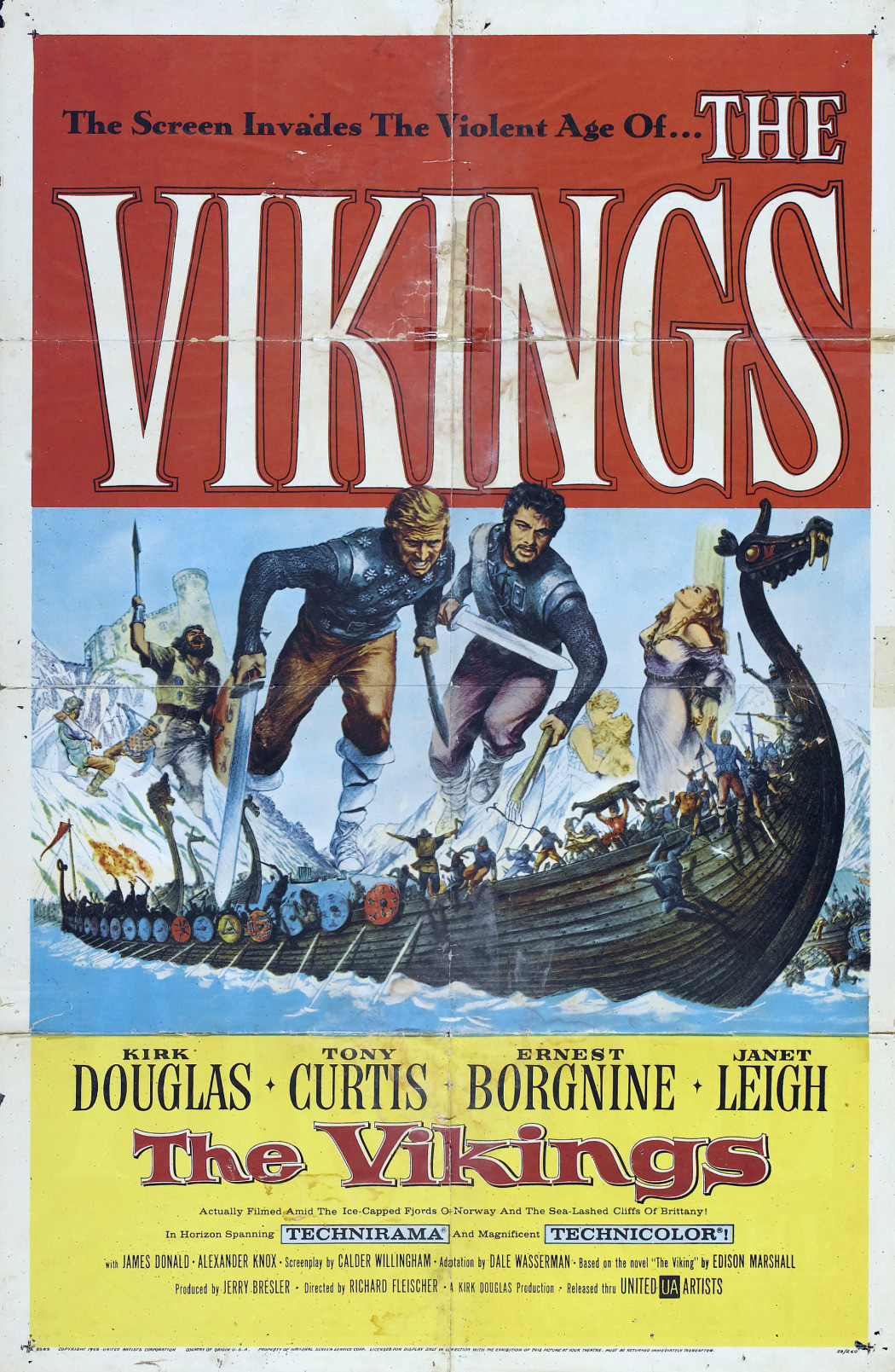
Films shot in the region such as Les Vikings popularize Brittany.

==== Current challenges ====
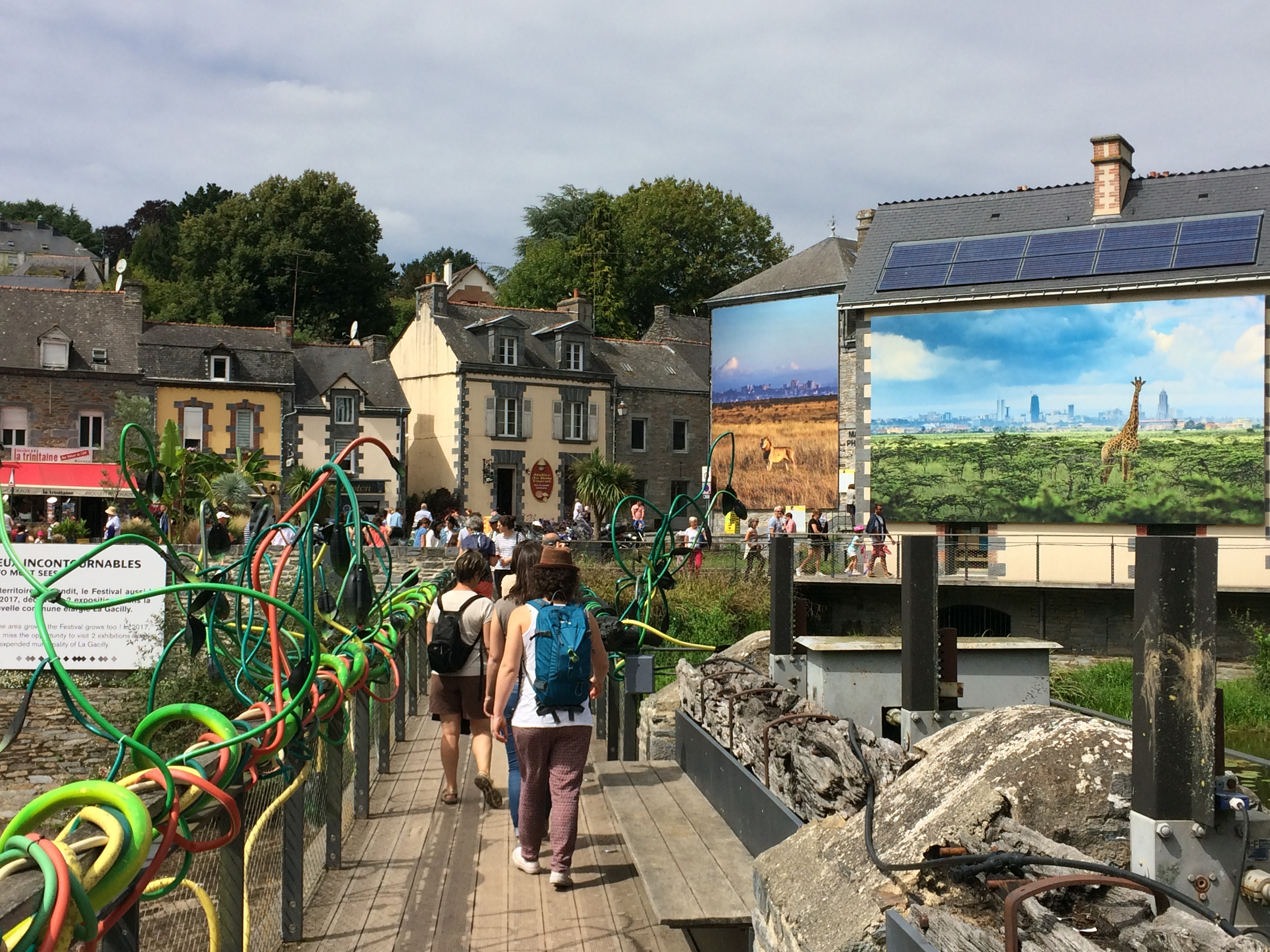
The Photo La Gacilly festival, one of the most important artistic events of the 2000s.

In the 2000s, the region was faced with a series of events that had a negative impact on visitor numbers. Recurrent green tides, oil tanker shipwrecks (Erika in 1999, Prestige in 2002) and economic crises have given the region a poor image. At the same time, the reduction in transport costs brought about by the boom in low-cost air travel is increasing competition with other tourist destinations, and British customers are abandoning the region for other destinations in southern Europe. In all, Brittany lost a third of its foreign clientele between 2000 and 2012. This phenomenon is partially offset by the arrival of tourists from other countries, notably Germany, attracted by the popularity of Jörg Bong's Commissaire Dupin, and China, buoyed by the popularity of the Fleurs et Brume series.

Nevertheless, Brittany's image among tourists remains positive, and the region is well known internationally. Festivals such as Vieilles Charrues and the Interceltique de Lorient also achieved a certain level of recognition in the 2000s. Local productions and companies, united since 1993 in the Produit en Bretagne association, also contribute to the region's positive image. A move upmarket is also proposed to attract new clientele. Arts-related events such as the Photo La Gacilly festival, the Fonds Hélène et Édouard Leclerc pour la culture in Landerneau, and the Domaine de Kerguéhennec are just a few examples.

== Institutional framework ==
Map of the Brittany destination and its 10 structuring areas, as defined by Atout France.

The Brittany region shares competence in the field of tourism with its constituent départements. It has a vice-president dedicated to this issue, and an operational department, the Comité Régional de Tourisme de Bretagne. Its actions are developed around 10 tourist areas, including sites in the Manche and Loire-Atlantique regions, within the framework of a destination contract drawn up with Atout France.

At the departmental level, actions are led by departmental tourism committees. More locally, 60 tourist offices cover the region, with an annual budget of 50 million euros.

The region also co-manages a place branding, the "Bretagne brand", with the regional tourism center. Created in 2011, with a logotype designed to represent the values associated with the region, it is promoted and adapted locally by local authorities and tourism stakeholders.

== Economy ==
=== Economic impact ===
Tourism-related jobs are concentrated on the coast.

In 2015, the economic spin-offs represented 8% of regional GDP. The region welcomes some 13 million visitors every year, a quarter of whom are foreign tourists, mainly British, German and Dutch. The region records 100 million overnight stays per year, two-thirds of which are in Finistère and Morbihan. In 2015, these benefits represented nearly 6.6 billion euros injected into the local economy. Activity is highly seasonal, concentrated mainly between May and September. Jobs are concentrated on the coast and in major urban centers.

In 2015, around 29% of these jobs were in accommodation, and 22% in food (14% in cafés and restaurants, and 8% in supermarkets). As the region offers a wide range of free leisure activities (natural, inland and coastal sites), spending on museums, shows and theme parks remains lower than the national average. Spending on travel is also lower than the national average (21.5% vs. 30%), due to the absence of toll freeways. Brittany is, however, the leading region in France for the sale of pleasure boats, and sales of motorhomes are higher.

In 2015, tourism generated some 66,000 direct jobs, with strong seasonal variations, ranging from 31,300 jobs in January to 68,500 in August. This seasonality of employment is also much more marked in Finistère (variation from 8,900 to 20,400 jobs) and Morbihan (variation from 7,700 to 19,200 jobs). Accommodation and catering account for almost 61% of these jobs. These sectors offer opportunities for young people and those with low levels of training. The majority of employees are women (54%). The sector is characterized by job insecurity, limited career development opportunities, and an average salary that is lower than in the rest of the commercial sector.

=== Accommodation facilities ===
The region has a diversified accommodation network. In 2020, there were around 1,000 tourist hotels, 750 campsites, and some 10,000 furnished and bed-and-breakfast establishments.

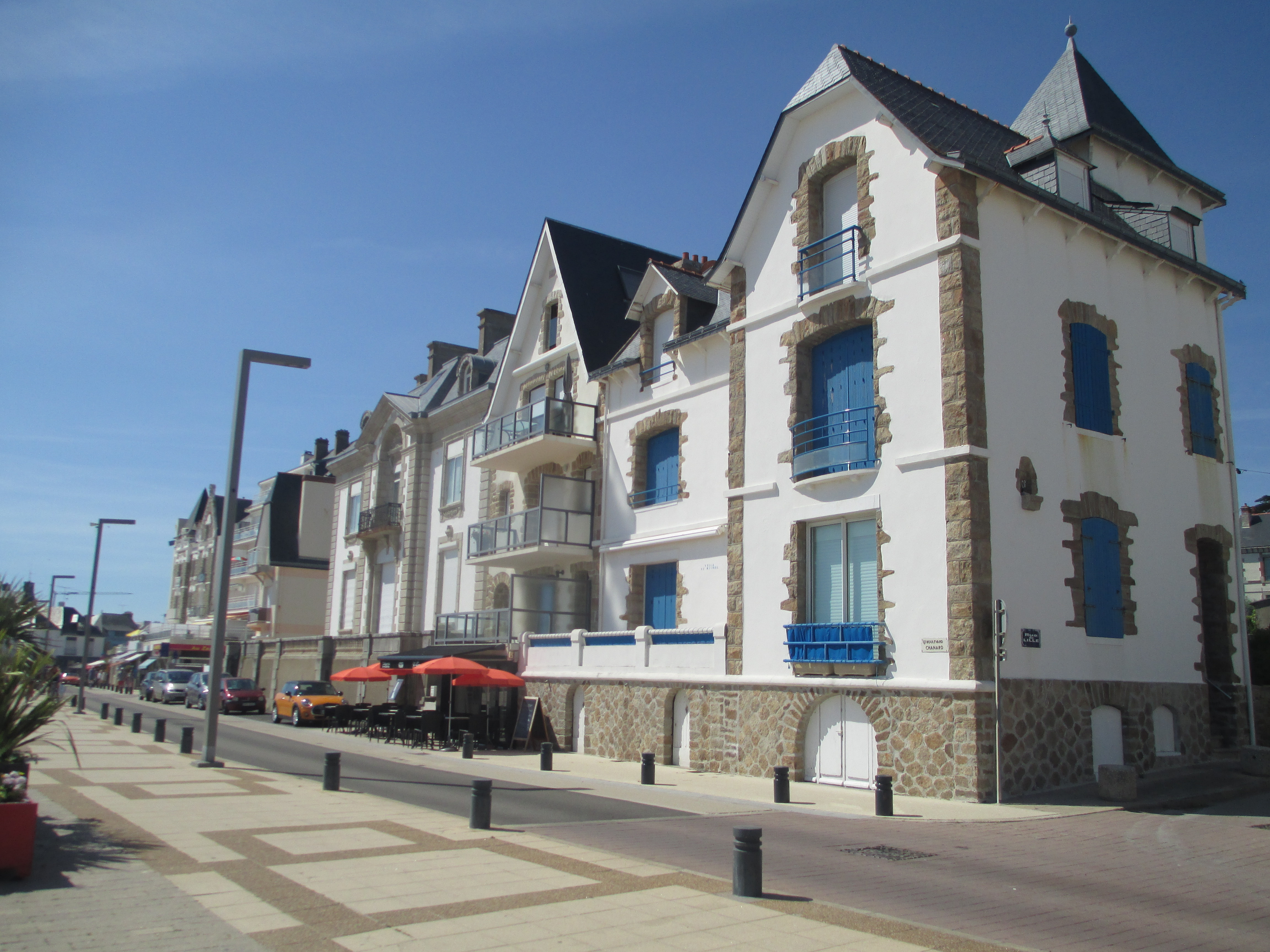
Holiday cottage in Quiberon, identifiable by their closed shutters in the off-season.

Accommodation sites like Airbnb are also active in the region. The latter offered nearly 21,000 accommodations in 2017, most of them spread along the coast, and reached 410,000 travelers the previous year, for an estimated economic impact of 261 million euros, or 1,900 euros per accommodation. This boom has led to local overtourism, as in Saint-Malo and Douarnenez, making accommodation unaffordable for the local population, or leading to a decline in the local quality of life.

The region also has around 8% of holiday cottage, the 5th highest rate among French regions. These are concentrated along the coast, and in some towns the rate can rise to over 80%. They are occupied for an average of 139,5 days a year, each generating €11,350 in annual spin-offs. Their number is a source of criticism, and they are accused of driving up property prices to the point of making them unaffordable for local residents.

=== Trade ===
Tourism in the region gives rise to the production and sale of souvenirs aimed at the tourist clientele. The Breton bowl is one of the best-selling products. When it comes to clothing, the most popular items are vareuses, yellow oilskins, marinières and Breton-patterned garments. Food products include gourmet foods such as kouign-amann and canned seafood, as well as Breton whiskies and ciders.

Tourism is also behind the boom in crêperies, particularly since the 1970s. Of the 4,000 such establishments in France, 1,600 to 1,800 are located in Brittany.

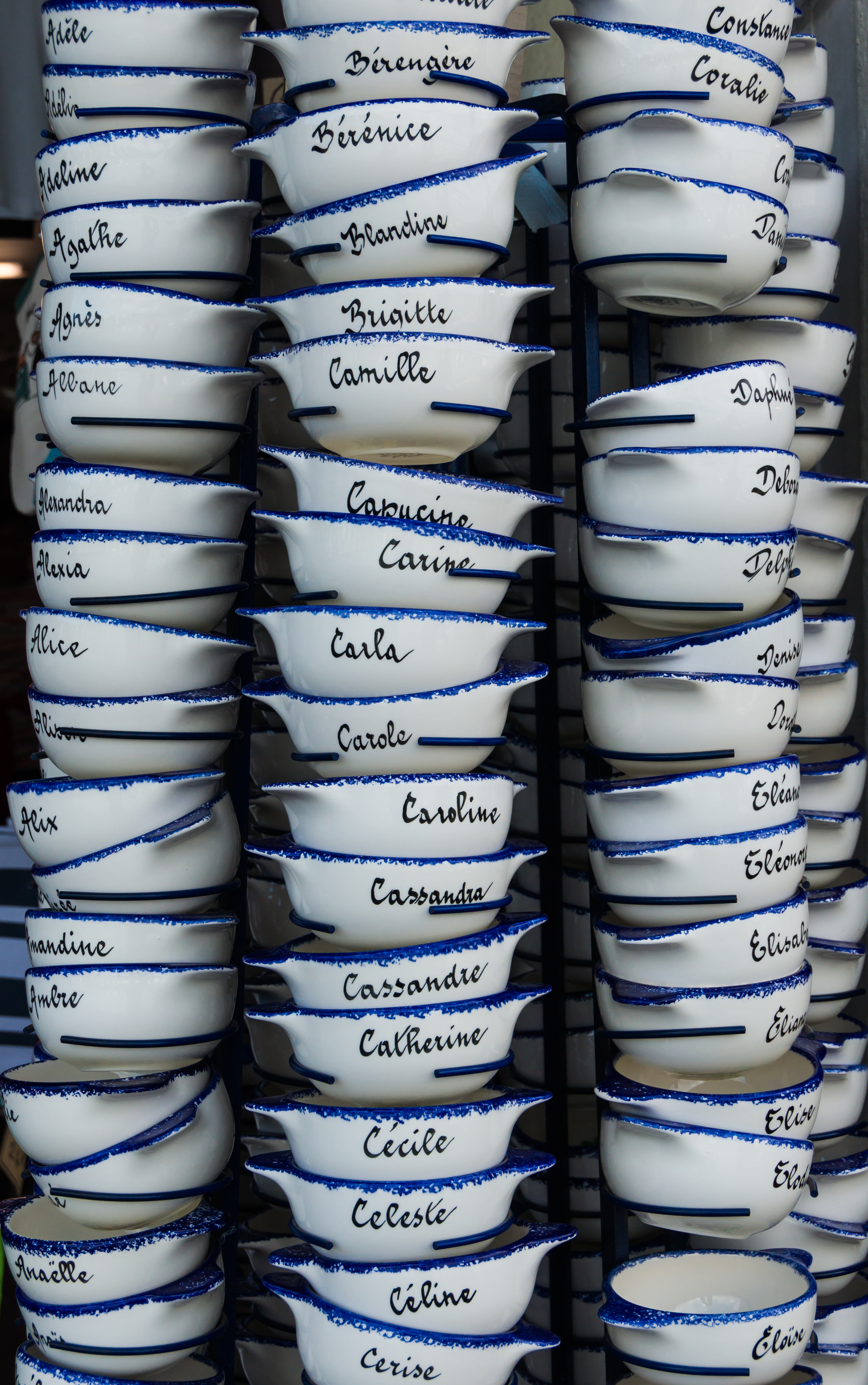

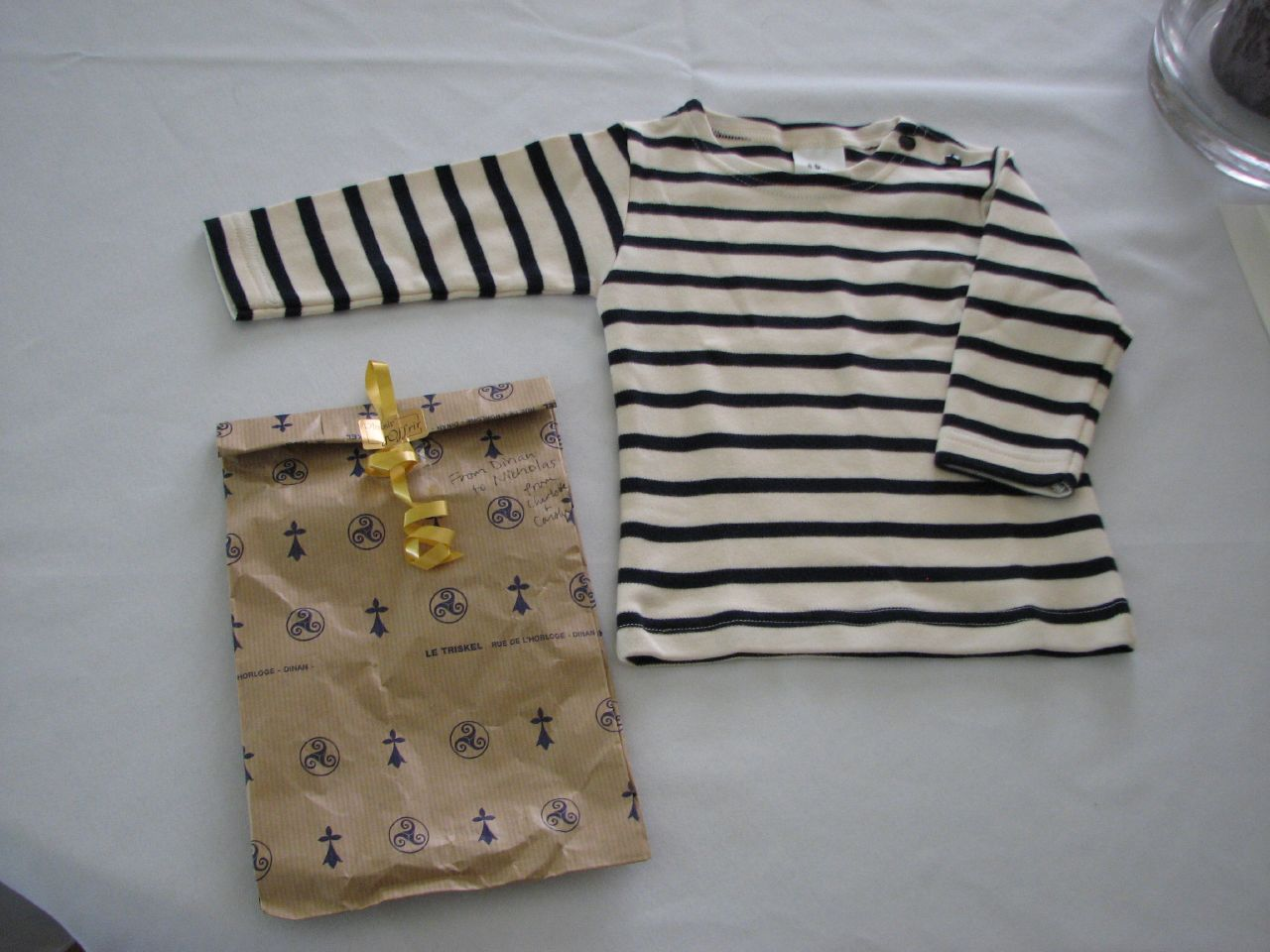
Marinière

Cider.

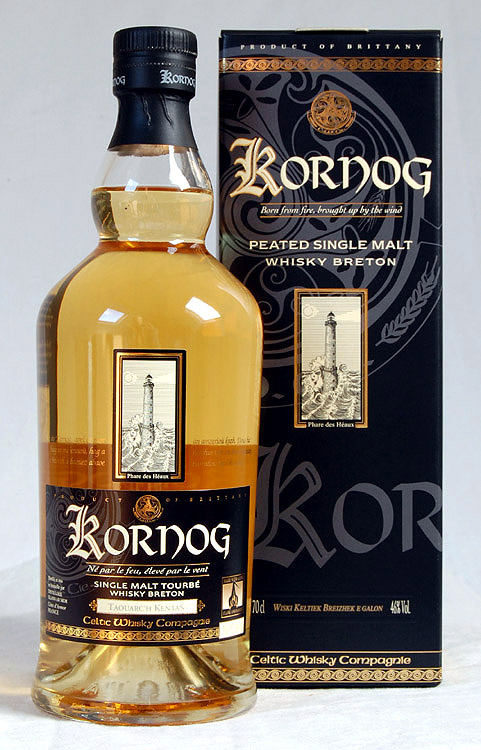
Breton whisky.

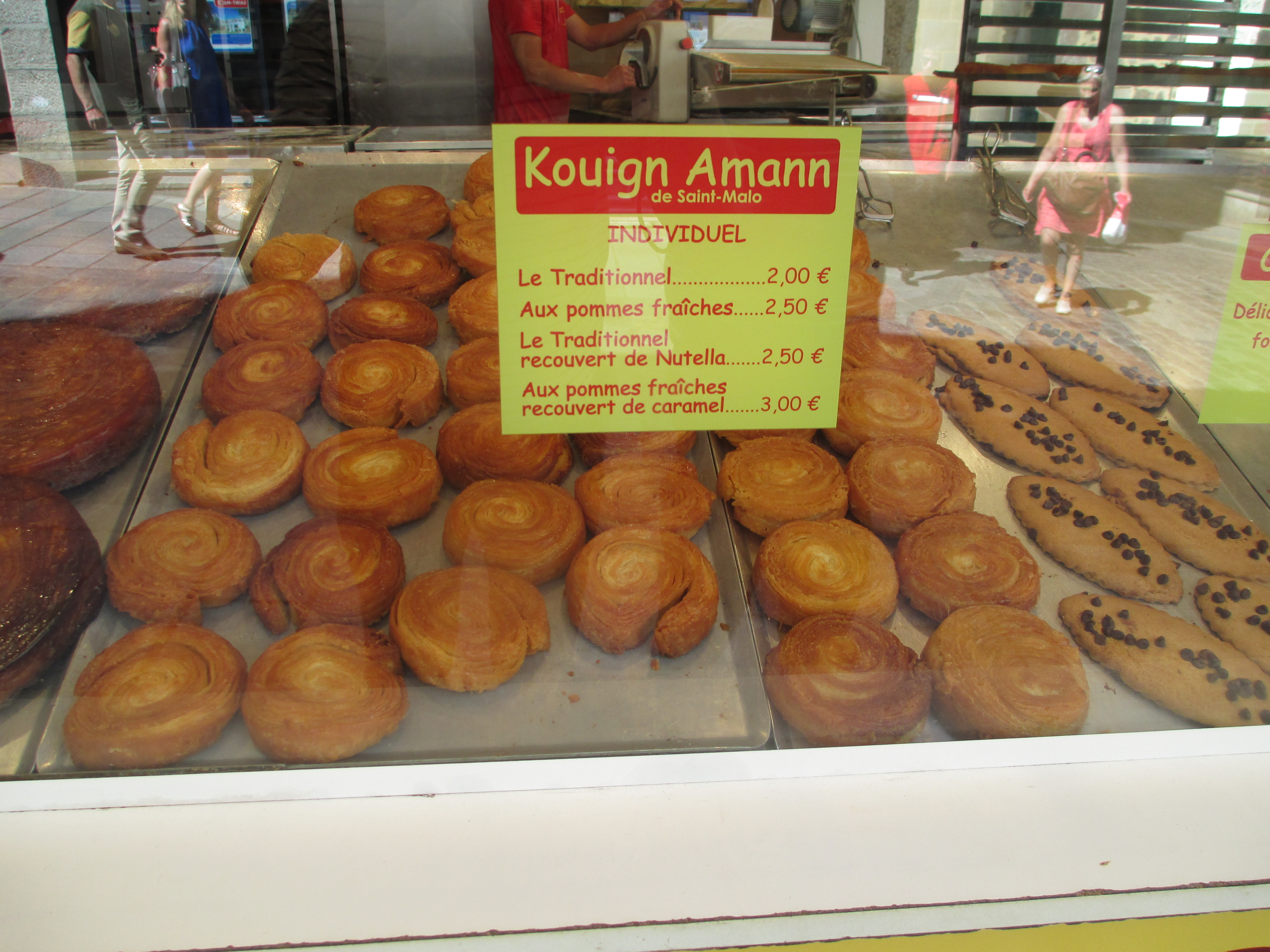
Kouign-amann.

== Typology of local tourism ==
=== Urban tourism ===
Brittany's seven largest cities are home to a form of urban tourism, often in the form of a city break lasting a few days. The urban units of Rennes, Brest, Saint-Malo, Lorient, Quimper, Vannes and Saint-Brieuc account for half of the region's hotel supply, and are served by a full range of transport services (LGV Bretagne for all these cities, airport hubs in Brest and Rennes, Saint-Malo ferry terminal with links to the UK).

Cultural tourism is on the rise. Most of these seven towns are part of the Villes et Pays d'art et d'histoire network, thanks to their architectural heritage, and some are close to UNESCO World Heritage sites (Vauban tower for Brest, Mont Saint-Michel for Saint-Malo, Carnac stones for Vannes). Museums are less attractive, with no structure in the region recording more than 100,000 visitors per year for its permanent exhibitions. However, some sites stand out by exceeding this threshold for temporary exhibitions (musée départemental breton in Quimper, Fonds Hélène et Édouard Leclerc pour la culture in Landerneau, near Brest).

These activities are often complemented by shopping, with the cities of Rennes and Saint-Malo accounting for the bulk of this offer, or excursions to their hinterlands, notably for heritage and/or maritime tourism, or to the region's main festivals.

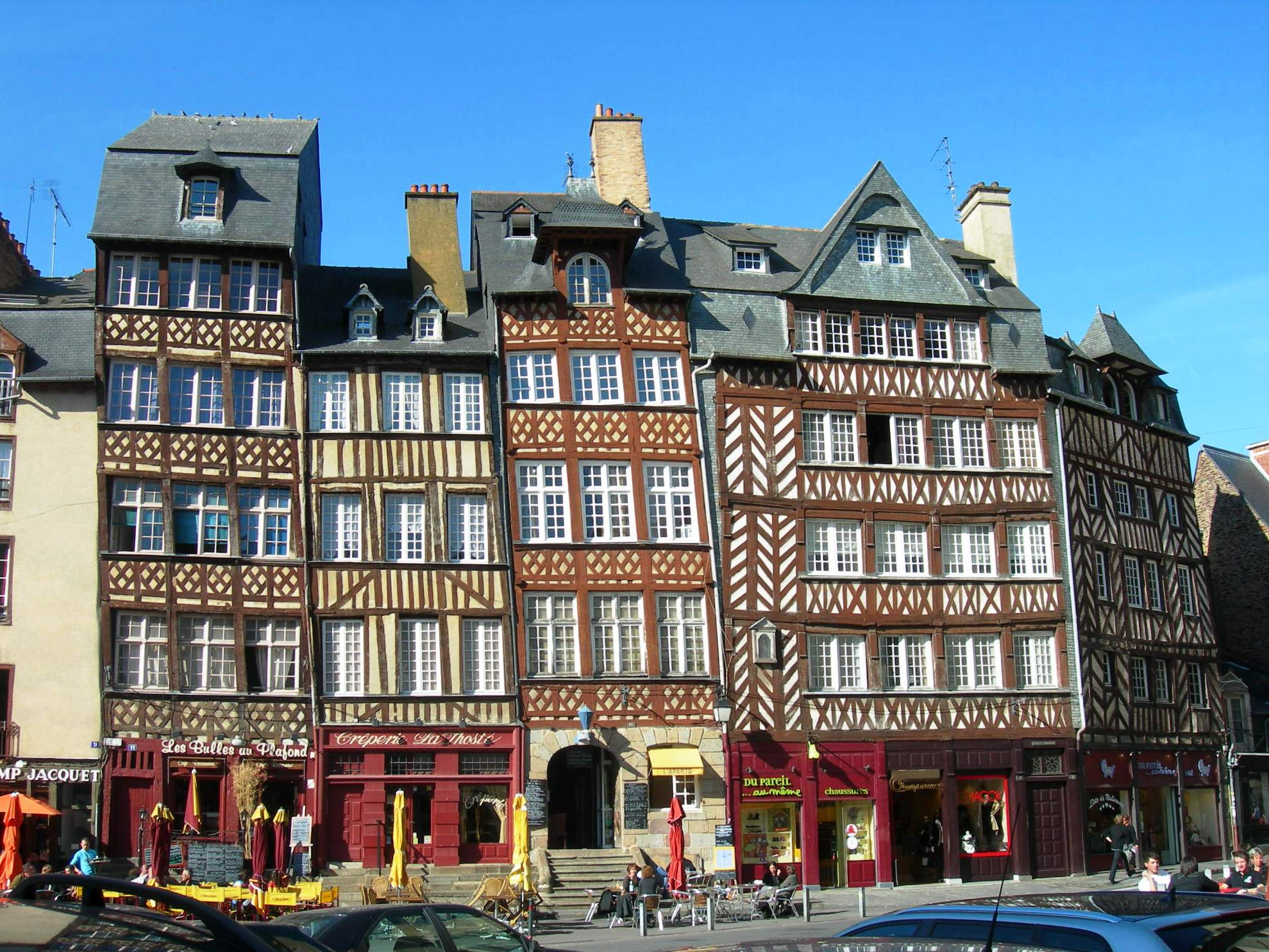
Rennes.

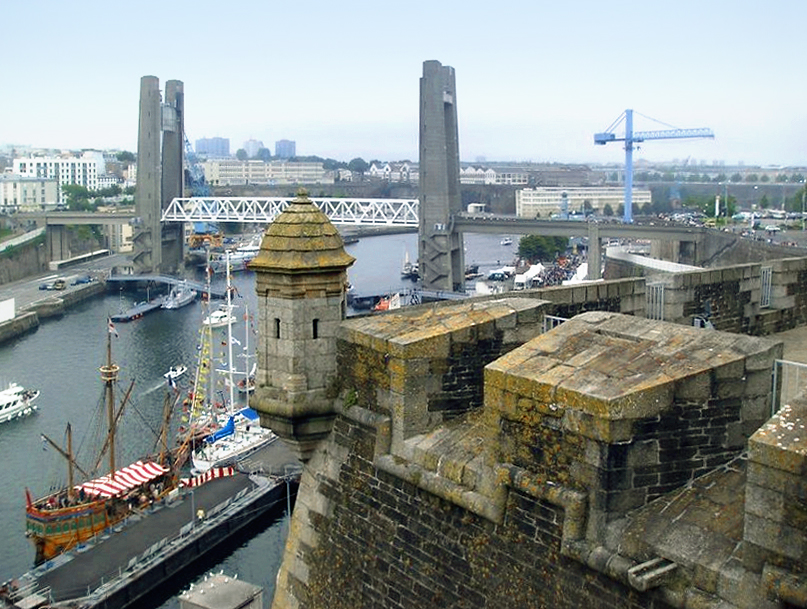
Brest.

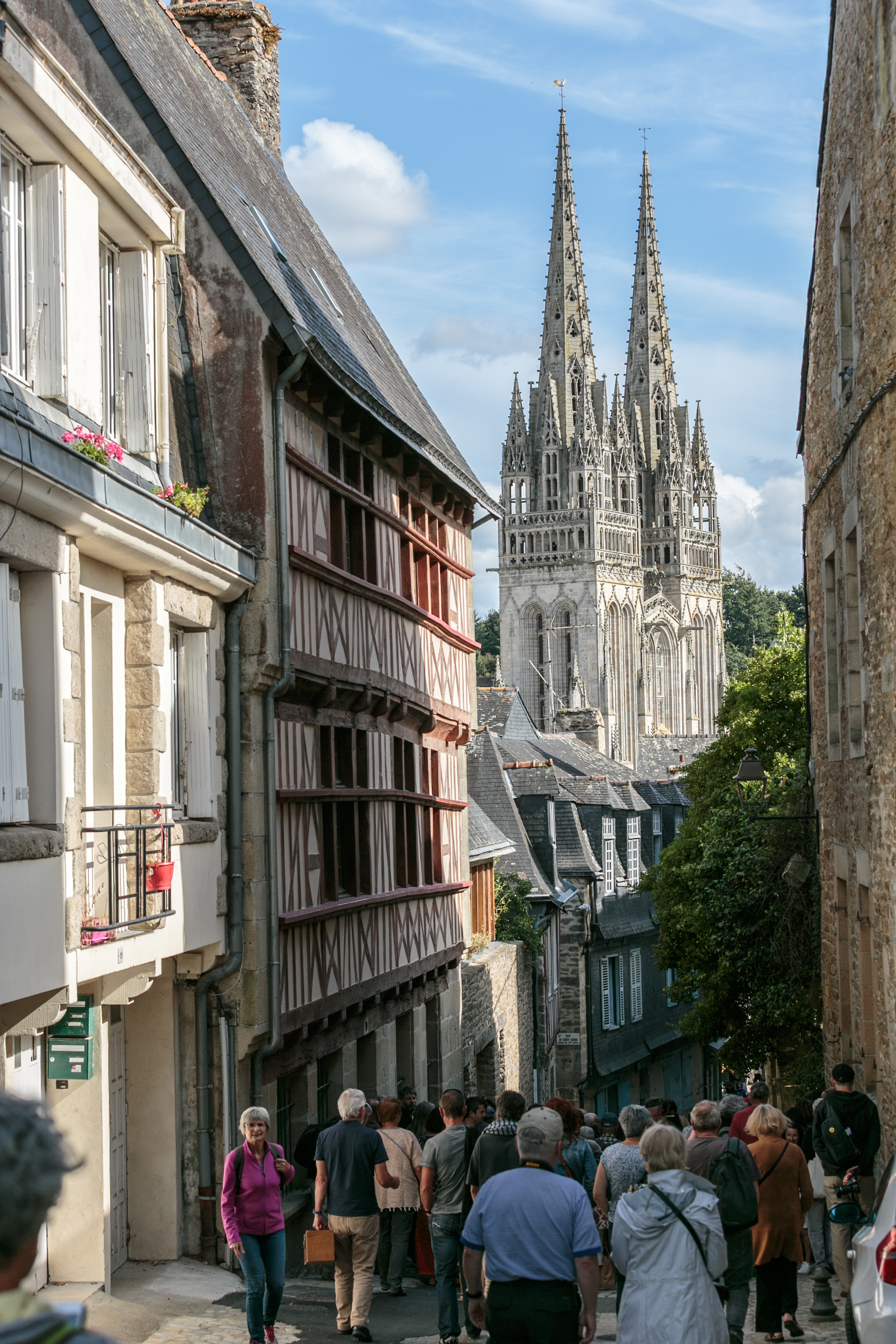
Quimper.

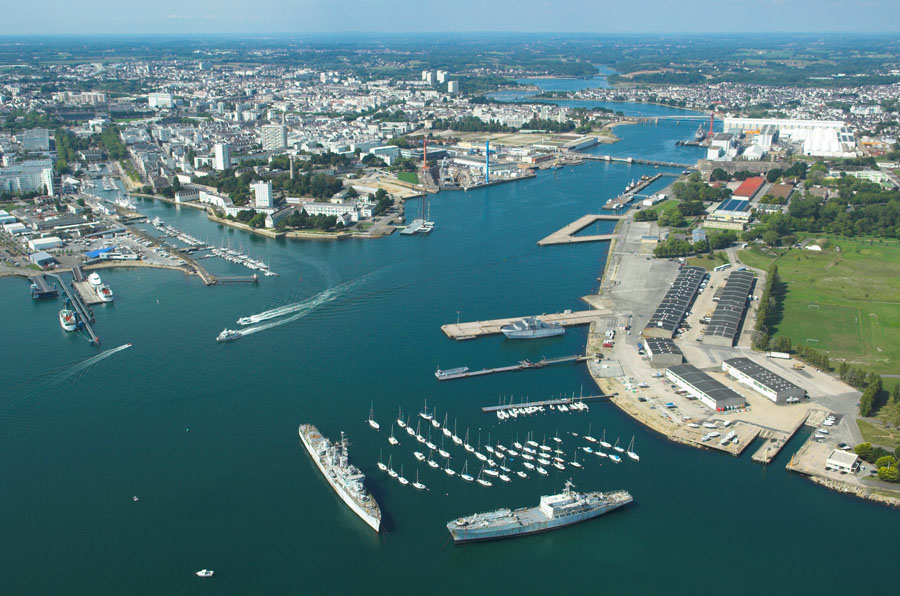
Lorient.

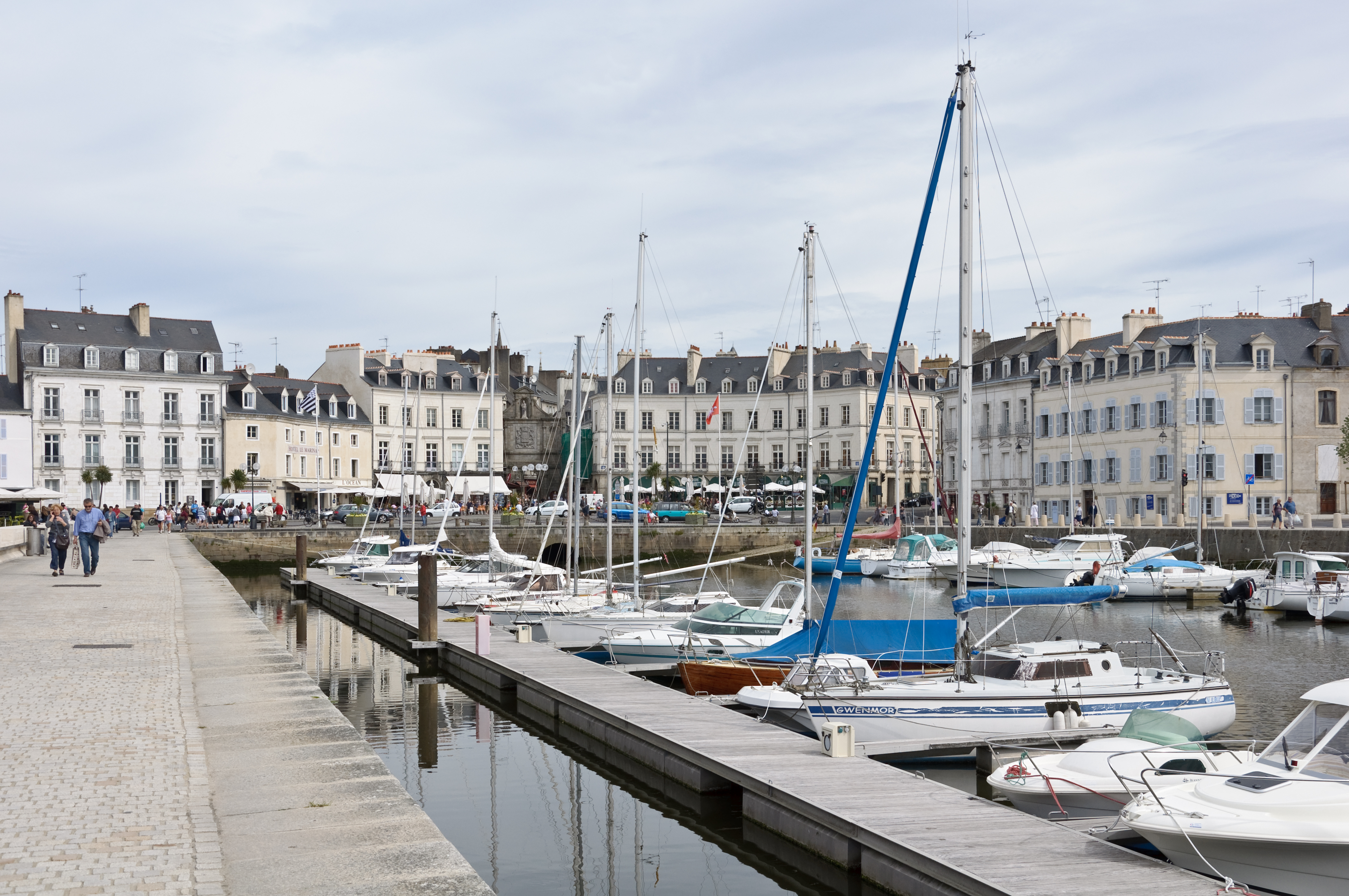
Vannes.

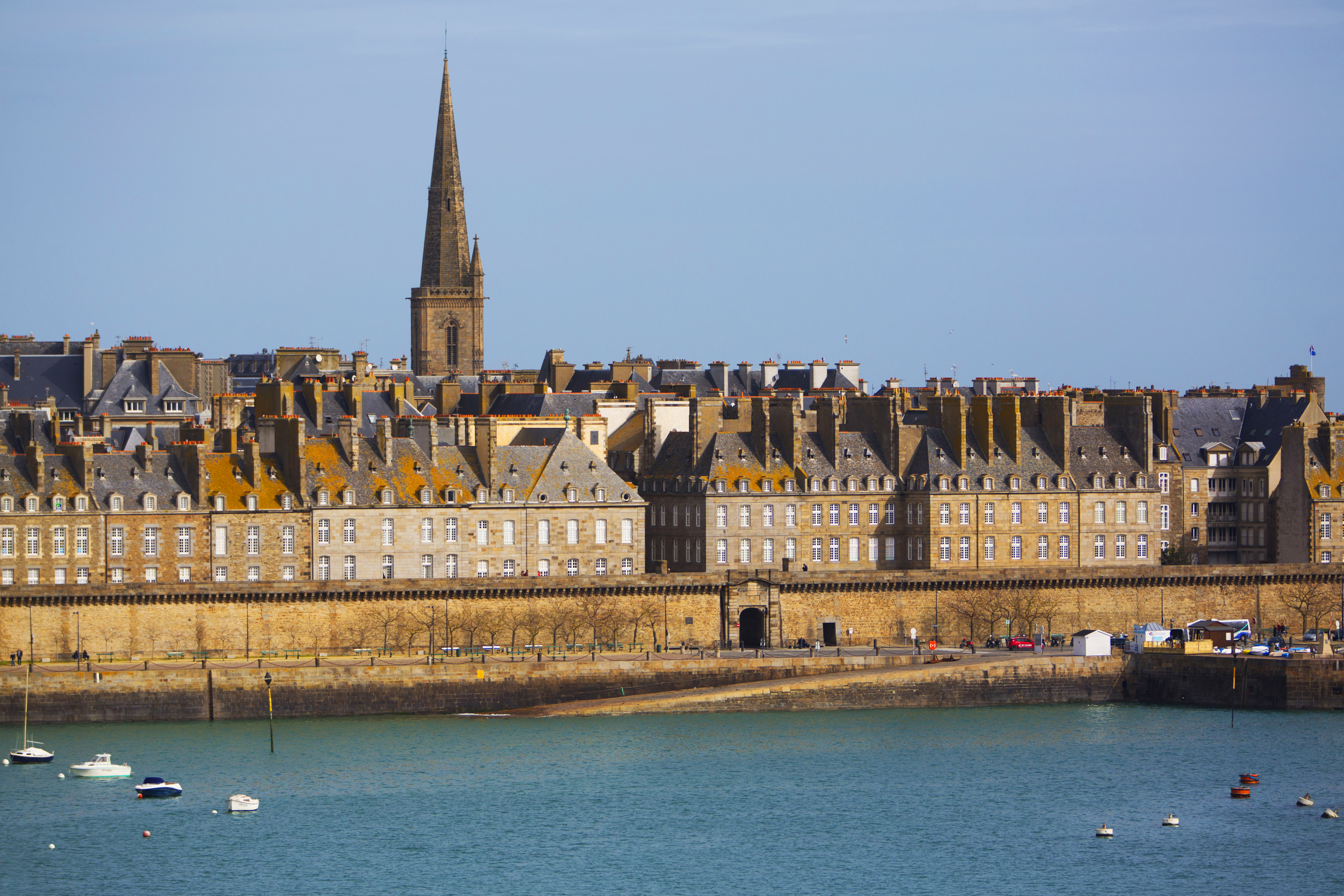
Saint-Malo.

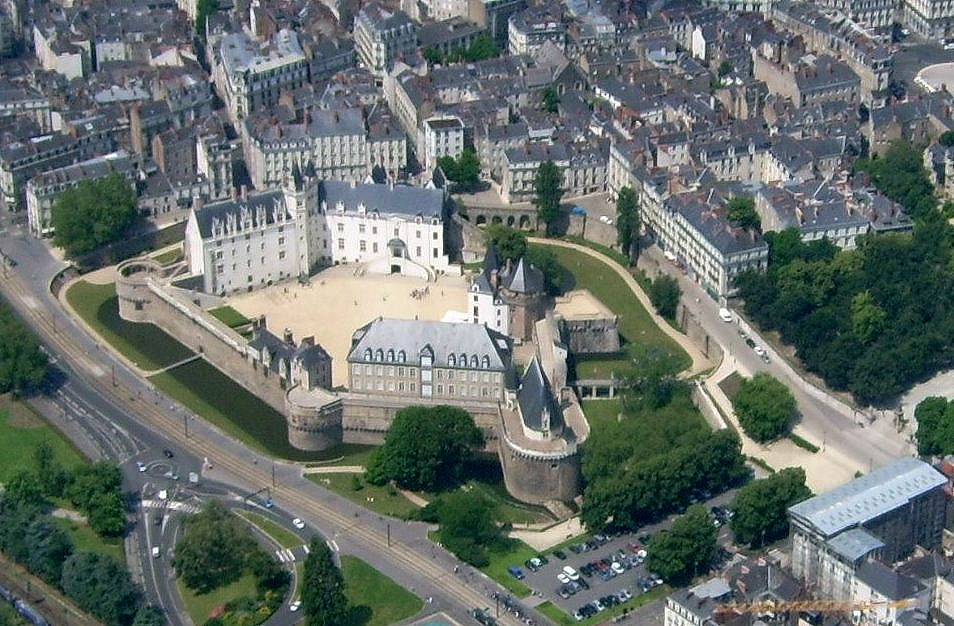
Nantes.

=== Maritime tourism ===
The region has 2,700 km of coastline, or 42% of the French coastline, which has a major influence on its appeal to tourists. Nautical tourism has a strong presence here, with some 43,800 boat berths in 114 coastal ports in 2015, representing 23% of national berths. The region ranks second in France, just behind the PACA region, and with Sailing Valley has the largest network of nautical companies in France.

A number of tourist sites draw on the region's maritime character, highlighting its flora and fauna (Océanopolis in Brest, Great Aquarium in Saint-Malo), its heritage (Musée National de la Marine in Brest, Musée de la Compagnie des Indes in Port-Louis), its naval heritage (Cité de la Voile Éric Tabarly in Lorient), or through a dense network of seaside resorts. Other sites can take advantage of maritime phenomena (high tides on the Silon dike in Saint-Malo, swell for surfing at Pointe de la Torche). More broadly, the region's tourism offer includes numerous islands and beaches.

This theme can also be found at annual or multi-year events. Some ocean race starts can also attract several hundred thousand visitors (Jules Verne Trophy in Brest, Route du Rhum in Saint-Malo, stages of The Ocean Race in Lorient), as can certain maritime festivals (Fête Maritime in Brest, Semaine du Golfe in the Gulf of Morbihan).

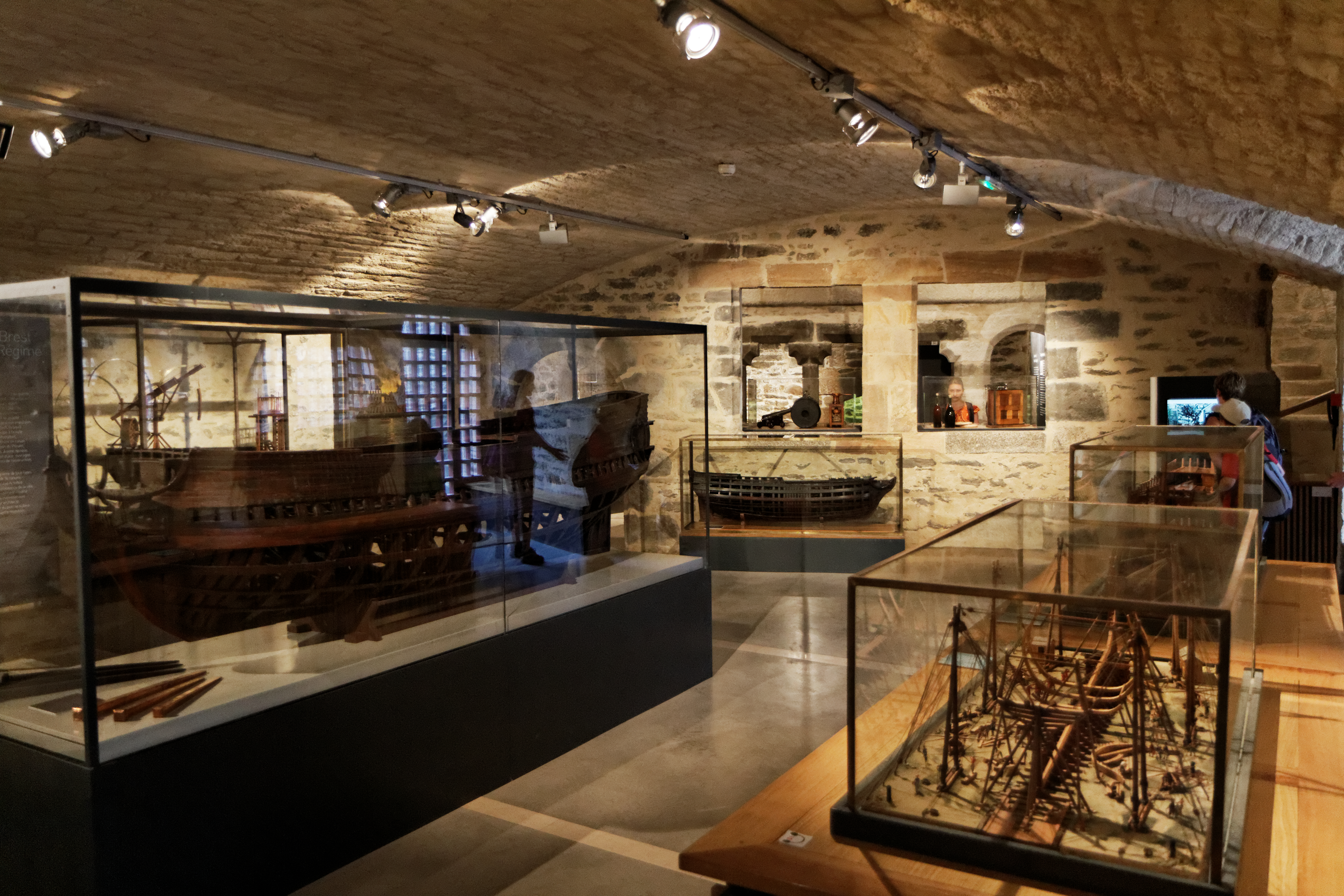
Hall of the Musée National de la Marine, Brest.

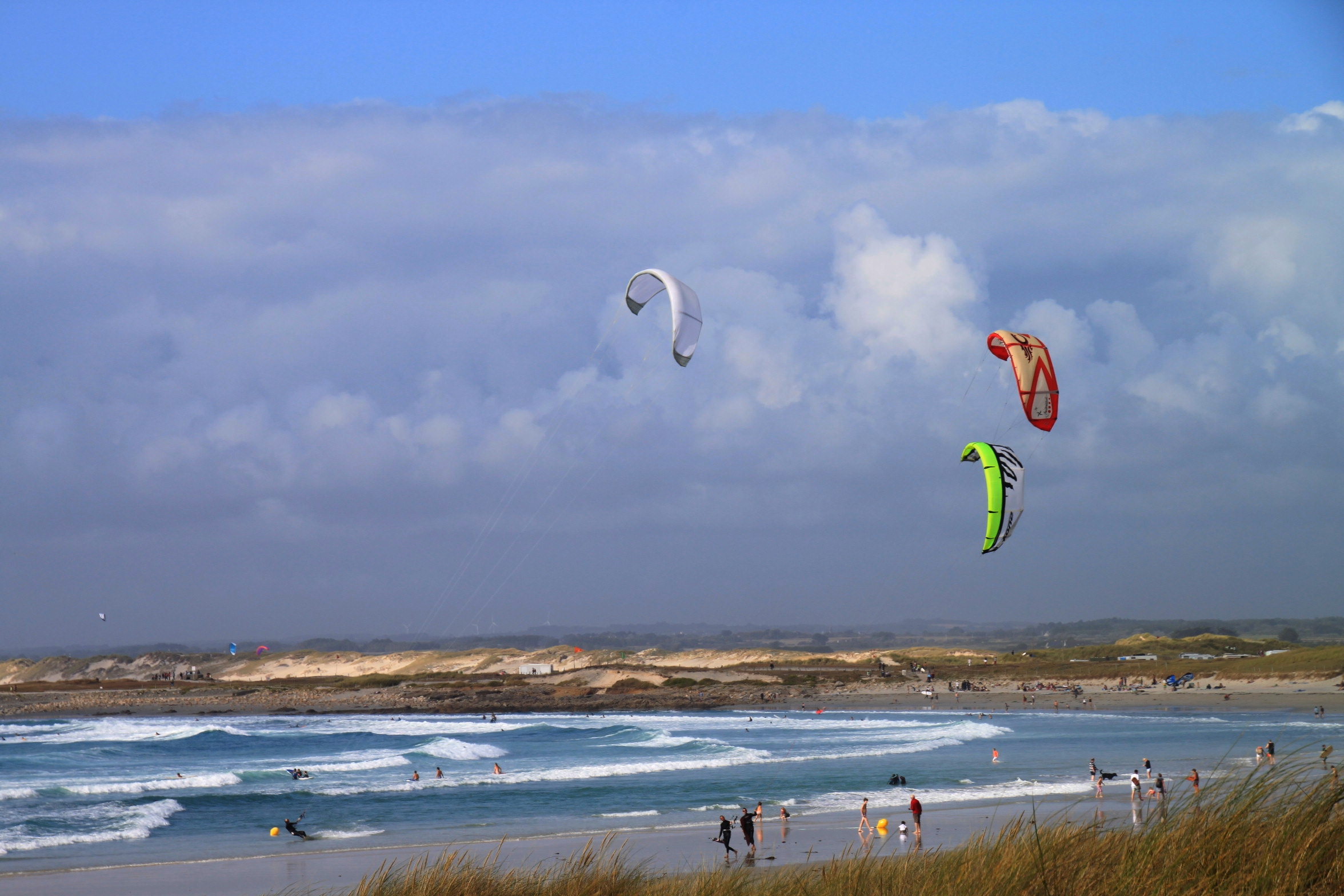
Kitsurfing on Pointe de la Torche.

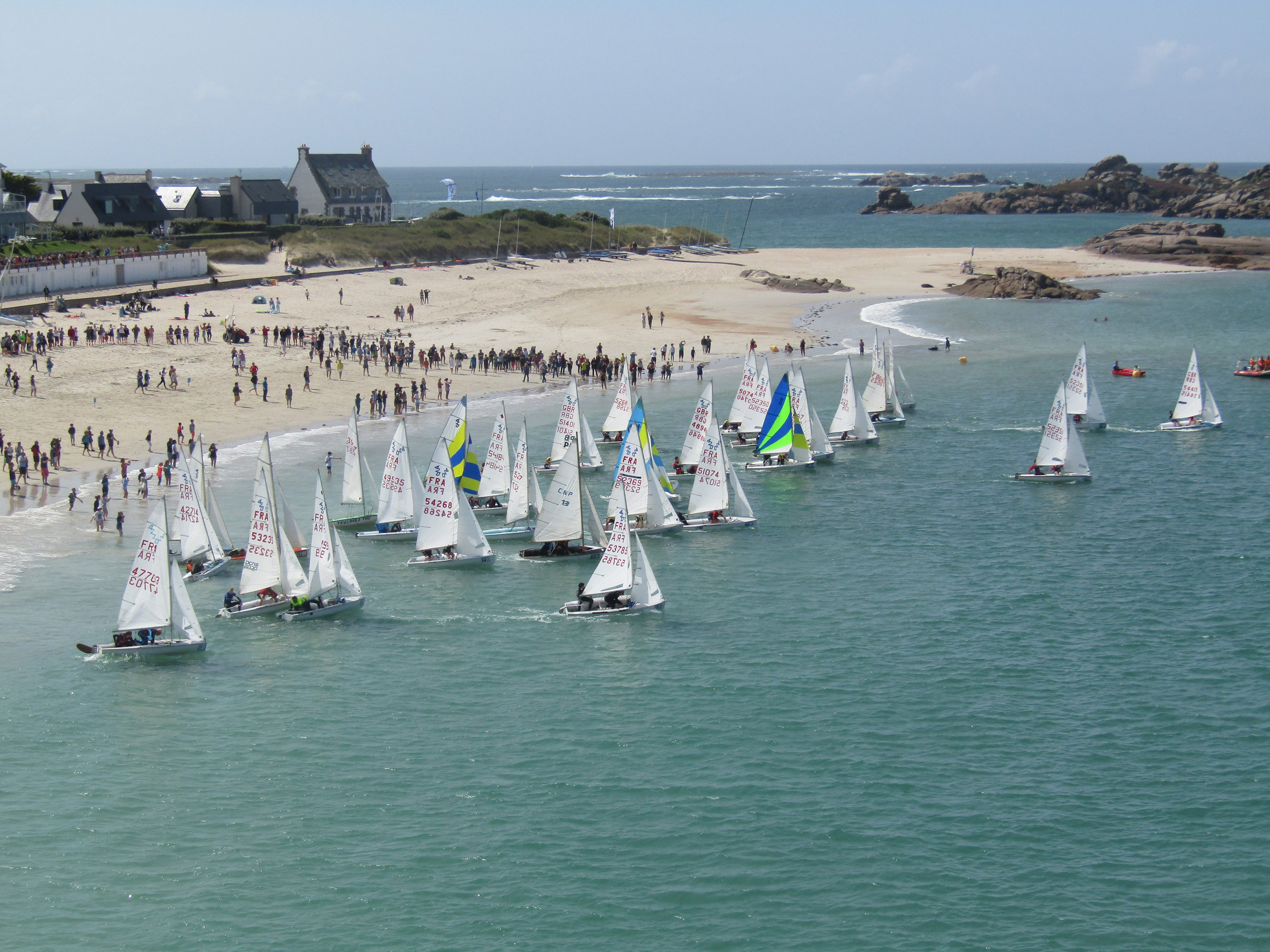
Sailing school in Trégastel.

=== Eco tourism ===
River tourism in Brittany is concentrated around three main routes: the Nantes-Brest canal, the Ille-et-Rance canal and the Vilaine, and along the Blavet, for a total of 675 km of navigable waterways. Around 3,480 boat movements were recorded in 2018, for average stays of 15 days. This mode of travel is often combined with other soft modes such as cycling or walking, with river navigation accounting for 9 of these 15 days. One-third of customers are foreign. Among French customers, residents of the Brittany and Pays de la Loire regions account for 2/3 of visitors. Economic spin-offs are estimated at 7.3 million euros in 2018.

The region has just over 2,000 km of Voie vertes and cycle paths in 2018, 54% of which are on dedicated sites, with the remainder on shared sites. These can be used by pedestrians or cyclists. The number of trips is estimated at 5.4 million in 2018, including 4 million for day-trippers and 1.4 million for tourists. Three-quarters of these trips are made on foot, and a quarter by bike. Annual economic spin-offs are estimated at 120 million euros in 2018. Visitor numbers are concentrated on the southern coastal route (V5), EuroVelo 1 and EuroVelo 4.

Hiking is also represented, notably on the 34 long-distance hiking trail, which runs 1,700 km along the coast from Mont-Saint-Michel to Saint-Nazaire. Visited by 9 million people every year, it generates some 202 million euros in annual spin-offs.

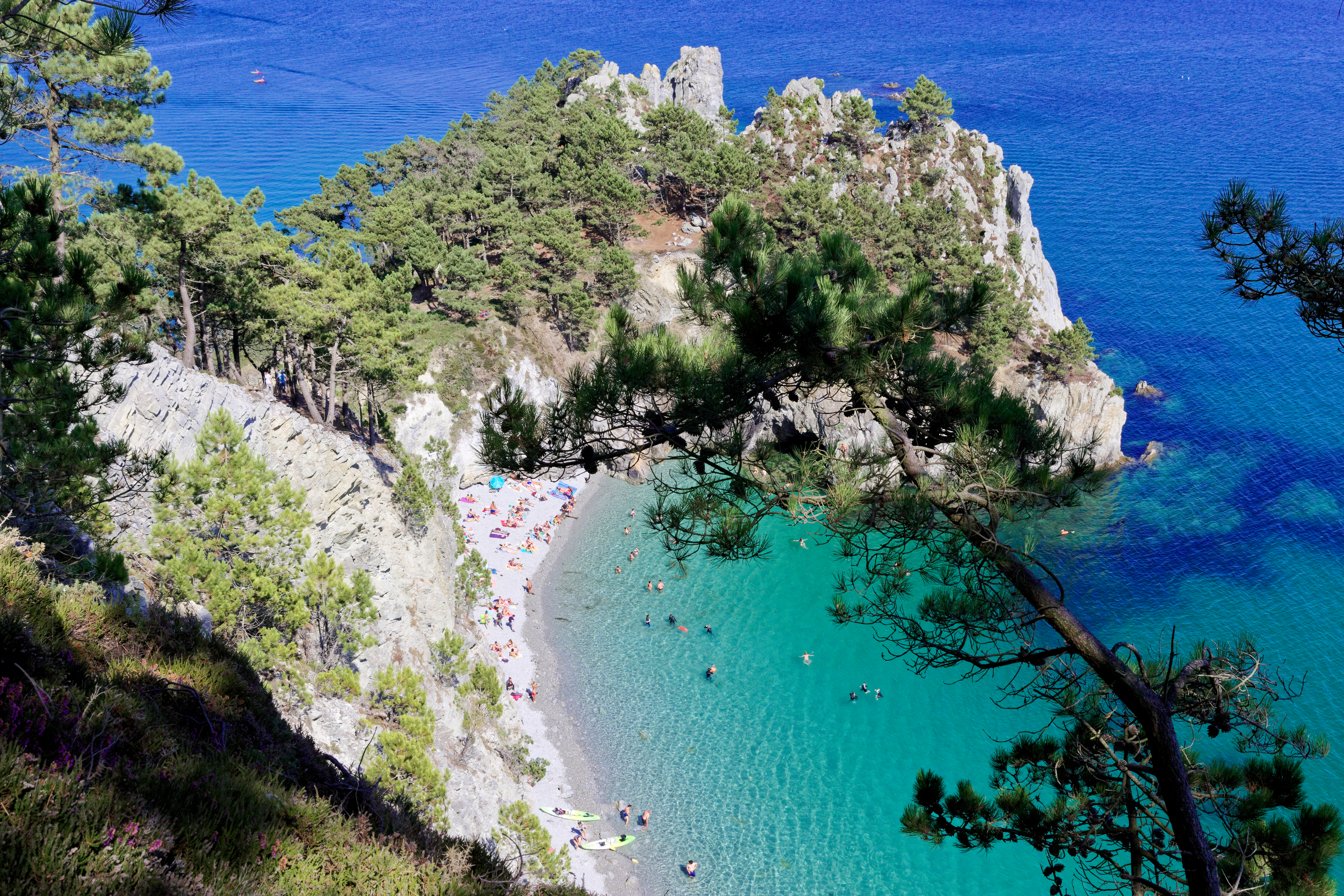
La pointe de Saint-Hernot or l'île Vierge, with its small cove and beach, between Morgat and Cap de la Chèvre, a site crossed by the GR 34.

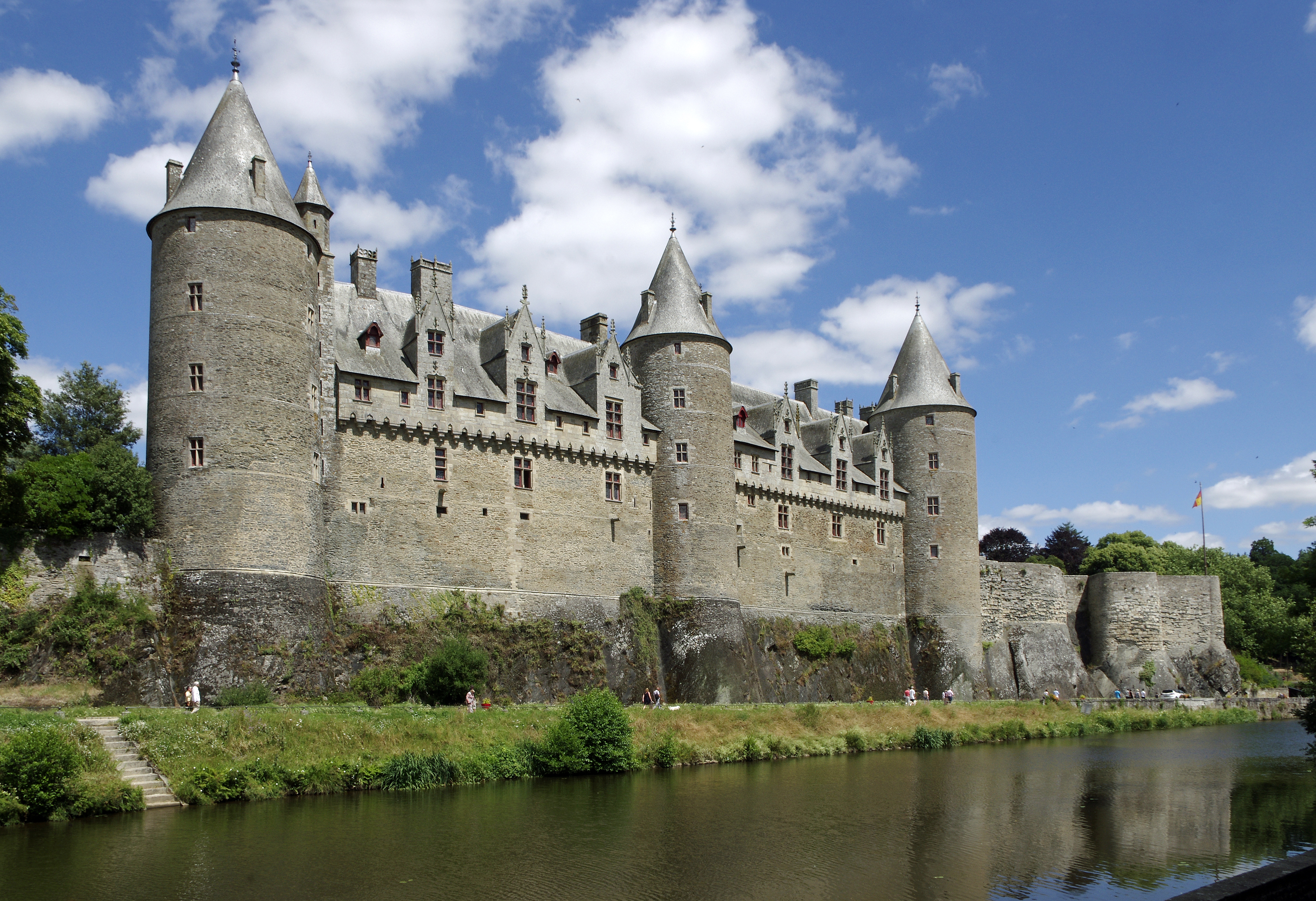
Château de Josselins overlooking the Nantes-Brest canal.

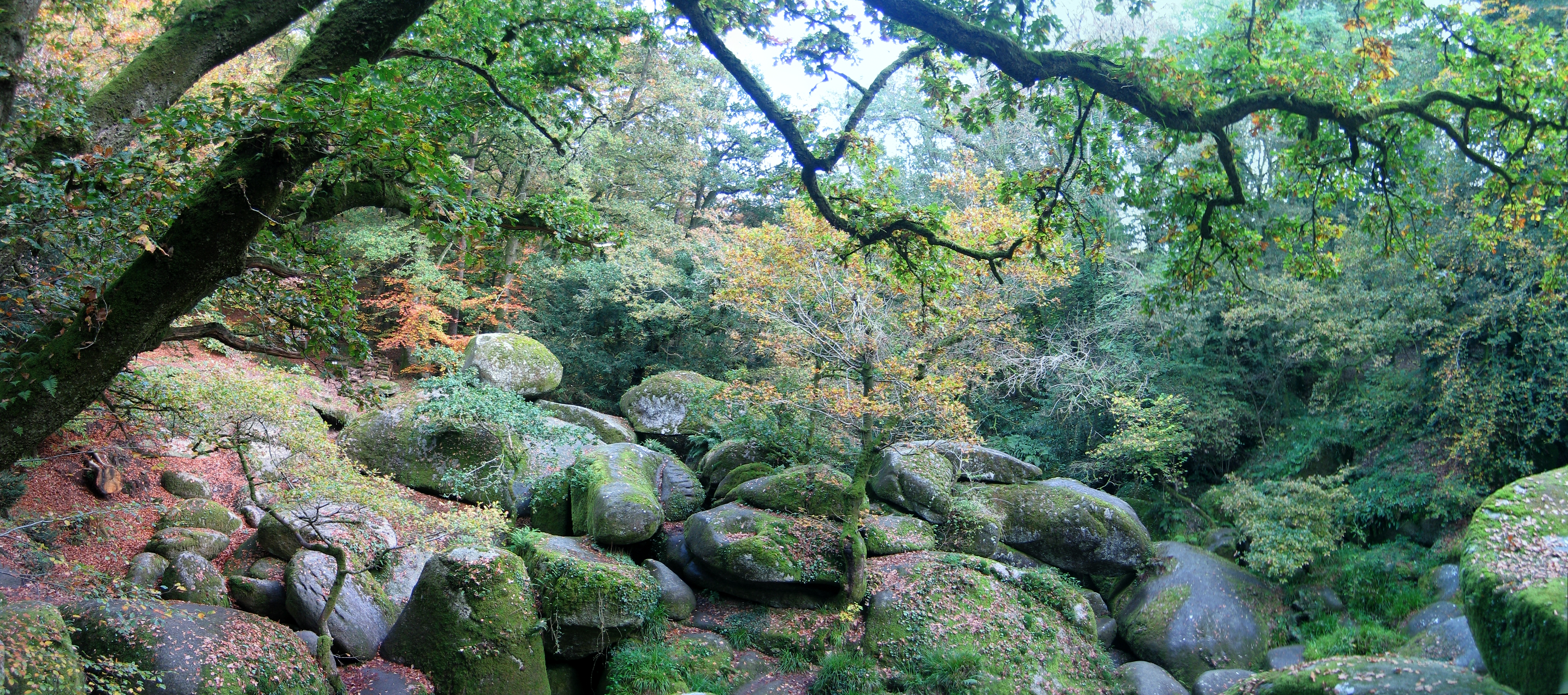
Chaos d'Huelgoat, a hiking site in the Monts d'Arrée.

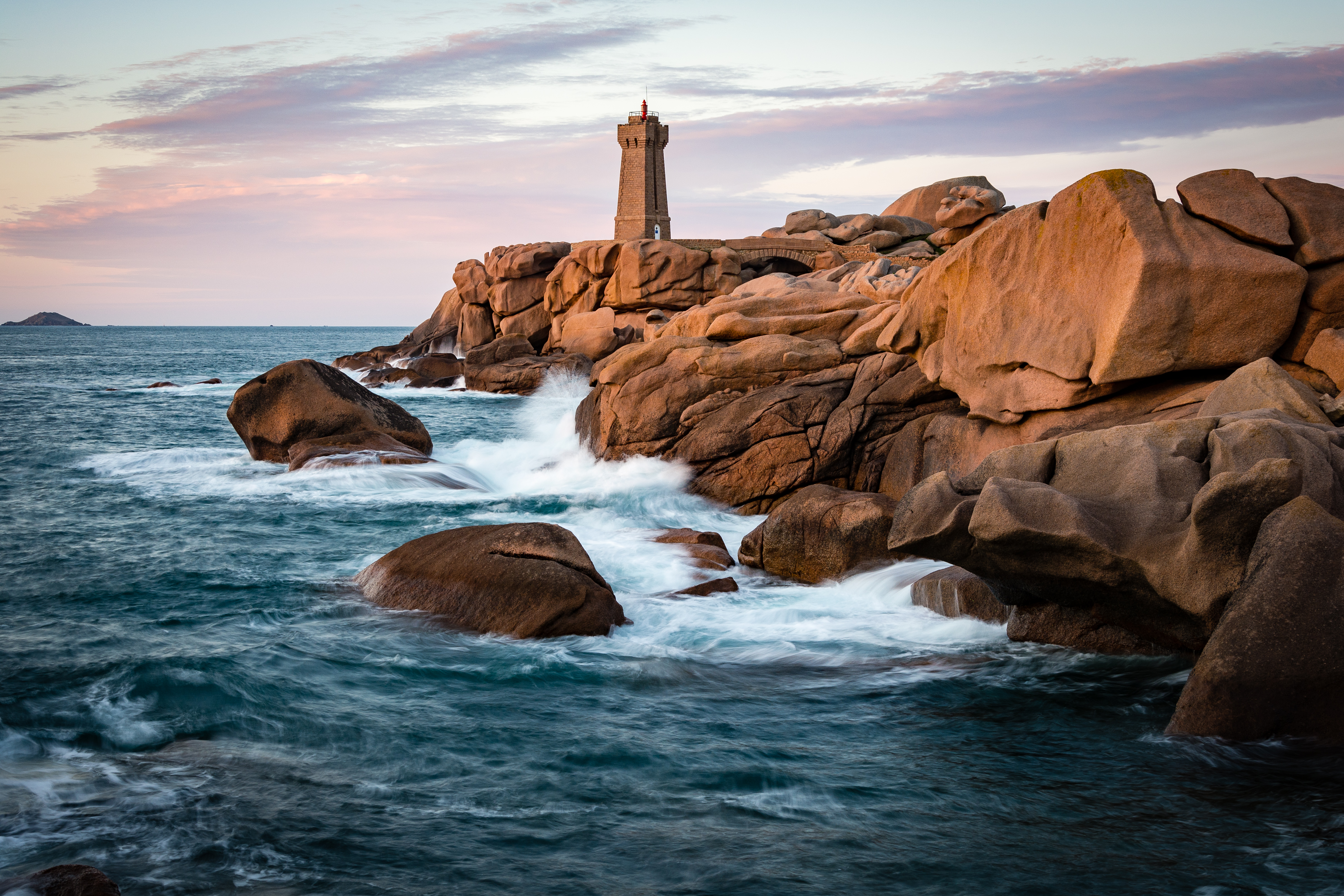
Ploumanac'h lighthouse on the GR 34.

=== Business tourism ===
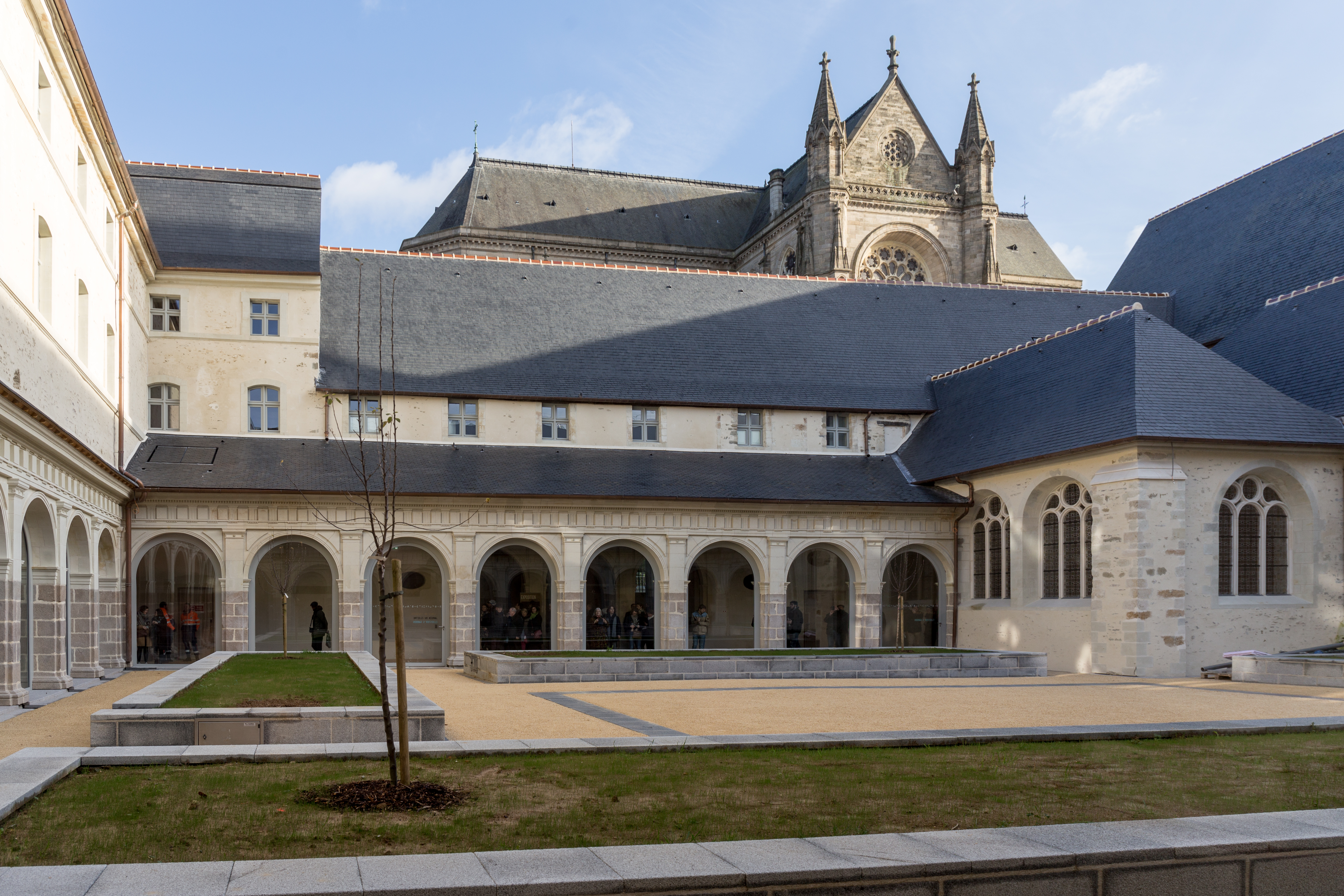
The Convent of the Jacobins in Rennes, Brittany's most recent major business tourism center.

A handful of towns are home to most of the major facilities specifically dedicated to business tourism: the Jacobins Convent in Rennes, or the Palais du Grand Large in Saint-Malo. Most business meetings, however, take place in hotels, bed & breakfasts or other types of accommodation.

Half of the overnight stays recorded in the region's seven main urban areas are related to business tourism, with the exception of Saint-Malo, which remains dominated by leisure tourism. The average cost is 54 euros per day per participant. Around 32% of these events are recurrent from one year to the next.

In the first half of 2018, Ille-et-Vilaine accounted for just under half of the 16,000 business events registered. Of these, 88% were company meetings or conventions. Around 56% of organizers come from the region, with 17% coming from Île-de-France, 15% from the Greater West of France, and 13% from the rest of France. While public and private companies represent 74% of sponsors, associations account for 15% of events.

== Major business hubs ==
=== Main destinations ===
==== Leisure centers ====
The region has several major leisure destinations. In the zoological field, Brest's Océanopolis (400,000 admissions per year) and Saint-Malo's Great Aquarium (356,000 admissions per year) are the most attractive aquariums, while the Zoo and Botanical Garden of Branféré (280,000 admissions) is the most popular zoo. The region also has a number of amusement parks: La Récré des 3 Curés, near Brest, records 200,000 admissions a year, and Kingoland in Plumelin just over 100,000.

The region also has an extensive network of leisure facilities and service providers. There are 40 golf courses in the four départements of Brittany, as well as 15 thalassotherapy centers. There are also over 95 marinas along the coast, and more than 760 water sports service providers.

Brittany is also home to over 220 festivals. Themes range from the sea (Brest Maritime Festival, Paimpol maritime song festival) to Breton culture (Lorient Interceltic Festival, Cornouaille festival) to contemporary music (Vieilles Charrues Festival in Carhaix, Rencontres Trans Musicales in Rennes). The largest of these, the Lorient Interceltic Festival (750,000 visitors) and the Vieilles Charrues Festival (283,000 visitors), generate significant economic spin-offs for their regions.

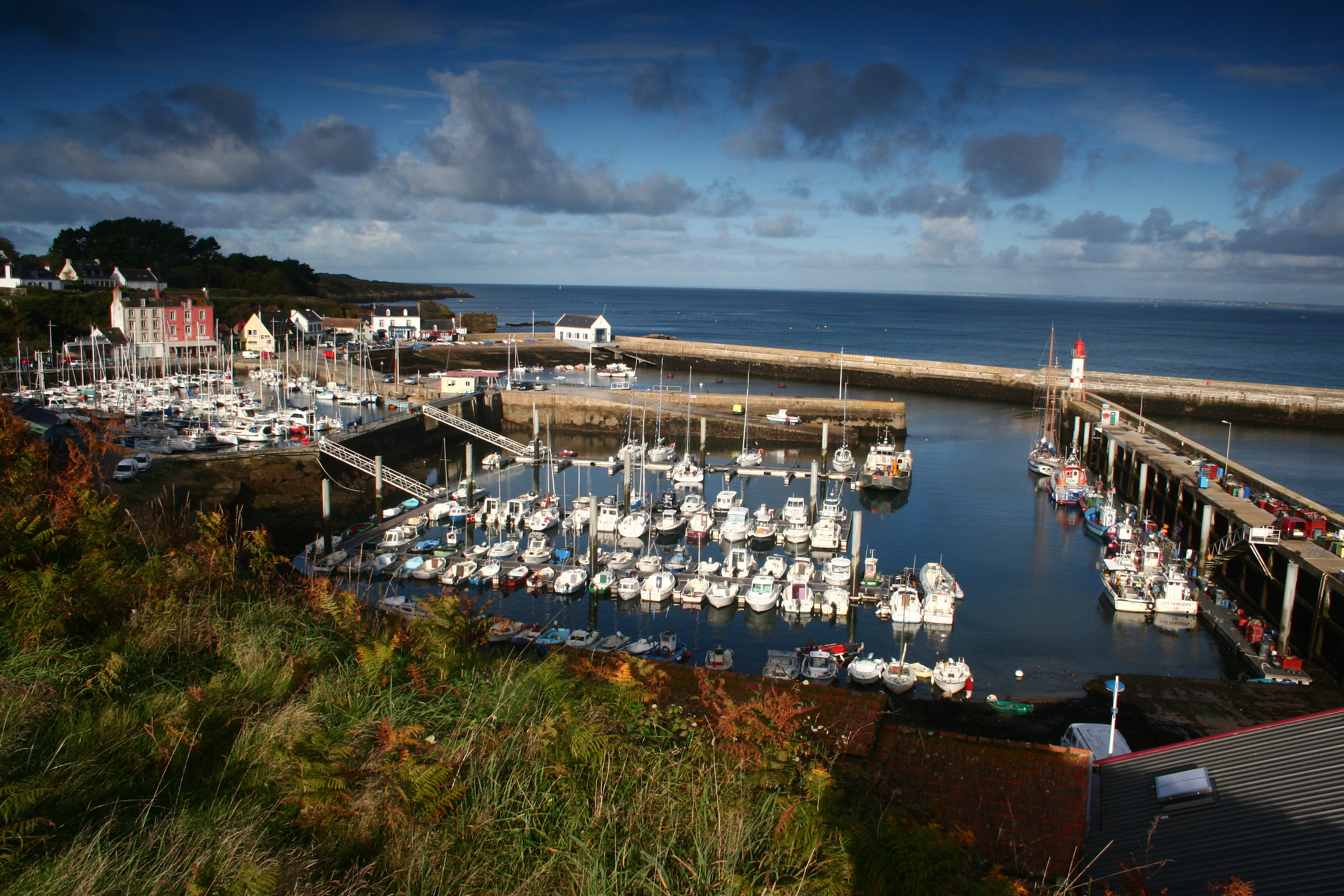
Groix marina.

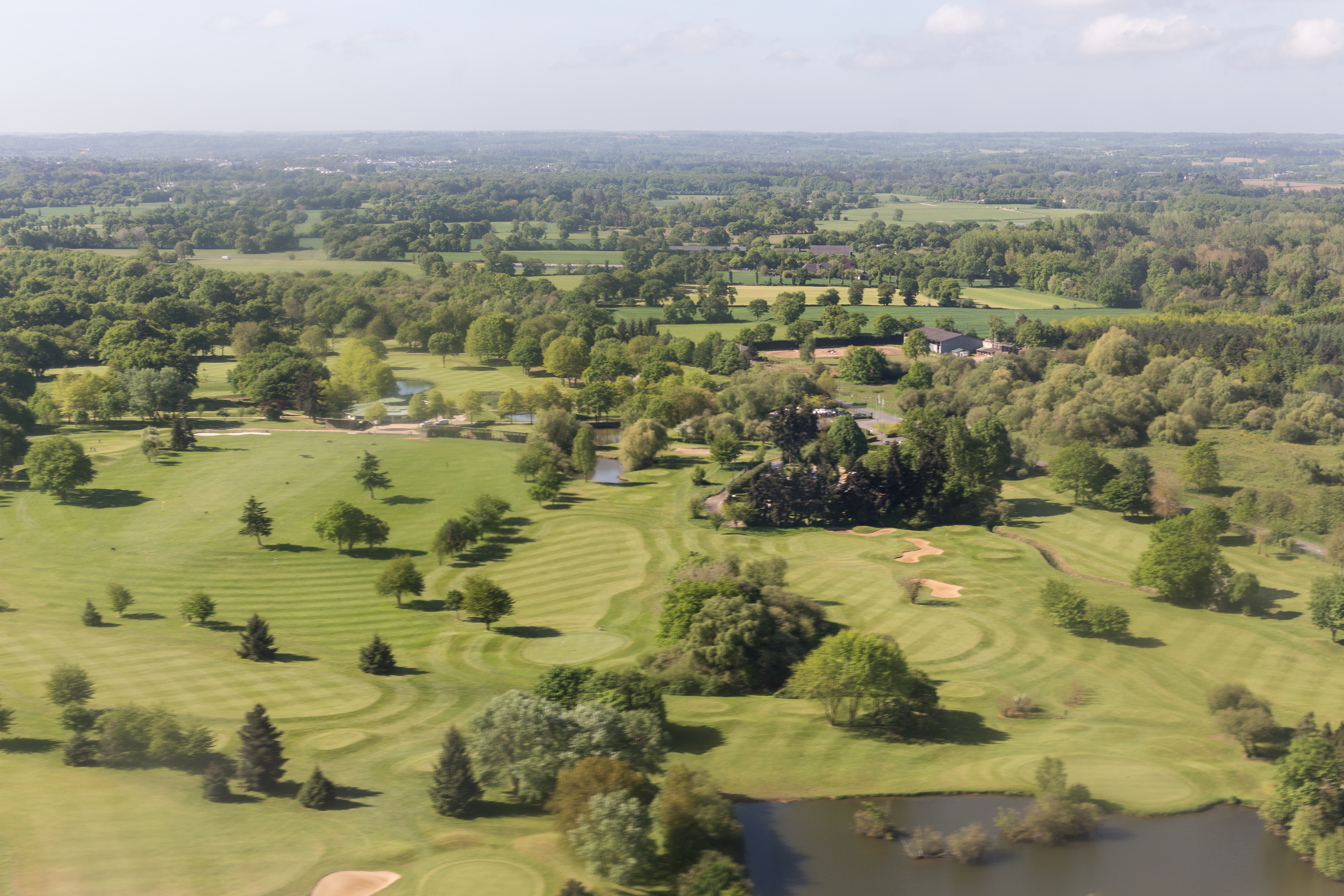
Golf near Rennes.

Aquarium de l'Océanopolis de Brest.

==== Heritage sites ====
A concentration of heritage sites distinguishes the region, which has the second highest number of listed monuments. There are more than 4,000 castles and manor houses, 1,077 megalithic sites and 3,000 religious sites. In all, more than 3,000 historic monuments are protected, and two of them – the Carnac stones and the Vauban tower – have been listed as UNESCO World Heritage Sites.

Heritage sites such as the walled town of Concarneau, Fort la Latte and the Valley of the Saints are among the most popular with visitors. The region also has a concentration of its own heritage, including parish enclosures in northern Finistère (Saint-Thégonnec, Pleyben...) and a network of Petites Cités de Caractère (Rochefort-en-Terre, Locronan...).

The region's museums focus on different cultural aspects (regional history: Compagnie des Indes museum, Breton Resistance museum, etc.; fine arts: Pont-Aven museum, Rennes fine arts museum, etc.; ethnography: salt marsh museum, Monts d'Arrée eco-museum, etc.). Around 36 of these are part of the Musée de France network, with over 1.2 million admissions in 2017.

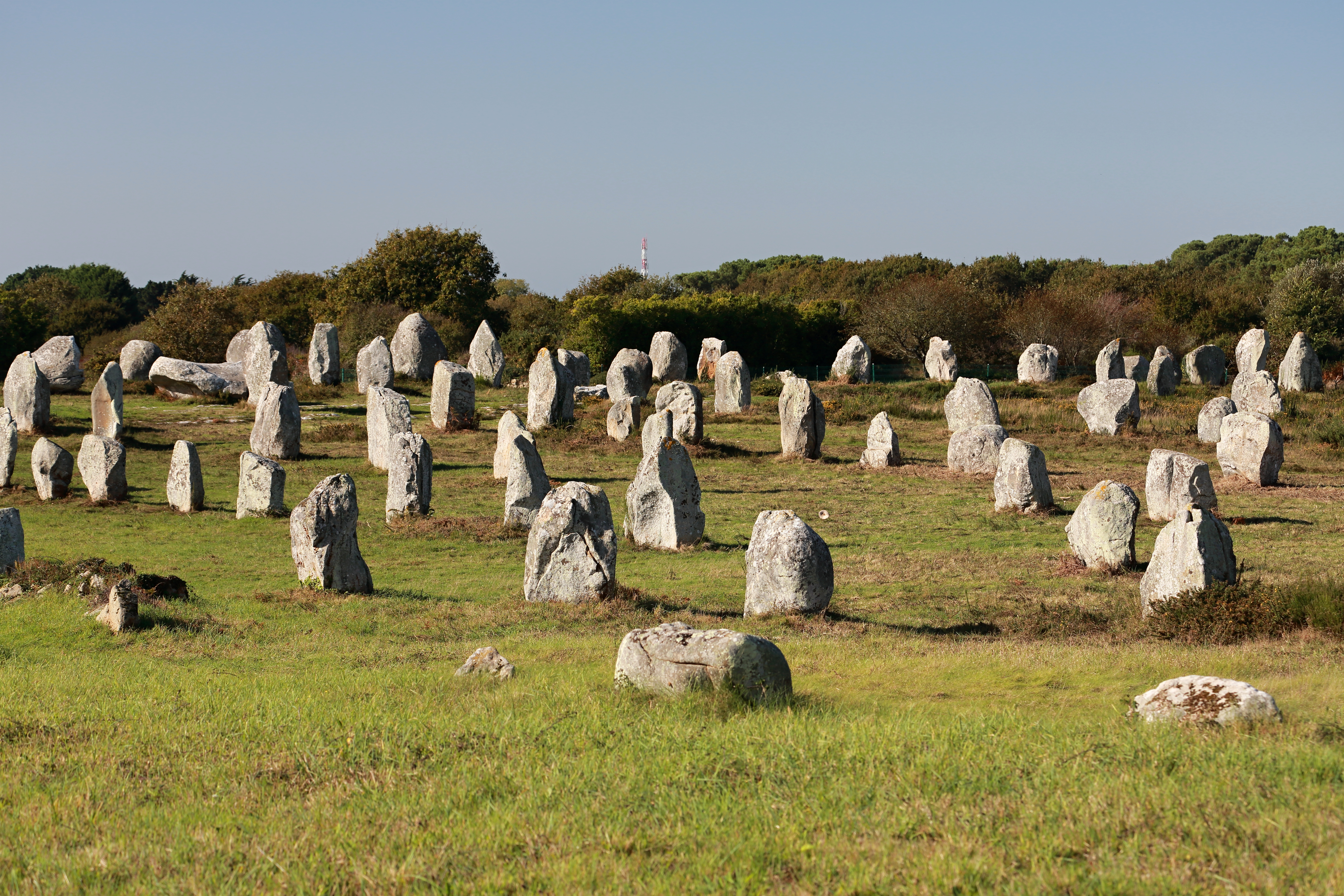
Carnac stones.

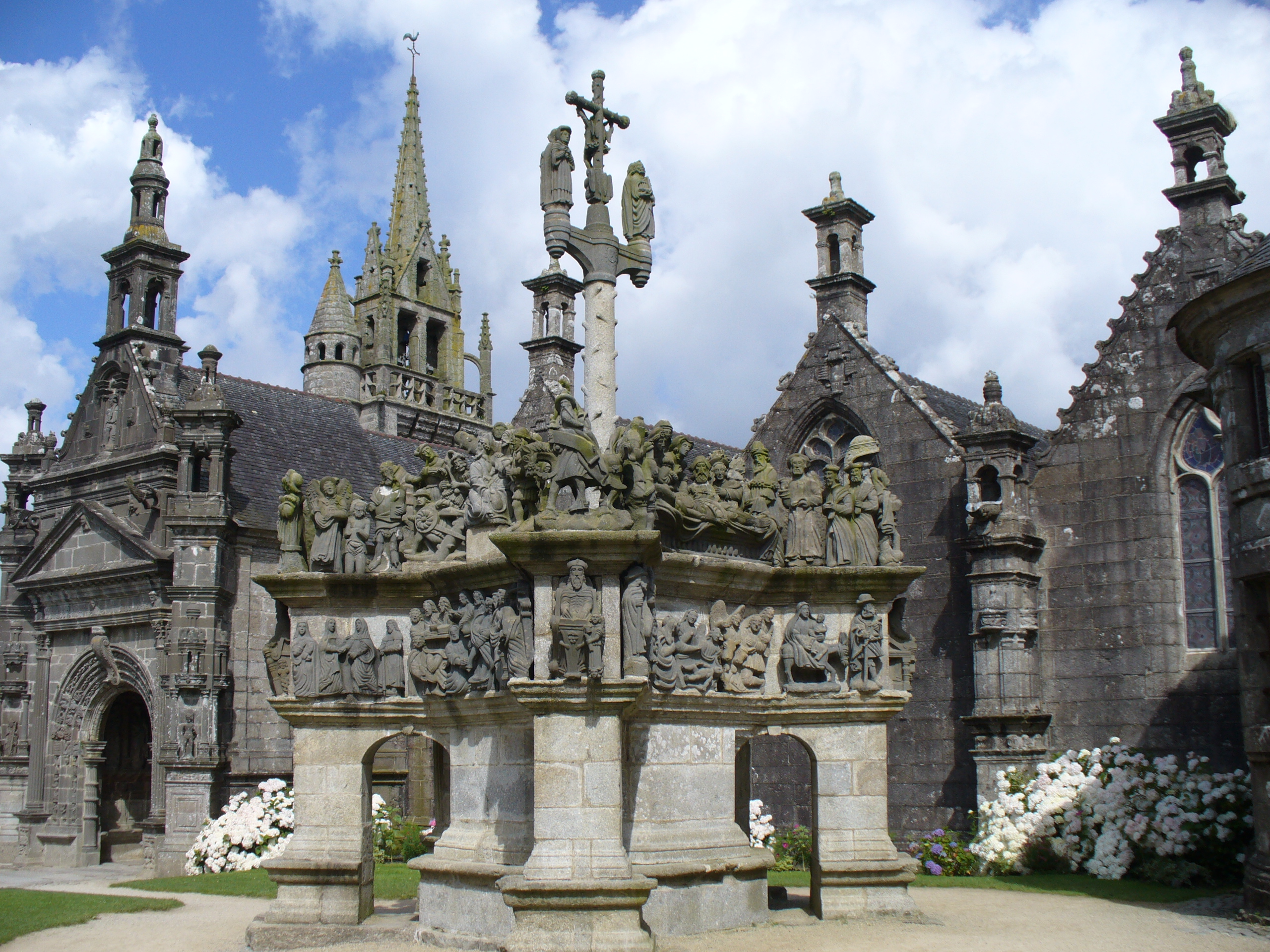
Guimiliau Parish close

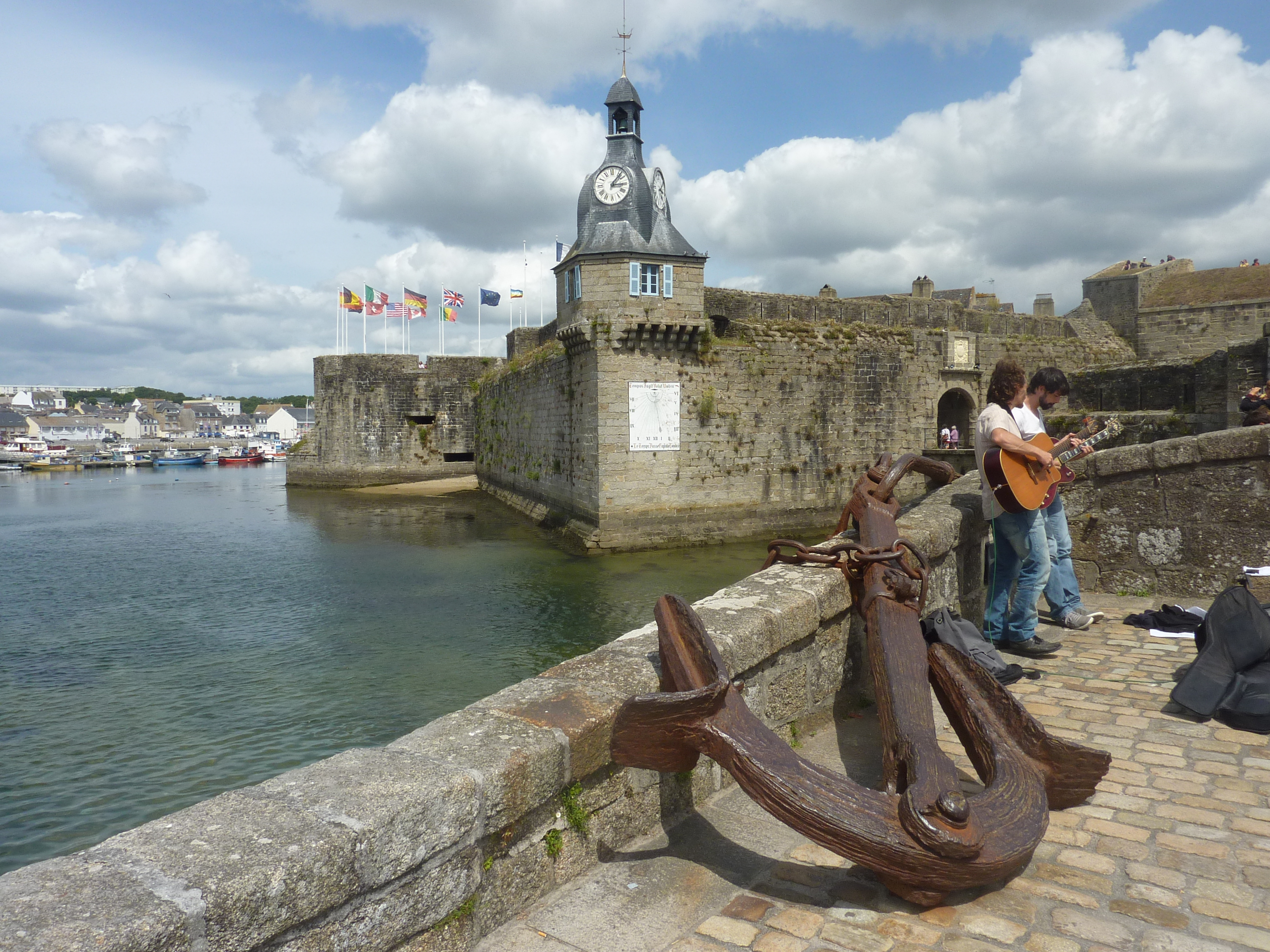
Walled town of Concarneau.

==== Natural sites ====
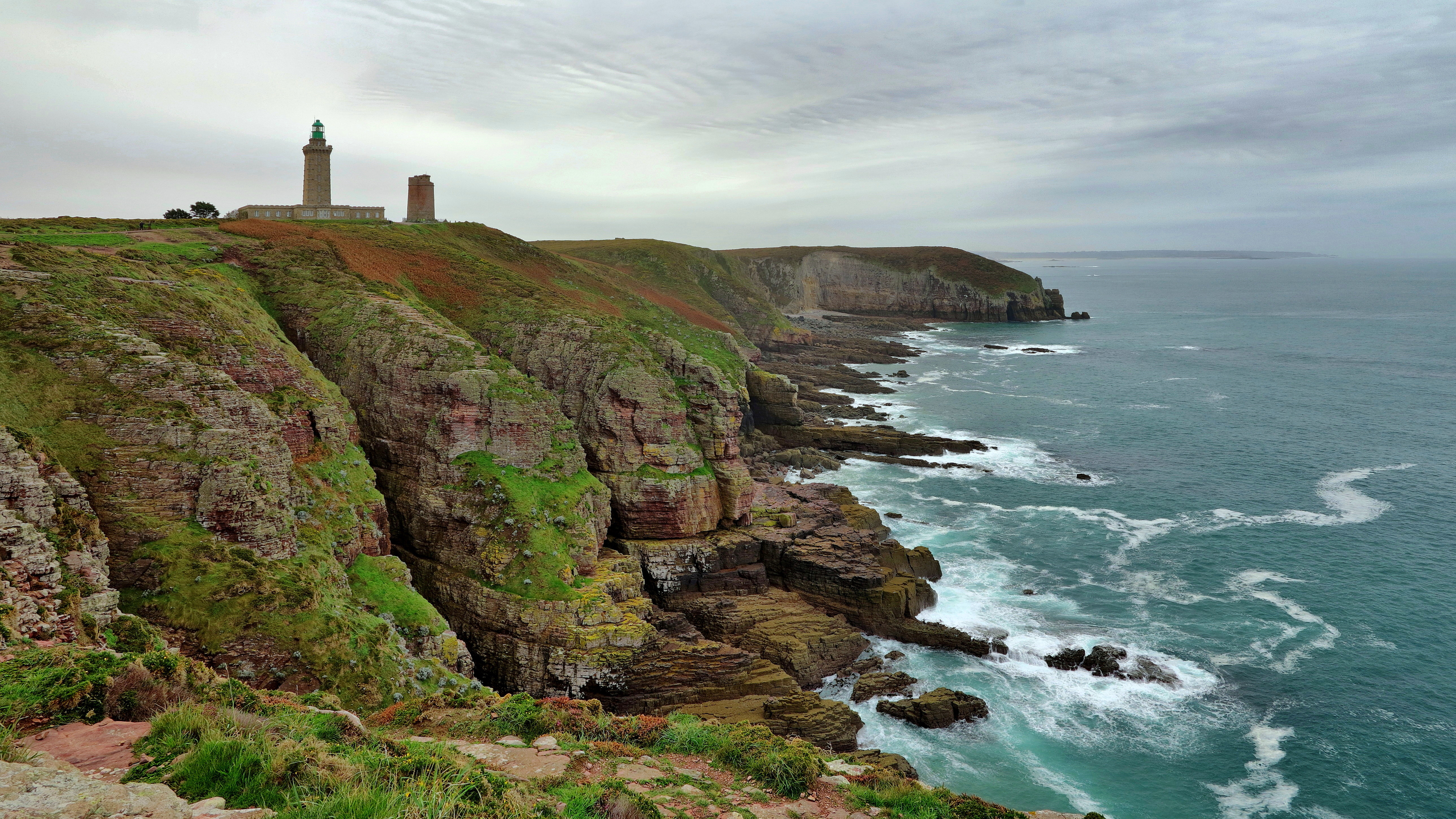
Cap Fréhel.

Some natural sites attract large numbers of tourists. Capes such as Pointe du Grouin, Cap Fréhel and Pointe du Raz are the main sites visited in the region. As for the islands, Belle-Île-en-Mer, Bréhat, Île aux Moines, Groix and Sept-Îles are the most popular.

In all, the region has 41 land sites and 18 marine sites classified as Natura 2000, as well as 669 sites classified or registered as nature or landscape sites. In 2020, Brittany will have sixteen nature reserves: seven classified at the national level (RNN) and nine by the region (RNR), including France's oldest de facto reserve, the Sept-Îles National Nature Reserve. Two regional nature parks (PNR) are dedicated to promoting the region's natural and cultural heritage: the PNR d'Armorique, with 44 communes in Finistère, and the PNR du Golfe du Morbihan, with 33 communes. A third is planned between Ille-et-Vilaine and Côte-d'Armor.

=== Gastronomy ===
Breton gastronomy is one of the region's main tourist attractions, notably linked to its maritime character and the importance of agriculture in the region's history. However, this use by tourists is relatively recent. While gastronomes such as Curnonsky and Alain Bourguignon were already promoting the quality of Breton products at the beginning of the 20th century, this aspect was still absent from tourist guidebooks published between the wars. It wasn't until the 1950s, thanks to the boom in tourism in the region, that local produce found its way onto tourist tables. Seafood (scallops, mussels, oysters, langoustines, crabs, various fish), products of the land (strawberries from Plougastel, artichokes, cauliflower, onions from Roscoff, carrots), and local preparations (charcuterie such as andouille from Guémené, desserts such as crêpes, cider, chouchen) became closely associated with the region by tourists. From the 1960s onwards, this typicality of local products was exploited for tourism purposes.

Gastronomic practices linked to tourism can take many forms. Some areas have developed tourist routes, such as the cider route in Cornouaille, the strawberry route in Plougastel and the sardine route in Douarnenez. Agri-food companies linked to the region, such as Hénaff in Pouldreuzic, can develop tourist activities linking production and the region. The catering industry can build on the "terroir" aspect of its dishes, highlighting local producers and relying on short supplier circuits. Local specialities such as the galette-saucisse can be highlighted as examples of street food to try, as can certain markets such as the Marché des Lices in Rennes. In all, the region has over 6,000 traditional restaurants, 221 maîtres restaurateurs, and 42 Michelin-starred restaurants.

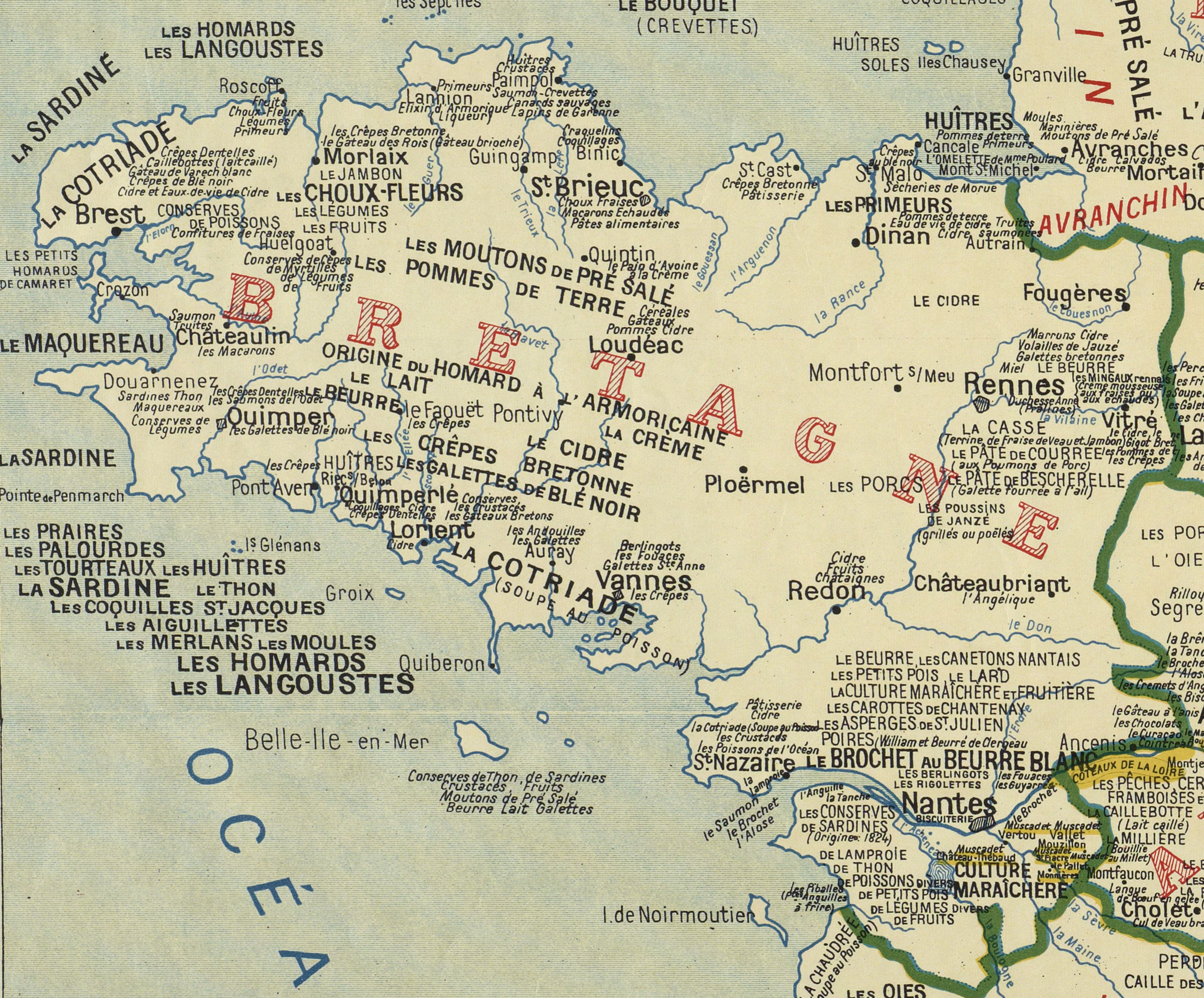
Alain Bourguignon's Breton gastronomic map.

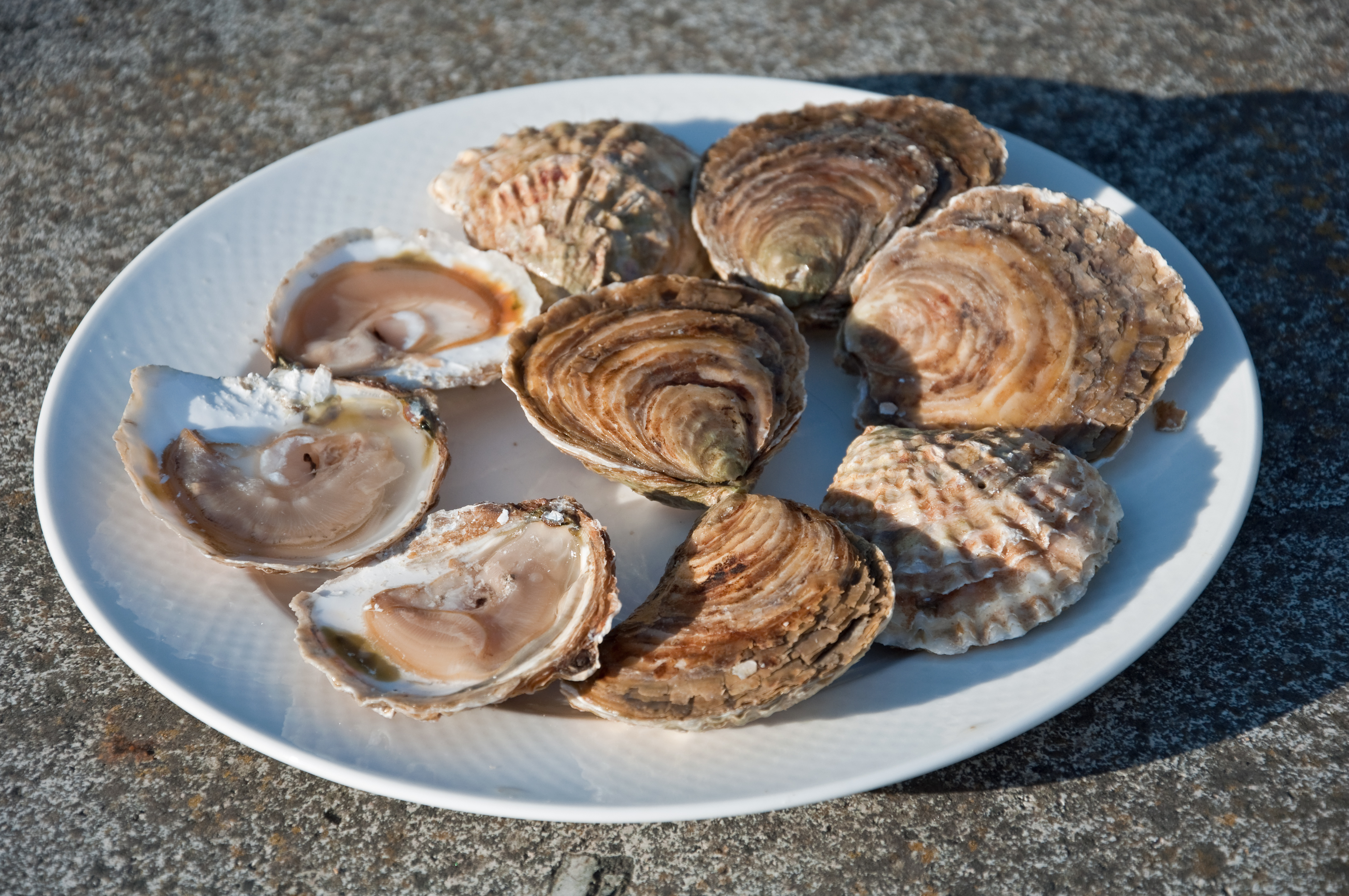
Flat oysters from Cancale.

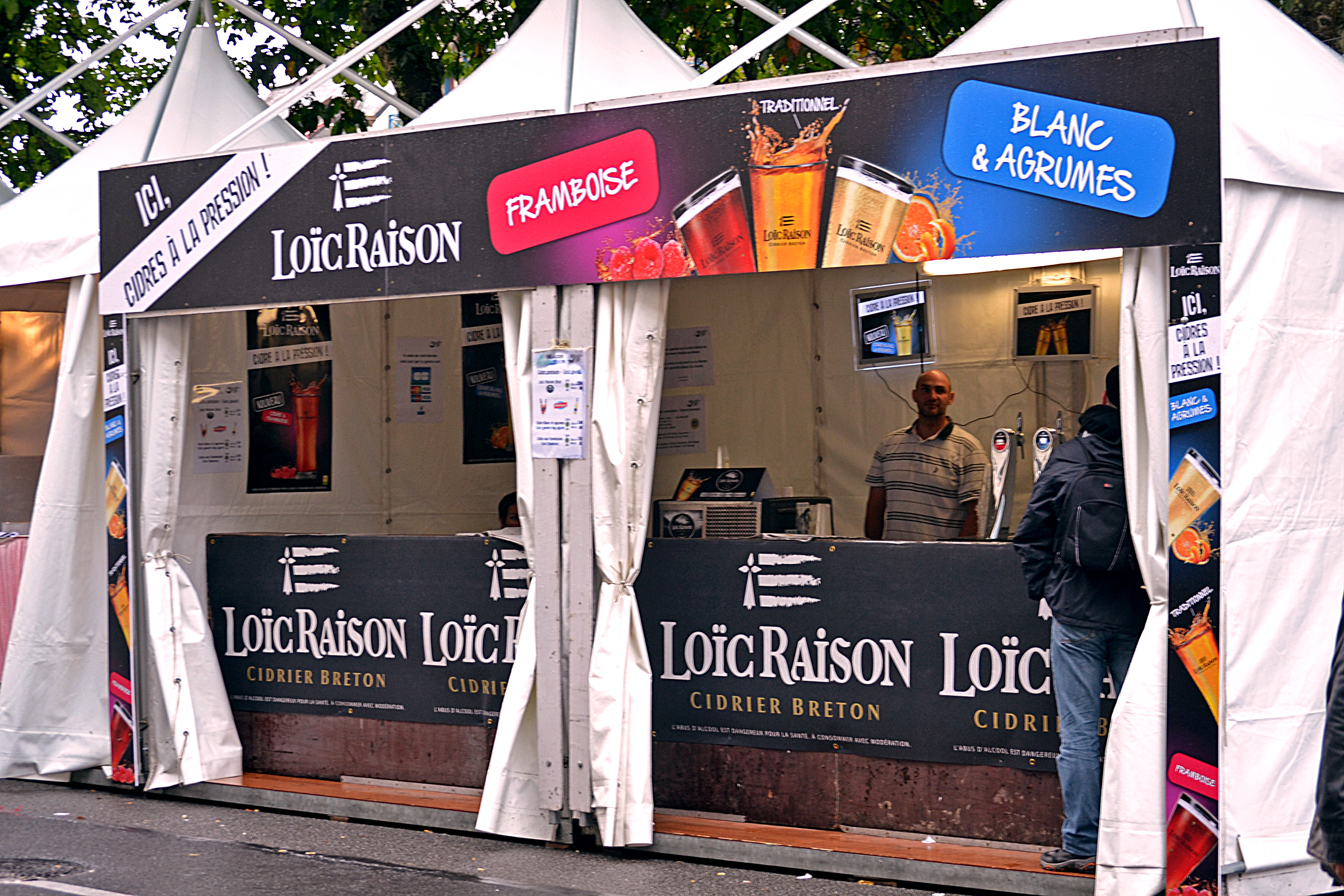
Cider sales at the Cornouaille Festival.

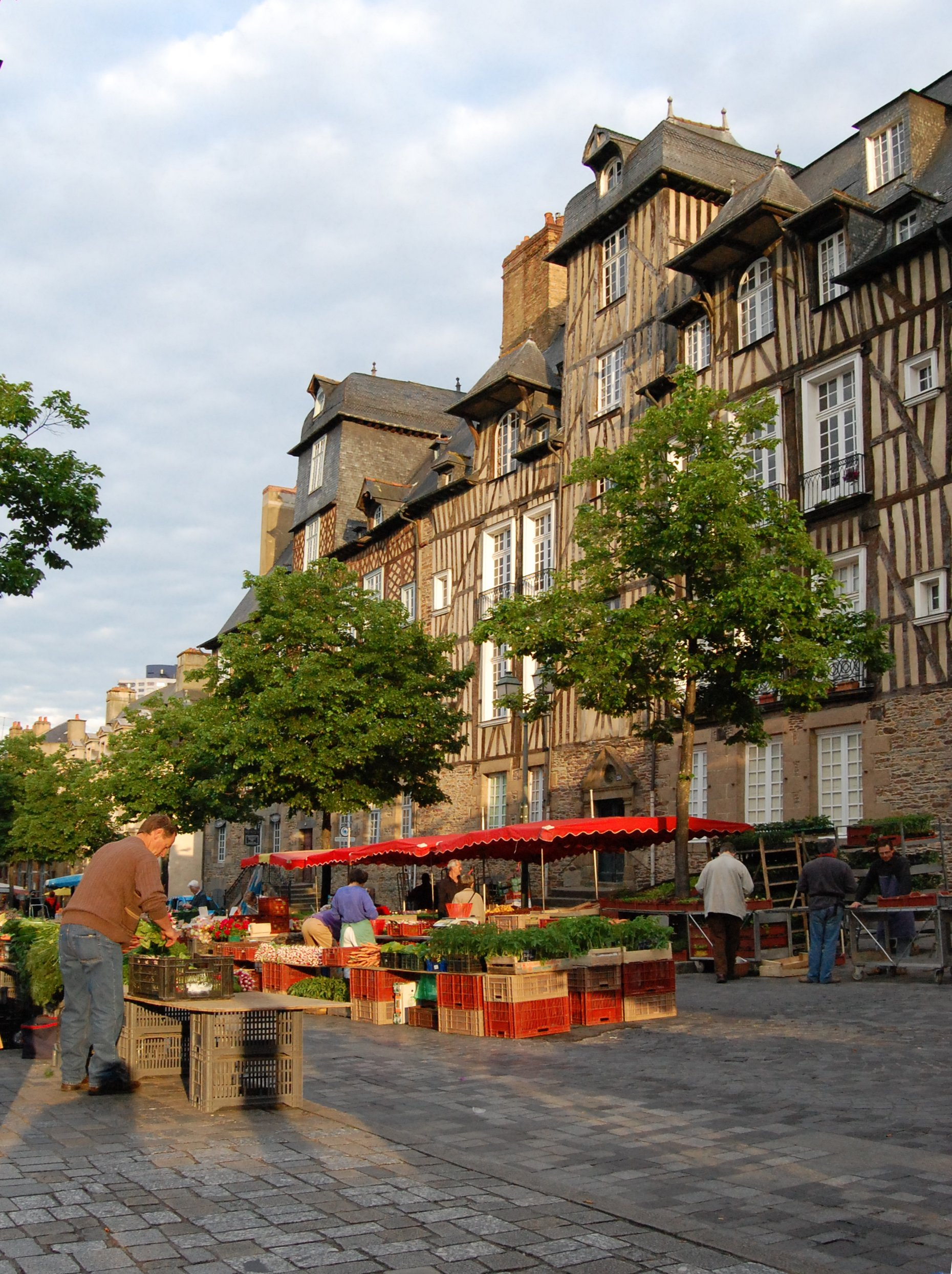
Marché des Lices in Rennes.

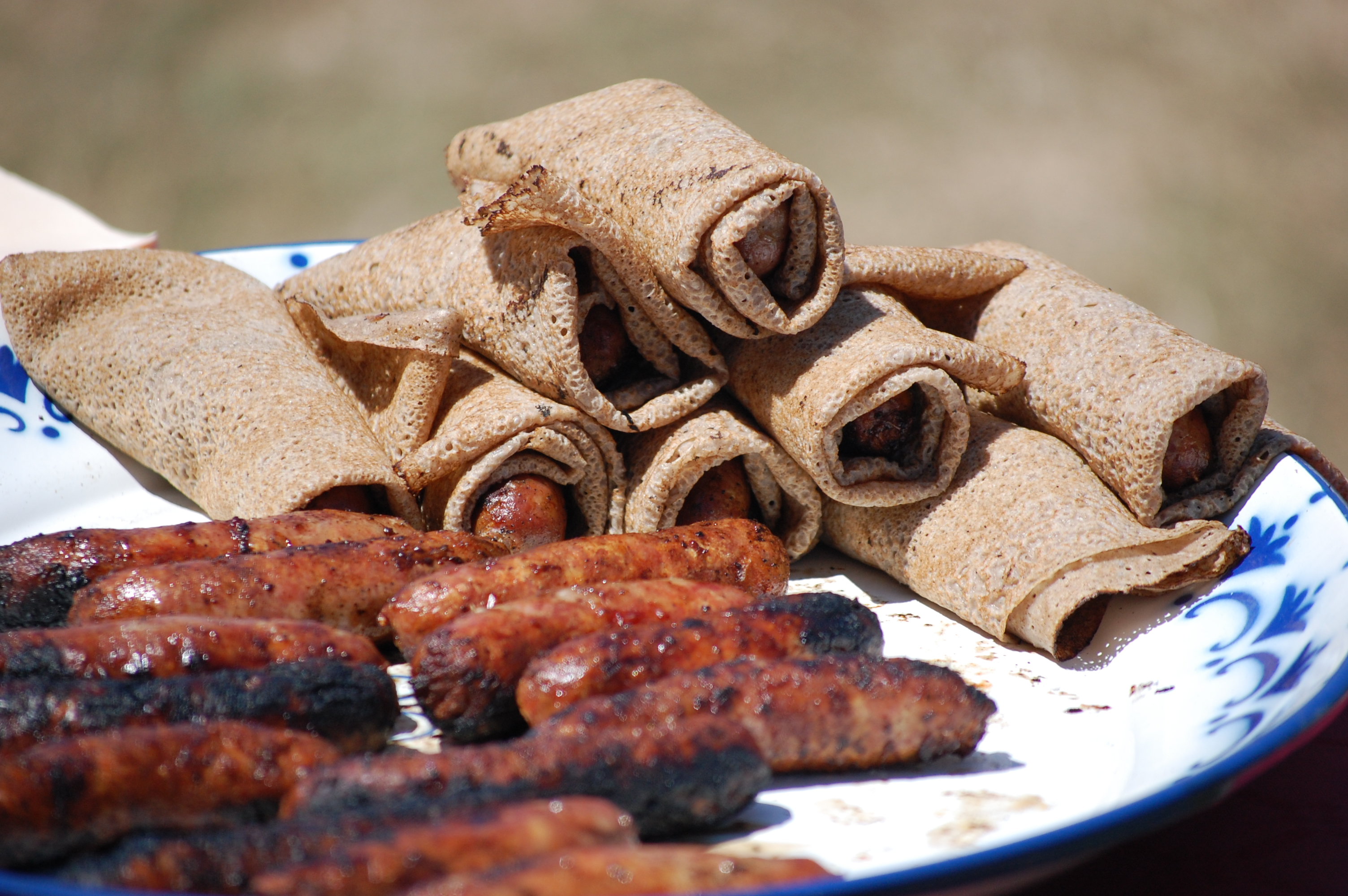
Galette-saucisse, an example of local street food.

== Bibliography ==
=== General works on Brittany ===
- Cleach, Olivier (2019). Panorama de la Bretagne : édition 2020 (in French). Le Télégramme.
- Cornette, Joël (2008). Histoire de la Bretagne et des Bretons, t. 2 : Des Lumières au xxie siècle (in French). Le Seuil. ISBN 978-2-7578-0996-9.
- Denis, Michel; Monnier, Jean-Jacques; Le Coadic, Ronan; Gourlay, Patrick; Geslin, Claude (2010). Histoire d'un siècle, Bretagne 1901-2000 : L'émancipation d'un monde (in French). Skol Vreizh. ISBN 978-2-915623-62-8.
- Monnier, Jean-Jacques; Cassard, Jean-Christophe (2012). Toute l'Histoire de Bretagne : Des origines à nos jours (in French). Skol Vreizh. p. 864. ISBN 978-2-915623-79-6.

=== Institutional publications ===
- Grebot, Benjamin; Laﬂeur, Kim; Leblanche, Philippe; Queffurus, Laurent; Ruiz, Henri-Noël; Boissonnot, Christine; Cherel, Guillaume; Corre, Vincent; Le Hir, Nadine (2017). Destination(s) Bretagne : les villes, moteurs d'une nouvelle attractivité touristique (in French). Fédération des agences d'urbanisme et de développement de Bretagne.
- Conseil régional de Bretagne (2012). Une nouvelle stratégie touristique régionale (in French).

=== Academic publications on tourism in Brittany ===
- Clairay, Philippe; Vincent, Johan (2008). Le développement balnéaire breton : une histoire originale (in French). Vol. 115. Annales de Bretagne et des Pays de l’Ouest. pp. 201–233. doi:10.4000/abpo.230.
- Drouin, Martin (2005). De la fréquentation du "petit patrimoine" : Chapelles et tourisme en Bretagne (in French). Vol. 24. Téoros. pp. 58–60.
- Gaugue, Anne (2000). Espaces touristiques et territoires identitaires en Bretagne (in French). Vol. 187. Norois. pp. 303–316. doi:10.3406/noroi.2000.7027.
- Le Disez, Jean-Yves (2002). Étrange Bretagne : Récits de voyageurs britanniques en Bretagne (in French). Presses universitaires de Rennes. ISBN 978-2-86847-646-3.
- Mazin, Fabrice (2011). "Le Comité d'études et de liaison des intérêts bretons (CÉLIB) face à la question du tourisme. Entre développement régional et défense du patrimoine breton". Initiateurs et entrepreneurs culturels du tourisme (1850-1950) (in French). Presses universitaires de Rennes. ISBN 978-2-7535-1363-1.
- Prigent, Lionel (2016). Tourisme durable, attractivité touristique et gastronomie : le cas de la Bretagne (in French). Vol. 3. Management & Avenir.
- Richard, Nathalie; Pallier, Yveline (1996). Cent ans de tourisme en Bretagne, 1840–1940 (in French). Apogée. ISBN 978-2-909275-76-5.
- Vincent, Johan (2007). L'intrusion balnéaire : Les populations littorales bretonnes et vendéennes face au tourisme (1800-1945) (in French). Presses universitaires de Rennes. ISBN 978-2-7535-0499-8.
- Vincent, Johan (2012). Les paradis de papier : les sites balnéaires bretons magnifiés par les guides (1860-1939) (in French). Vol. 119. Annales de Bretagne et des Pays de l'Ouest. pp. 99–112. doi:10.4000/abpo.2496.
