= Caffarelli =

Caffarelli is a given name. Notable people with the given name include:

- Caffarelli (castrato), stage name of the castrato Gaetano Majorano (1710–1783)
- Carmela Cafarelli (1889–1979) was proprietor of Cleveland Ohio's Cafarelli Opera Company
- Luis Caffarelli (born 1948), Argentine mathematician
- A family of French church and military leaders, all of them brothers:
- Louis-Marie-Joseph Maximilian Caffarelli du Falga (1756–1799), general
- Charles Ambroise de Caffarelli du Falga (1758–1826), canon and prefect
- Louis Marie Joseph Caffarelli (1760–1845), the first préfet maritime de Brest
- Jean-Baptiste de Caffarelli du Falga (1763–1815), bishop of Saint-Brieuc
- Marie-François Auguste de Caffarelli du Falga (1766–1849), general

.
