= Château de Brest =

Castle in Brest, Finistère, France

Coordinates: 48.381256°N 4.494708°W

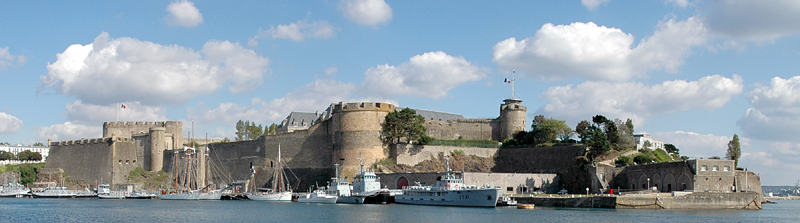
Panorama of the Château de Brest

The Château de Brest (Breton: Kastell Brest, pronounced [ˈkastɛl bʀest]) or Castle of Brest is a castle in Brest, Finistère, Brittany, France. The oldest monument in the town, it is located at the mouth of the river Penfeld at the heart of the roadstead of Brest, one of the largest roadsteads in the world. From the Roman castellum to Vauban's citadel, the site has over 1700 years of history, holding right up to the present day its original role as a military fortress and a strategic location of the highest importance. It is thus the oldest castle in the world still in use, and was classified as a monument historique on 21 March 1923.

The structure's heterogeneous architecture has been the result of continual adaptations to developments in siege warfare and armament on land and sea. The château stands on the opposite bank to the Tour Tanguy combining to defend the entrance to the Penfeld.

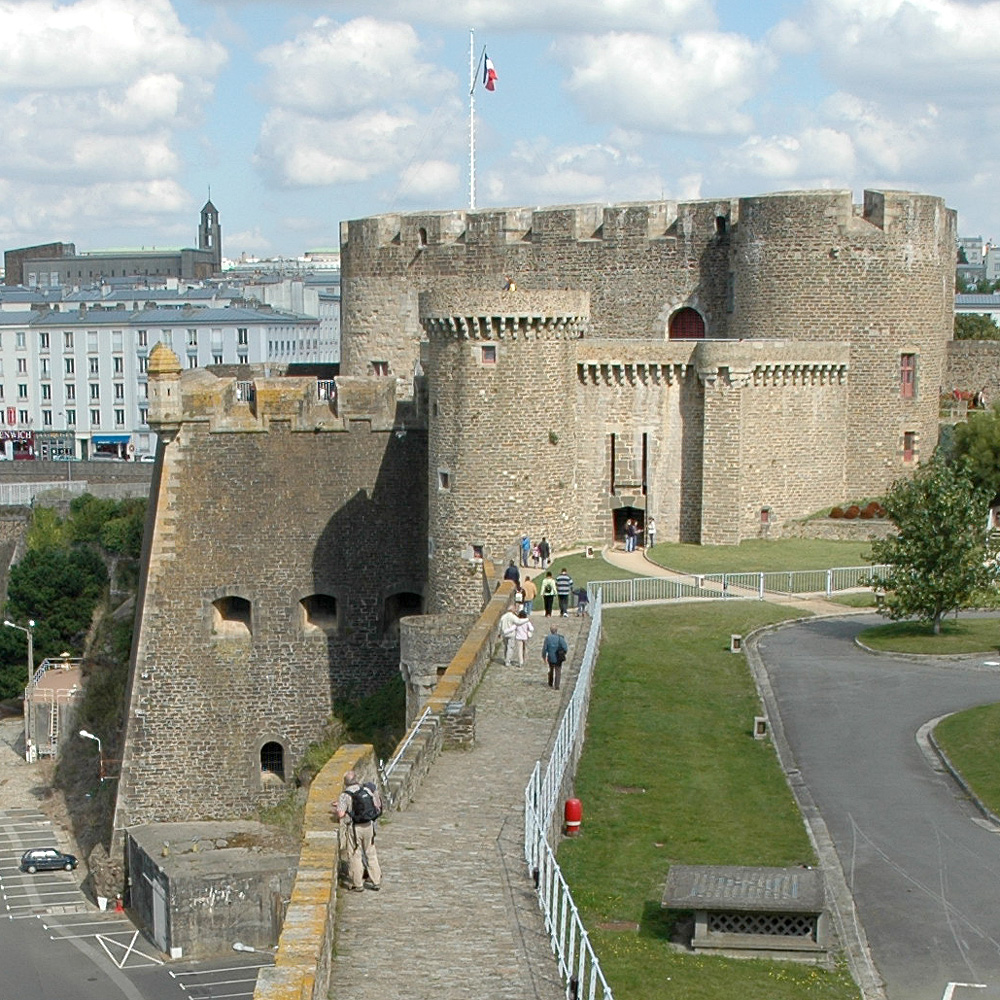
The keep of the château de Brest, seen from the tour de Brest

== An ideal geographic location ==
Brest - Chart of the Coasts and Roads of Brest with its Batteries and Forts

The Roadstead of Brest, well-protected by a narrow "goulet" but sufficiently large to allow ships to turn or move, forms a natural harbour. Its dimensions make it a small inland sea, capable of receiving the largest fleets. It is so vast that it offers a protected haven for ships.

This natural haven is fed from the north by the Penfeld River, which flows down from the plateaus of Léon. Its lower course winds through the landscape, its high, sheltered banks providing protection from strong winds. The broad and sheltered waters are deep enough to accommodate even large-tonnage vessels safely.

The cape separating the roadstead from the bay forms a naturally fortified site: three of its four sides are protected by the surrounding terrain, while only the fourth requires additional fortification, and even there, the position is relatively easy to defend. This exceptional combination of natural protection and strategic access gives the castle immense military and strategic significance.

The castle was thus built on a rocky outcrop which the river has carved out of the cliff at its mouth in the estuary. Since the place overlooks and dominates the sea, it controls access to the Penfeld and the lower reaches of the Élorn towards Landerneau, all whilst overlooking a major part of the roadstead and its entrance: the Goulet de Brest.

It is the only natural port the king has on the ocean sea. It is so advantageously disposed in all ways that if its location and form had been chosen by his Majesty himself it could not have been wished otherwise.

== History ==
=== Origins ===
The site was inhabited during the Lower Palaeolithic (300,000 BC) and in the Neolithic agricultural activity occurred on the site. Other coastal populations are known in the 6th and 4th centuries BC and the rocky spur was occupied until the end of the Iron Age. Its remarkable position allows a hypothesis that the site held a prehistoric fortification, but the first fort of which evidence remains is from the Roman era.

Around 500 BC, a tribe of merchants and sailors in leather barks known as the Osismii peopled the region. To them are to be attributed the gold coinage discovered around Brest, as well as a road predating the Roman presence in the area. The tribe's territory (roughly equivalent to today's Finistère) was bordered to the south by the territory of the Veneti and to the east by that of the Curiosolites, with its capital at Vorgium (Carhaix). This end of the world (Finis terrae) only saw Roman occupation very late in the Roman period.

=== Roman era ===
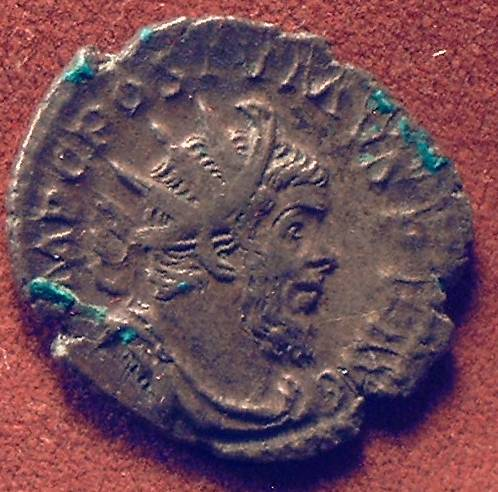
Coin with the image of Postumus

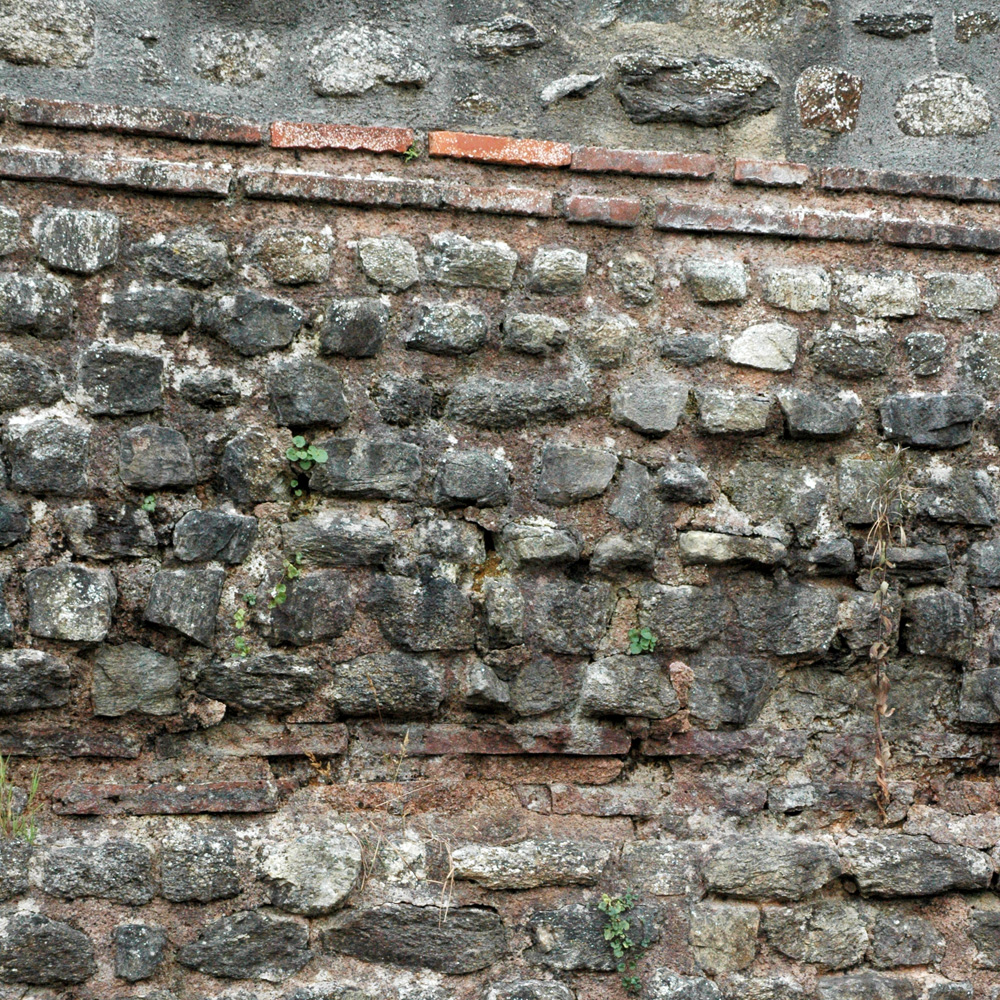
Opus mixtum

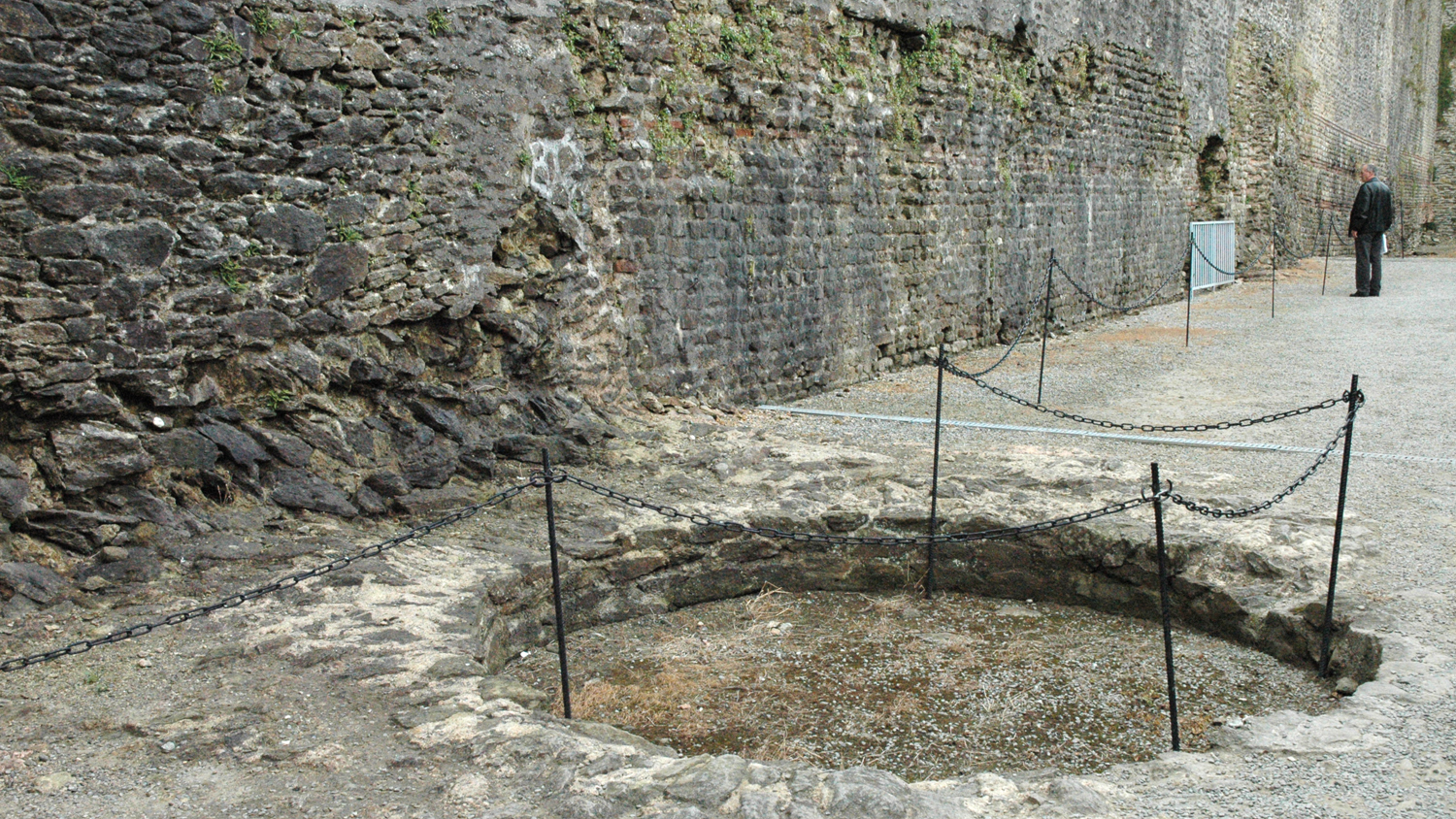
Imprint of a Roman tower

From Roman coinage found on the site, it appears that the Romans were present there at least by the reign of the emperor Septimius Severus (193–211). The Roman province of Armorica thus had to face Saxon raids. To face the threat of invasion and the disintegration of the Roman empire, it became necessary to create forts at Brest and several other sites along these coasts.

The Romans erected a defensive work at the end of the 3rd century. This camp or castellum housed 1000 men of a troop, headed by a prefect, as well as a fleet designed to intercept pirate ships. Only one of its walls now survives - these foundations were encased in the ramparts of the present castle, extending for 120-140m in length, on an average height of 3-4m.

These begin from the base of the wall. In large part interred under the false-wall of the castle or under the carpark, it remains visible at 2-3m high. Their external appearance is characteristically Roman, with brick and stone alternating in "opus mixtum", sometimes arranged in "fish-bone" pattern. This 4m thick fortified wall, with 10 cylindrical towers, defends the point and forms a bar across the spur.The absence of Roman remains inside the castle suggests it was a purely military work and not also a civil oppidum. The section of the razed towers at ground level remains visible in the false wall.

It seems that the Romans did not entirely complete the fortified wall since their presence here was short-lived. At this era, it is possible that the sea coast was simply defended by a ditch and palisade. 1832 saw the discovery of the foundations of a round tower, Roman in appearance, near what is now the tour de Brest.

The wall was certainly completed as a curtain wall on 3 sides, in a regular trapezoid, with 12 turrets on each side. Another Gallo-Roman remain survives - a 1.4m wide postern, demolished in the Middle Ages (its stones and bricks survive in the tour Madeleine).

Ancient Brest was probably the site known to the Romans as Gesoscribate at the termination point of one of the Armorican roads.

=== The counts of Léon ===
From the Romans' departure (410–420) until the 11th century, little is known as to the history of the castellum at Brest. It remained a stronghold and thus belonged to the counts of Léon, whilst a town developed at the foot of the Roman enclosure. In 537, count Elven held court at Brest. His daughter, Azenor, is the subject of a legend and she has thus given her name to one of the castle's towers.

Around 1064 or 1065, duke Conan II (or possibly Léon Morvan II, one of the vicomtes de Léon) ordered the renovation of the castle, cutting a moat around it and building a chapel within the enclosure, dedicated to "Notre Dame de Pitié" (destroyed in 1819), and a keep (perhaps in the northern corner of the fortifications).

In 1240, the castle passed to the duke of Brittany, John I, and became an essential part of the duchy's defence system. Hervé IV left the place, HQ of the counts of Léon, to avoid a confrontation and in return for 100 livres of rent. The loss of the castle and attempts to retake it sounded the death knell of the county of Léon.

The castle remained unbeaten by the Normans. During this period was built the tour César, possibly on the ruins of a Gallo-Roman tower. It blocked all access to the rocky outcrop. The tour Azenor and the curtain wall onto which it is built also date to this time.

=== The dukes of Brittany ===
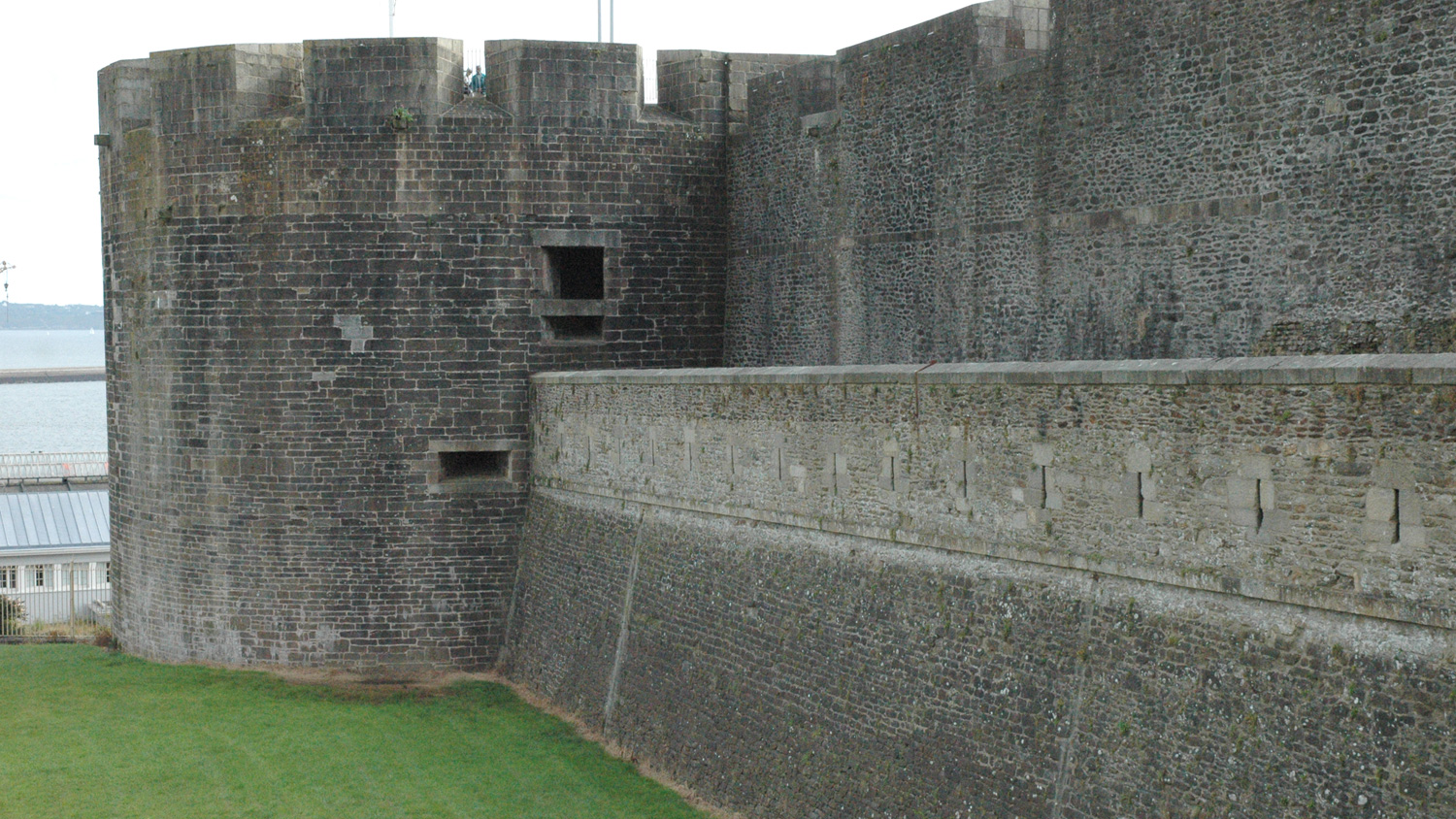
The fausse-braie

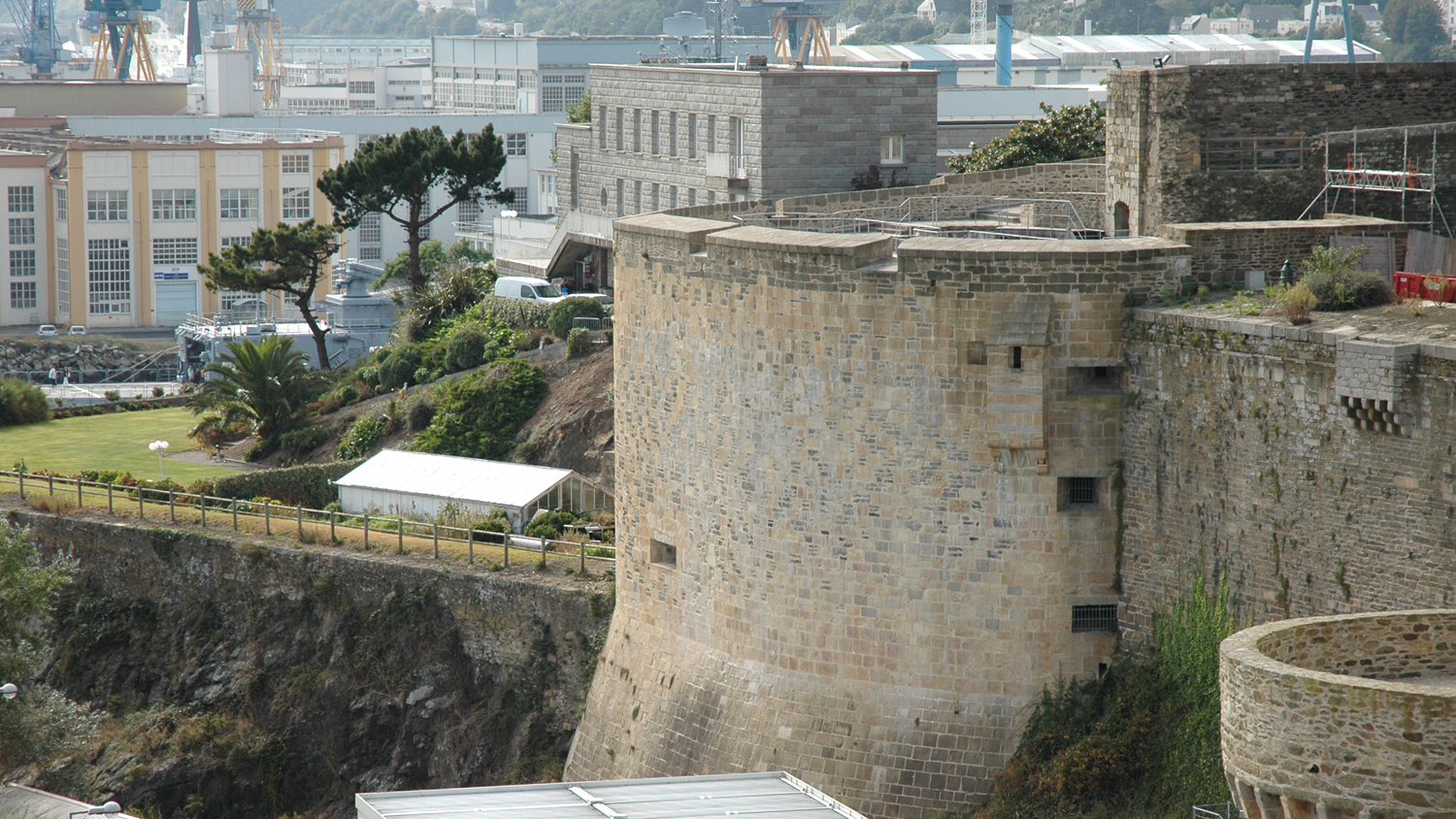
Tour Madeleine

The 'burg' expanded and left the castle. One of the two earliest burgs was situated beside Recouvrance (right bank) at the foot of what is now called the Tour Tanguy, and the other, larger and more enclosed one in front of the castle (left bank).

In return for services rendered, Philip IV of France made John II a peer, but his son John III's death led to a 22-year war of succession in the dukedom. In 1341, John, count of Montfort, half-brother of John III, fought Charles de Blois (husband of Jeanne de Penthièvre) for the dukedom. It was vital for John to capture Brest's castle, to prevent it becoming a refuge for his enemies or a landing-point for his enemies' ally Edward III of England. To make certain his siege would be successful, he ensured he had a large numerical superiority and powerful siege engines to batter a breach in the walls, but even so the assault lasted several days. The castle's captain Garnier de Clisson was killed in a counter-attack when he was trapped outside the walls by the closed portcullis, and so the defenders surrendered on the condition that their lives would be spared. This was the last time the castle would be taken by force. John of Montfort restored the buildings he had damaged in the siege and added to the defences, putting in place a garrison under Tanguy du Chastel, who built Brest's first enclosure.

On 7 September, the court of peers decided in favour of Charles de Blois's right to the duchy, and at the end of the year John of Montfort was imprisoned in the Louvre. His wife Jeanne of Flanders returned to the castle to shelter within its walls and sent an emissary to Edward III to seek an alliance. Thus the English set up a base in the castle thanks to the political disorders of August 1342, giving them control of the maritime route used by their trading ships and military convoys from 1342 to 1397. William of Rohan, earl of Northampton, headed the base with the title of lieutenant-general of Brittany, and Edward rejoined them in Brest 2 months later to support the rights of Montfort.

The Treaty of Guérande of 12 April 1365 concluded that women could only lay claim to the duchy of Brittany should there be no legitimate male heirs to the House of Brittany. John of Montfort rendered homage to Charles V of France and so Edward III no longer had any reason to continue his military presence at the castle. However, the place was too important to give up and Montfort was still financially dependent on England. Thus Charles V let Montfort off participating in the war he then launched on Edward III, but Montfort played a double game and passed a treaty on 21 February 1372 to open his lands to English troops even though constable Du Guesclin and Clisson were marching from Brittany against him, and the Breton commune of Concarneau was captured.

In the spring, the Breton lords seized the duchy's principal lands, denouncing their overlord, siding with the French king, rallying around the viscount of Rohan and charging Du Guesclin with hunting down the English. Montfort fled Brest for England on 28 April 1373 and the constable won victory after victory, retaking Concarneau and finally ending up before the walls of Brest castle in August. Command of English forces in the east had been entrusted to Sir John Neville under the authority of lieutenant-general Robert Knowles, with Brest's garrison under the famous English captains Robert Kermoulés and Fenville. After three weeks of siege Du Guesclin concluded a 6-week truce to begin on 6 July. At the end of that period, Kermoulés promised to hand Brest castle over to the besiegers' if no other help reached its defenders by then and under the condition that the place could not be re-supplied. The constable left the siege under the command of Olivier de Clisson to rejoin the duke of Anjou at the siege of the Castle of Derval (château de Derval). Clisson used the truce period to build the fort du Conquet. On 2 August, the English fleet under Salisbury (who also took over command of the castle) disembarked supplies and reinforcements which definitively rendered the castle impregnable.

The Treaty of Bruges of 27 June 1375 marked an armistice between France and England, and officially handed Brest's castle over to John of Montfort, though the town remained under English protection and Montfort was forced to return to England that September. In 1378 the Duke of Montfort was declared Duke of Brittany under the name John IV. He pursued Jean de Blois, with Charles V of France taking his side. John IV thus sought help from England and passed a new treaty, handing the castle over to Richard II of England. The English disembarked reinforcements on 15 June and fought off an attack on the castle by French royal troops under the viscount of Rohan and including the lords of Laval, Léon, Clisson and Beaumanoir.

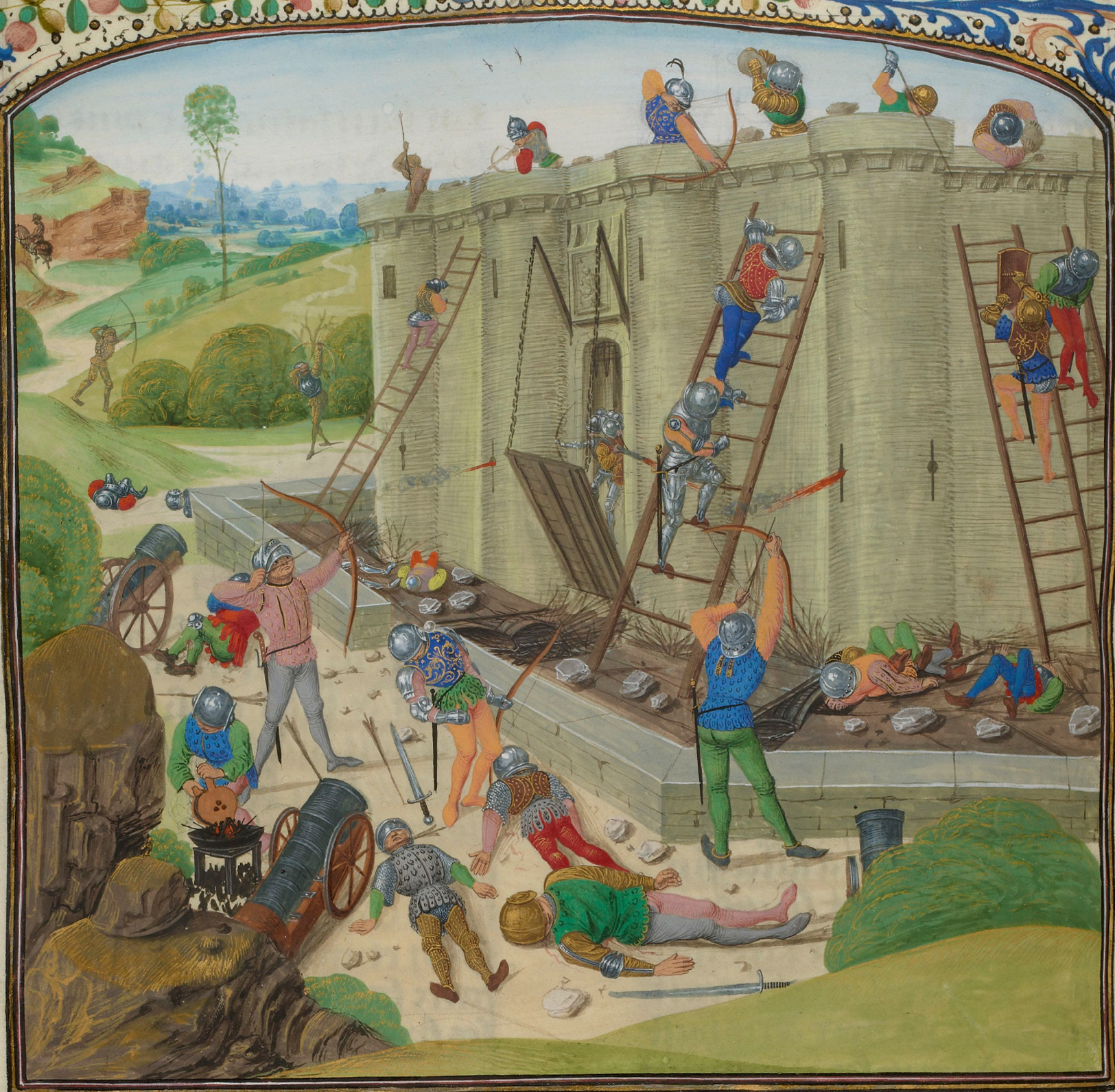
The 1386 siege of Brest

Returning to Brittany in 1379, John IV was welcomed by the Breton lords, who nevertheless criticized his pro-English stance. The Duke of Brittany demanded in vain the return of his lands and, irritated by his English parent's bad faith, he besieged Brest in 1386. Olivier De Clisson joined him on behalf of Charles VI of France. Knowing a direct assault on the castle was impossible, they built two forts (one in stone and the other in wood) to blockade it, but these were attacked and destroyed by the English. The attack was renewed the following year and, to prevent the castle being relieved by sea, a new wooden fort was built on boats placed in the middle of the goulet and at the entrance to the roadstead, raised on supporting stones on either bank. However, the English captain Henry Percy ruined the wooden fort and captured the two others.

The peace-treaty drawn up between France and England by Charles VI and Richard II meant that finally, on 28 March 1397, the Duke of Brittany was given back his lands. Jean Periou, lord of Mesguéant, became captain of Brest castle and Brittany's ships once again anchored below it. John IV said "he is not lord of Brittany who is not lord of Brest", but only occupied the castle for 2 years, dying on 2 November 1399.

The town developed very slowly, whilst the castle's perimeter expanded toward the west. The defended entrance was reinforced by a "châtelet", probably consisting of a wooden walkway and towers.

=== Ducal castle ===
The war re-erupted in 1403. John V was in his turn captured during the war between France and England. It was this era which truly gave birth to the town and port of Brest, to the detriment of the castle. The two banks were the objects of attack one after the other. In 1405 the castle's old captain, the earl of Huntingdon, burned the fleet of the count of Marche which was anchored in the Penfeld. John V marched on Brest at the head of 2,200 men, and he was joined by the Marshal of Rieux with 700 men at arms and Tanguy du Chatel with his peasants armed with pitchforks. Exacerbated by the English exactions, Huntingdon and his troop made them carve a piece. The Admiral of Brittany, John of Penhoat, left Roscoff and concluded the battle by destroying and capturing 40 ships and 2,000 men. The English were repulsed once more in 1453 by the garrison of Jean de Quelennec, vicomte du Faou and Admiral of Brittany, though Crozon was pillaged and burned in reprisal.

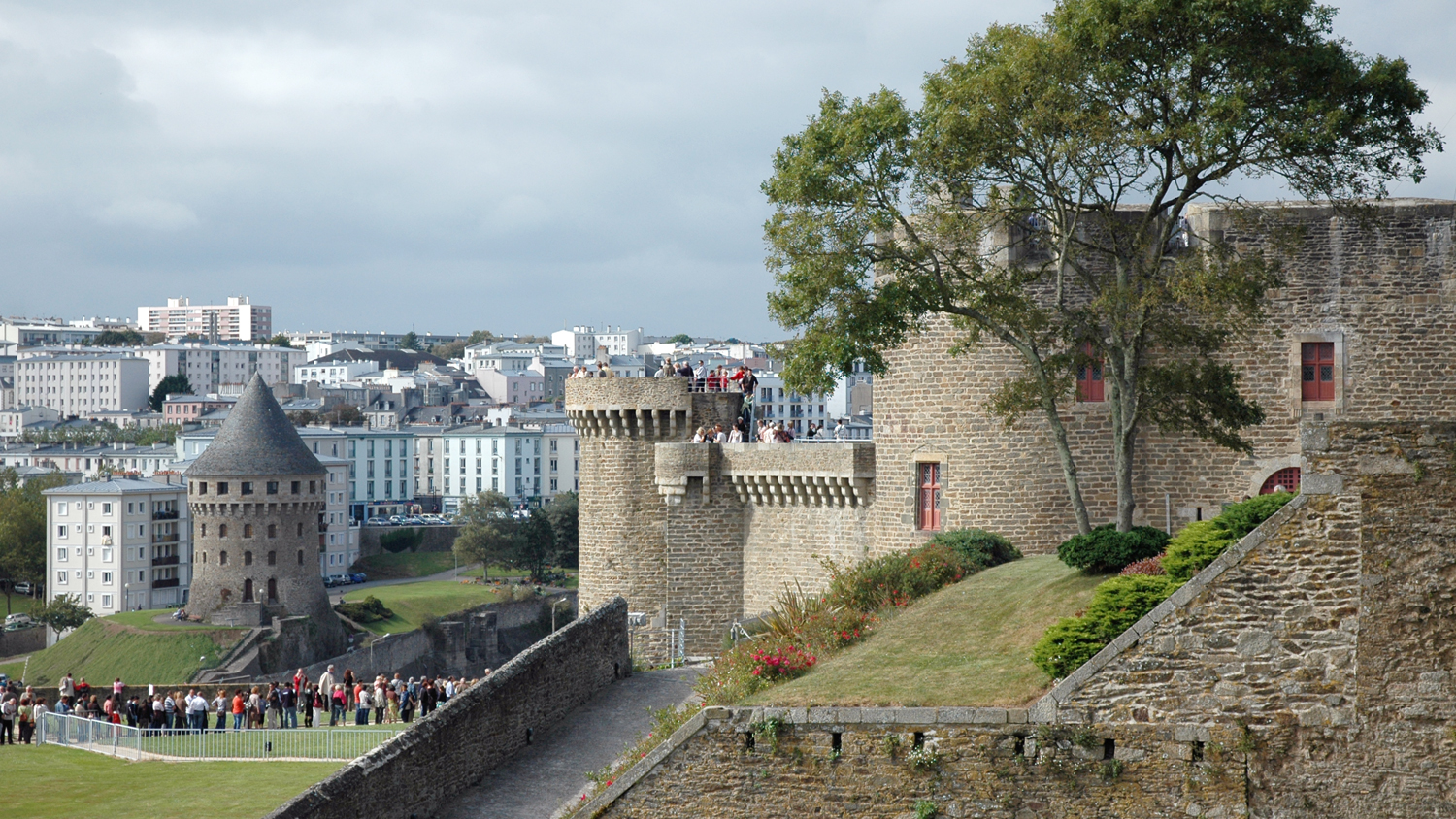
The keep

The 15th century was one of great works to adapt to new weapons and developments in defensive works. The castle's commanders (the comte de Languevez, 1405 - Éon Phelips, 1407 - Tanguy de Kermorvan, 1424) restored the castle and made it proof against siege engines. As in other fortified towns of the era, the duke built a fortified residence with the aim of making his stays in Brest more pleasant and more secure. He thus added the tour Duchesse Anne, the tour Nord and the tour Azenor (which became a cellar), a kitchen, rooms, lodgings and a chapel. The collection of towers was linked by curtain walls and formed a true "closed-town" lordly castle.

=== Duchess Anne of Brittany ===
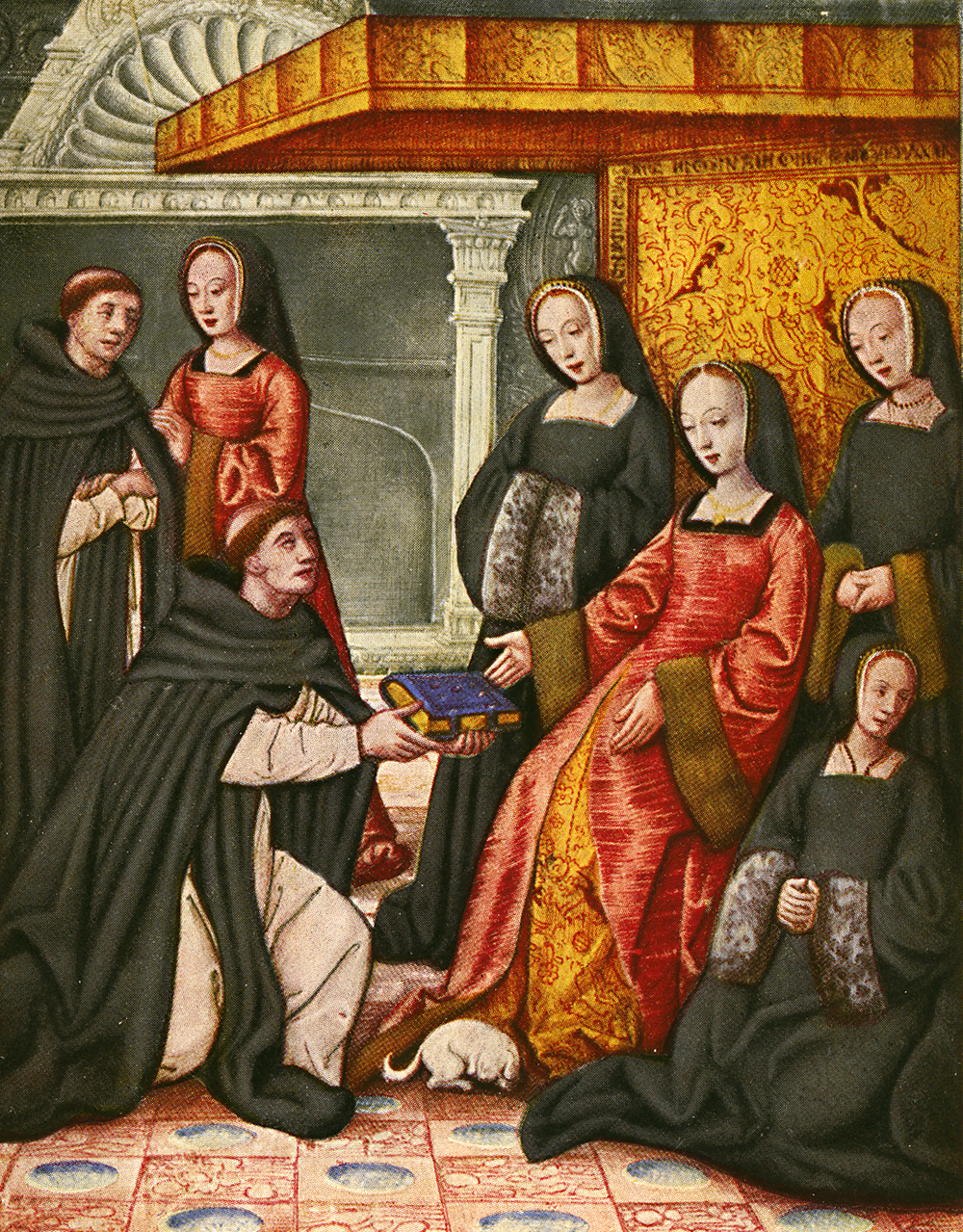
Anne of Brittany

Charles VIII concretely set his sights on the duchy of Brittany by the capture of Guingamp on 10 January 1489 by the viscount of Rohan and his troops. Concerned for Brest, duchess Anne directed the lord of Kérousy to reinforce it, but the castle opened its gates to the viscount of Rohan (doubtless aided by the treason of the castle's captain).

Like her predecessors, Anne initially allied herself with England. She returned Concarnaeu and Brest to Henry VII of England and the new Anglo-Breton alliance led to 22 vessels blockading Brest by sea and a strong army with high-quality artillery besieging it by land. However, the marshal of Rieux and admiral Bizien de Kérousy had to give way before the forces sent under Guillaume Carreau to defend Brest. A French squadron under Graville and reinforced by the Malouins of Jean de Porcon, put an Anglo-Breton fleet to flight and re-supplied the besieged castle. Harassed by the French, Rieux had no choice but to abandon it.

As a sign of his sovereignty, Charles VIII ordered that the French coat of arms be placed below the ravelin's gate. Anne of Brittany's marriage to Charles VIII on 6 December 1491, then to Louis XII on 17 January 1499, definitively put the castle under French royal control.

=== Anne of Brittany, Queen of France ===
In April 1505, the French king was gravely ill and Anne, his queen, decided to make a pilgrimage in the month of August to ask for his recovery. Her procession left Blois for Brittany. Her squire Gilles of Texue accompanied her, as did princes and lords of France and Breton barons and gentlemen. Anne began on the Tro Breizh, a pious pilgrimage for Bretons around Brittany, visiting seven cathedrals dedicated to their founding saints and inspecting her domains and fortifications as she passed from town to town and castle to castle - Nantes, Vannes, Hennebont, Quimper, Locronan. Jean d'Auton wrote in his chronicles of Louis XII that:

She was so honourably received that this was a marvellous triumphal procession, following the sea-coast, as far as Notre-Dame-du-Folgoët, and is to be held a miraculous thing in that so great a multitude of men, women and little children came to see their lady and mistress by fields, roads and lanes.

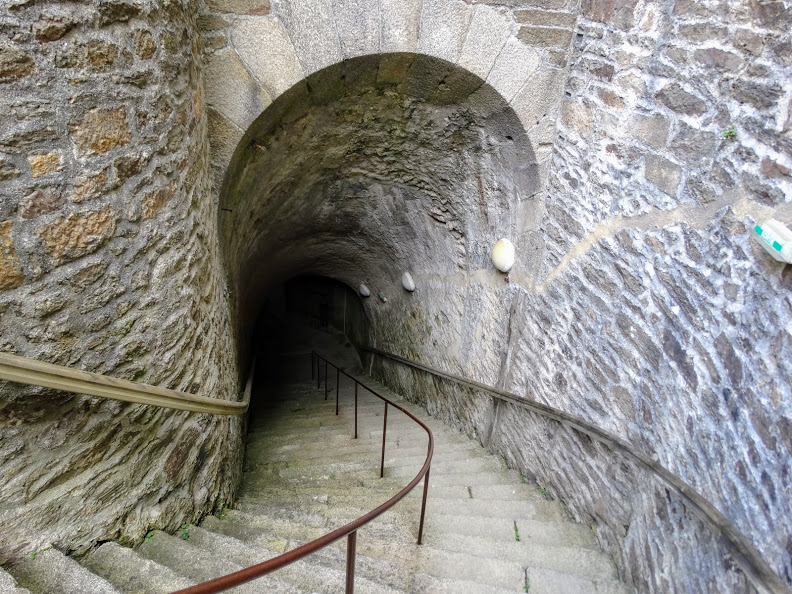
Stairway to the dungeon

Arriving at Le Folgoët on 19 August, the end of her pilgrimage, Anne showed a desire to continue to Brest and contemplate the powerful castle that her father Francis II had embellished and modernised and the large nef Marie La Cordelière, one of the largest warships of the era.

Important works of fortification were begun at the castle throughout the 15th century. The castle was adapted for the new weapon of the age - artillery. To make its medieval curtain walls withstand metal cannonballs they were thickened by 5m and the tour Madeleine was built, then the tour Paradis, a logis-porte to defend the entrance.

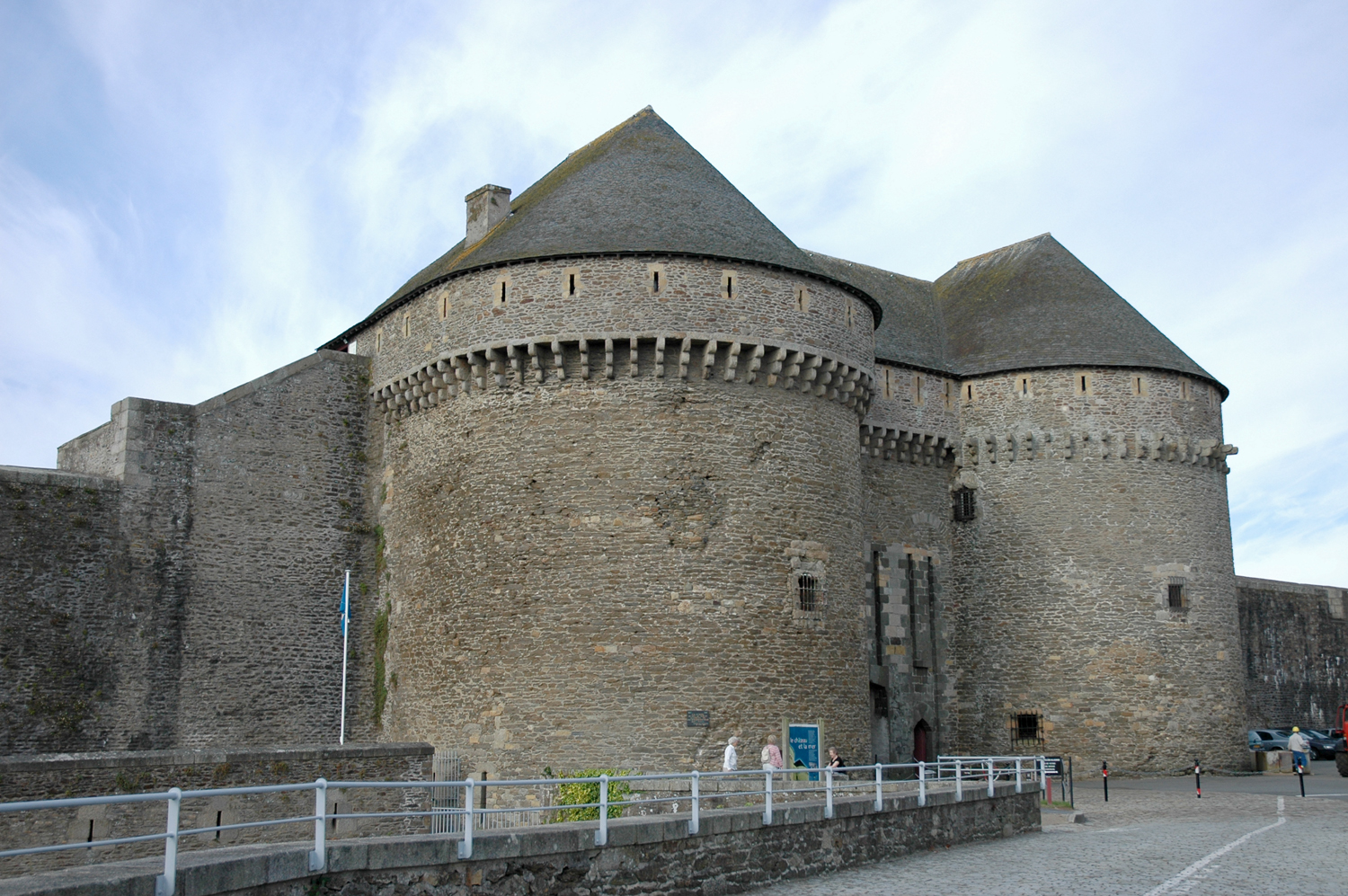
The tours Paradis

At the end of August, the queen's imposing court arrived at the castle gates. The bells of the castle's chapel to the Trinity rang to welcome her and she descended from her white-framed travelling-litter. Escorted by several gentlemen, surrounded by ladies in waiting, and followed by valets and piqueurs, she crossed the drawbridge of the first ditch surrounding the ravelin. This triangular work commanding the main gate was at this era known as a moineau or cornichon. Crowned with machicoulis, this work covered casemates with loopholes. Its ogivale gate was adorned with the French coat-of-arms surrounded by the cordon of Saint-Michel and surmounted by an open fleur-de-lys crown. Passing through it, Anne doubtless saw this symbol, carved in Breton stone 16 years before as a reminder of the castle's submission to France. Her procession finally entered the castle proper across the drawbridge of the Porte Royale. This gate with an open door, closed by a "herse", has an ogivale opening. This collection of buildings was covered by the Tours Paradis - two semicircular towers crowned with machicoulis and tiles. In this era, the curtain walls on both sides of it were still flanked by their Gallo-Roman turrets.

Within the walls there was little new construction work, barring the chapel to the Trinity where pious queen Anne was received. The city overall consisted of modest houses, having expanded up to the border of the castle enclosure (at the end of the 15th century it had 260 houses, making around 1300 inhabitants).

The queen and her small court marked a path running along a ravine at the foot of which was a fountain and washhouses giving access to a postern which gave onto a forward work entitled "Fer à cheval". In this era, there was no quay and so the rotonda was washed by the sea. It was from this building that they could admire La Cordelière. Back under sail, the carrack Amirale was resplendent under the castle walls. The port had no military fleet. Its position off the major trade routes meant that it was not a busy port, but the fortress continued to have major strategic significance, holding around 500 men and with the most important armament in the whole of Brittany (100 firearms, including nearly 50 cannons).

When duchess Anne stayed at the castle, it was no longer only a fortress but also a modern and spacious ducal residence, hosting noble visitors in its keep. It was in the keep that the dukes of Brittany stayed during their stays in Brest, reached by a third bridge across a ditch and entering via a low-architrave arched gate, showing a lion hold the shield of Brittany. However, their large court was used to larger spaces. The Tour du Midi (despite its great hall and oratory with Gothic windows), the lordly kitchens and the vast roads were not enough and so the queen did not remain long in Brest.

=== The league ===
René de Rieux, lord of Sourdéac

The populace is cruel, barbarous and bedevilled against the League, it is armed to the number of 15 or 20 thousand, and the town and castle of Brest are infinitely inconvenient, with monsieur de Chasteauneuf as their governor, making it the only place in lower Brittany held for the king. (Memoirs of Montmartin).

Rosampoul, son of Jérôme de Carné, became the castle's captain on 12 June 1580 and rallied to the League, but he was little appreciated by the population and quickly had to give over the captaincy to Guy de Rieux, lord of Châteauneuf. The king's lieutenant general was handed over thanks to these relations in the town, at the end of September 1589. The faithful Guy de Rieux held Brest for the Protestant king Henry IV. The situation at Brest was secure enough for the new governor to leave the following year for the siege of Hennebont. His arms are now to be seen on the tour Duchesse Anne. The command of Brest next passed to his brother René de Rieux, lord of Sourdéac, who also mounted vigorous anti-League operations.

In 1592, the royal seat of justice was transferred to Saint-Renan. In June, 5 to 6,000 League troops invested Recouvrance, to try to make the citadel fall. Supported by the Spanish, they besieged the castle in vain for 5 months. The garrison repulsed the assaults and cut the besiegers to pieces. As a reward for the faithful services, on 31 December 1593 the inhabitants of Brest received the rights of bourgeoisie "like the inhabitants of Bordeaux".

Convinced that a siege of Brest was doomed to fail, the League troops decided the following spring to blockade the roadstead and starve the castle into surrender. They counted on help from their Spanish allies, who had been present in Brittany for two years. Elisabeth came to the aid of Henry IV, deploying 2,400 men in the Léon. Uncertain of Elisabeth's intentions, Sourdéac refused to host an English garrison equal to that of the French and thereby to respect the terms of the treaty signed by the king as a collateral for loans from England.

12 Spanish vessels disembarked their men and materials in spring 1594 at Camaret. Colonel Don Juan del Aquila disembarked the men and materials needed to build an important fortification. Built on what is now called pointe des Espagnols by Cristobal de Rojas and named "Castilla de Léon", it possessed a strategic position facing the English coasts. It also aimed to make them master of Brest castle by blocking its access to the sea through the Goulet at its narrowest point. Its guns' field of fire crossed with those of another battery built on the north bank of the Goulet and thus blocked all resupply of Brest by sea. Headed by Jean, duke of Aumont, marshal of France and aided by the English ships and troops, the royal army besieged the fort from mid-October. It was strongly defended by 400 Spanish farouches under captain Praxède. Despite 3,000 Frenchmen, 2,000 Englishmen, 300 mounted arquebusiers and 400 gentlemen, it only finally fell on 18 November 1594.

=== Vauban's citadel ===
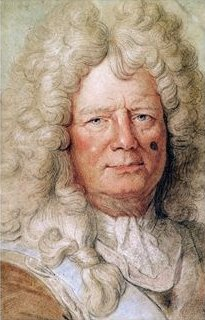
Vauban

In 1631, wishing to give France a strong navy, cardinal Richelieu began works at Brest, which he had as a favour. It was at this era that it became a true military port.

…Brest, the great military port, the thought of Richelieu, the hand of Louis XIV; strong, arsenal and prison, cannons and warships, armies and millions, the force of France piled up at France's mouth…

However, it was Colbert, effectively Minister for the Navy, who gave Brest a real boost to its growth by his development of its arsenal from 1669 onwards. The intendant Pierre Chertemps de Seuil was responsible for the initial construction projects on the arsenal between 1670 and 1680. Reinforced and modernised, the castle still defended the premier port of the royal fleet. In 1680, a new battery completed the castle to the south-west to guarantee the defence of the harbour entrance. To the north-east an imposing bastioned fort "à la Vauban" protected the harbour approaches. The town's population thus began to expand substantially, especially when it was merged with Recouvrance in 1681. Pierre Massiac de Sainte-Colombe's project for modernising the defences of the town, arsenal and their surroundings was initiated that year and taken over and transformed by Vauban in May 1683 to 1695. He destroyed the last Roman towers and the pepper-pot roofs of the keep. In this era the defences protected the castle effectively against attack from the sea, but the fortress had to defend above all against a landborne attack should an English fleet succeed in disembarking troops on the coast. The castle became a citadel, overlooking the town, the countryside and their surroundings all at once.

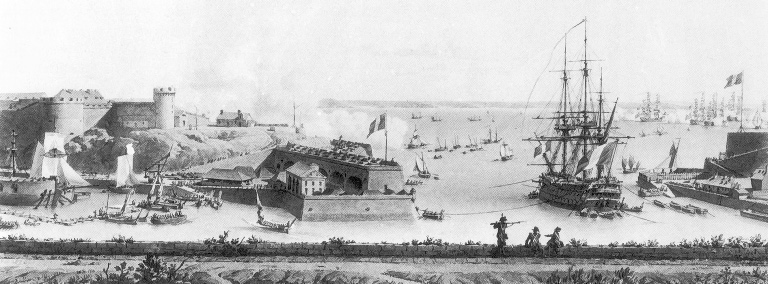
The castle and outer harbour seen from the rempart de Recouvrance

A glacis, a covered road, and half-moons prolonged the fortifications on the landward side. The parapets were redesigned and given plunging embrasures. To form a vast artillery platform, the tour Duchesse Anne and the tour Nord were linked by a new work. Only the tours Paradis retained the medieval appearance. The curtain walls were widened, and a fausse-braie built to reinforce the wall between tour Madeleine and the tours Paradis against artillery fire. Batteries at the mouth of the goulet, at Camaret and Bertheaume, were also built. The interventions of Vauban were the last major stage in the castle's evolution.

=== Statue of Louis XVI ===
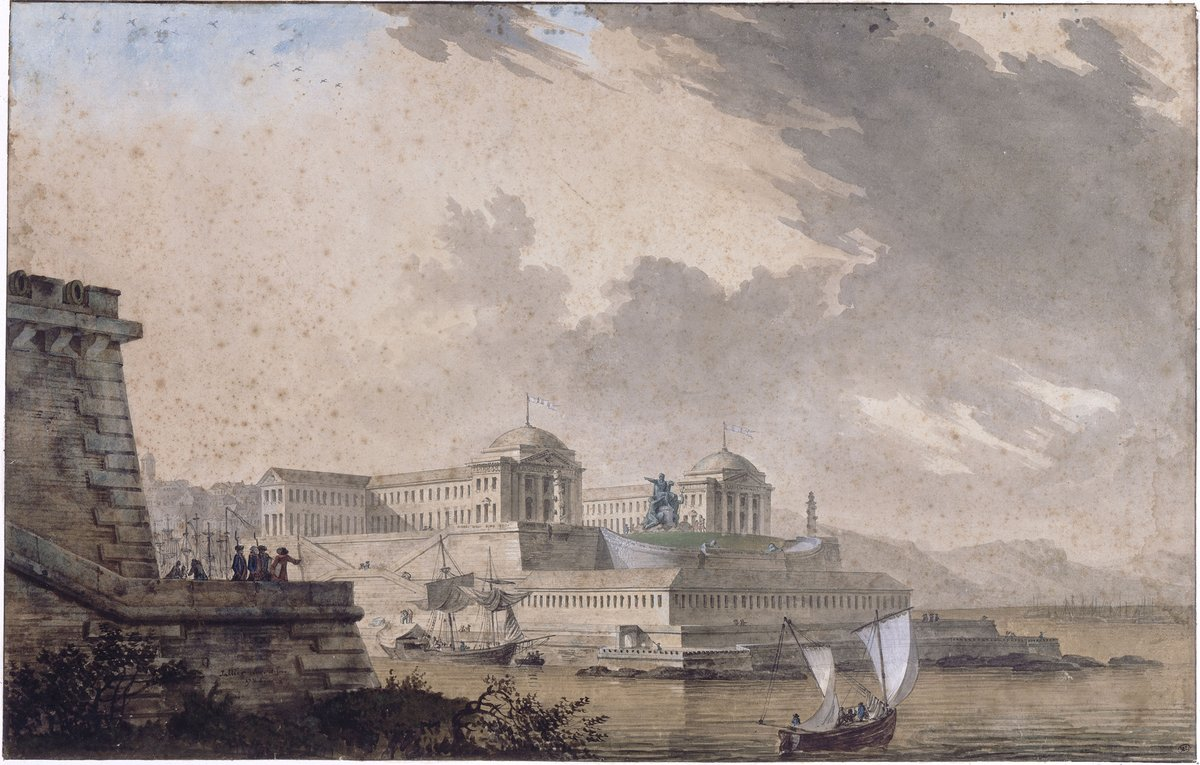
Project of M. Jallier de Savault

In 1785, Louis XVI launched a major construction project at the castle to mark his recognition of the town. Leadership of this project of was put under the direction of M. Jallier de Savault. Notably he oversaw the erection at the town's highest point of a monumental statue of Louis. It would have to be built on the site of the tour César.

so that no ship, small or large, could enter the roadstead, no movement made in the port, no salute be given or returned, without the King in some way seeing them and presiding over them. - M. Jallier de Savault

The project was made up of, at the end of the rue du château, an oval "place d'armes", planted in trees. From this place to the extremity of the Parc-au-Duc, the rue Royale, a wide street allowed it to face the roadstead.

with some emotion, the public would see a monument to Louis XVI handing privileges to Brittany and the liberty of the seas, raised on the ruins of a building dedicated to this Caesar who enchained the whole world and submitted it to the Romans. - M. Jallier de Savault

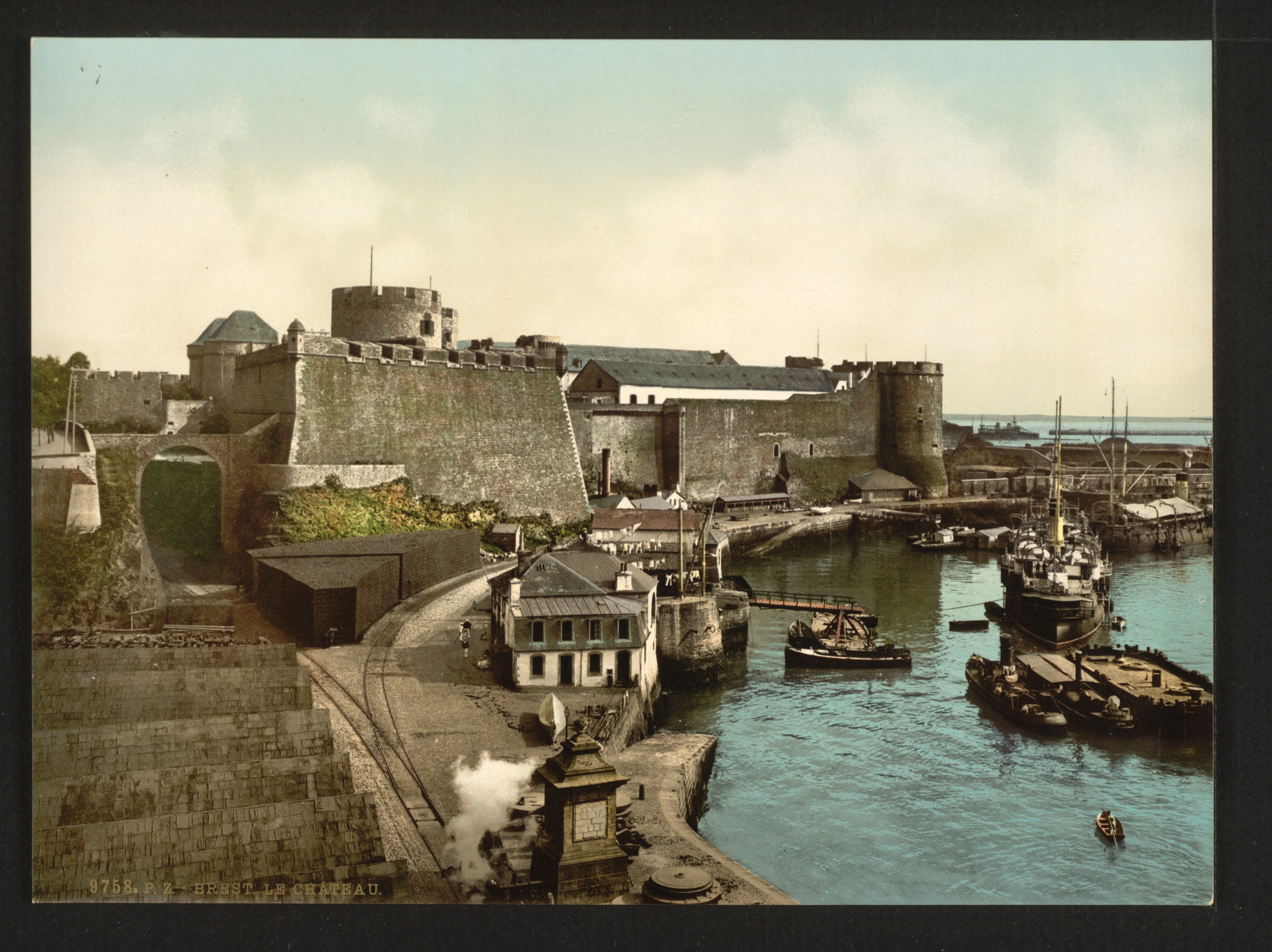
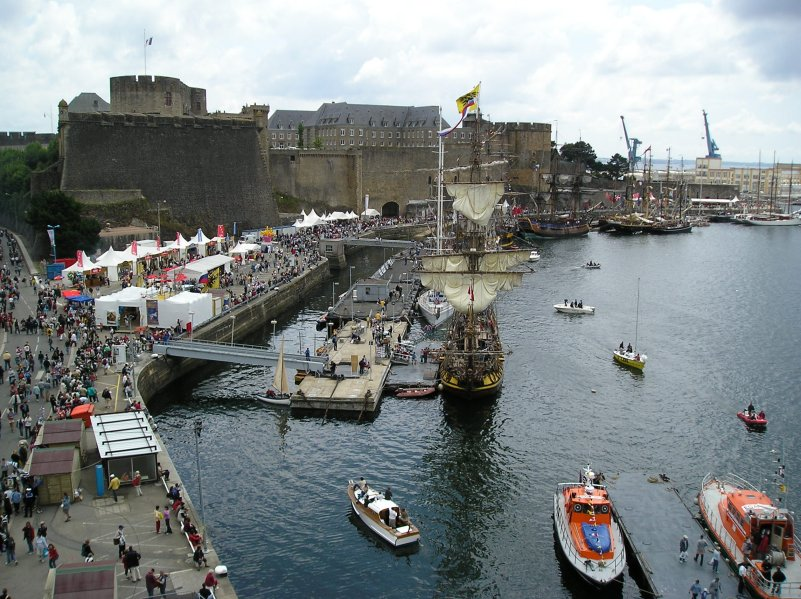
The Château in the 1890s (top) and during the fête de Brest 2004 (bottom)

This project would, without qualms, have erased 14 centuries of history, but in April 1788 the Comte d'Hector, commander of the French Navy, declared that the project was incompatible with the naval works he envisaged on the Parc-au-Duc site. Events, in any case, would have prevented the plan being carried out.

=== Second World War - the final siege ===
Brest fell into German hands on 19 June 1940 and the citadel was occupied by their troops, with the tours Paradis once again serving as a prison (this time for those condemned to deportation). From a terre-plein reclaimed from the sea in 1931, the Germans built underground works into the cliff from which the castle could be accessed.

After the Germans' retreat following D-Day, "Fortress Brest" became one of the pockets of German resistance. It was commanded by General Ramcke, of the 2nd Parachute Division. In August 1944, Allied troops arrived in front of Brest's ramparts. The civil population was invited to evacuate on 7 August. The place du Château was particularly affected by the bombardments of 14 August in preparation for an assault. On 25 August General Ramcke issued the order "I count on every parachutist doing his duty to the utmost with a fanatical zeal. The 1st Division was immortalised at Monte Cassino. The 2nd will be immortalised at Brest."

The castle was the subject of bombardment again from the afternoon of 2 September, with the pont National being destroyed the following day. The drama of the explosion at the abri Sadi-Carnot occurred on the night of 8/9 September. The siege of the town lasted 43 days and it finally fell to the Allied force under General Middleton on 18 September. After having refused to surrender, General Ramcke left for Crozon with a handful of fanatics, but ended up giving himself up on 23 September. Although it bore scars from the fighting, the castle remained firmly established on its bedrock, though the barracks built by the Nazis had been razed and would not be rebuilt.

=== Today ===
The last buildings were ceded to the French Navy in 1945 and restoration of the whole castle began, for it to house the Maritime Prefecture for the Second Region and the commander-in-chief for the Atlantic. The seat of the maritime commander had until then been in hôtel Saint-Pierre, since 23 September 1797. A new central building was built to designs by the architects Niermans and Gutb, and completed and occupied in 1953. Its great gallery leading to the Directors' Council Room houses the portrait of the prefect's 150 predecessors since 1636.

The maritime prefect's residence replaced the signal station on Parc au Duc, which had itself been replaced by a watchtower built at the top of the tour César. The underground works built by the Germans house the naval command centre for the Atlantic and for the Force océanique stratégique.

== Architecture ==
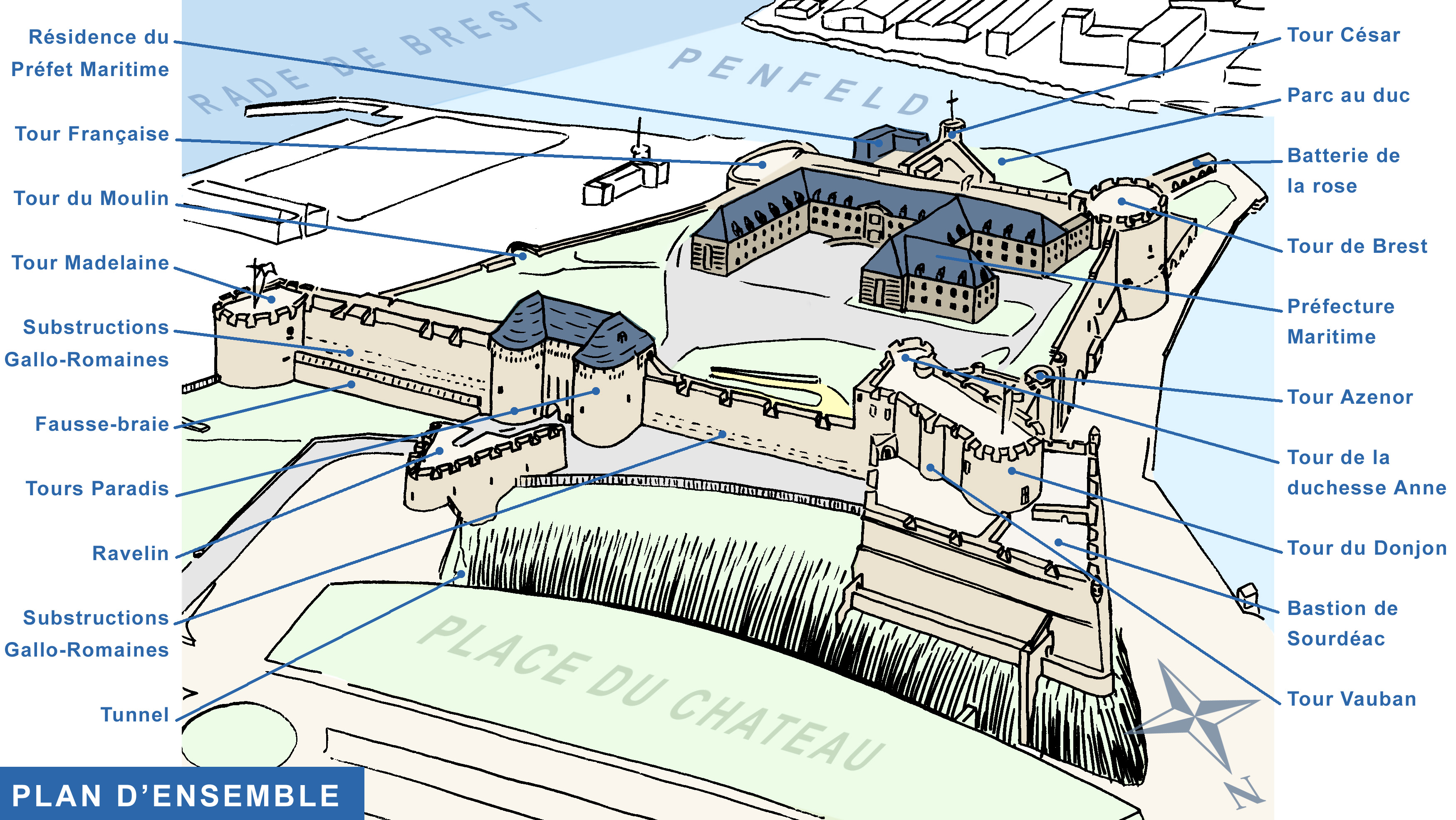

=== 13th century- The tour César ===
Dating to the 3rd century, the tour César was built on the possible remains of a Gallo-Roman tower, and this is one of the possible origins of its name. It has served as an office, lodgings, prison, magazine and finally supporting the signal station controlling movements in the port.

It stands in front of the south-west facade, to which it is attached by two curtain walls forming a redoubt. A postern with a drawbridge allows the tower to be accessed from outside the castle. Although sealed off, this postern is visible from the garden of the prefect's residence.

=== Keep ===
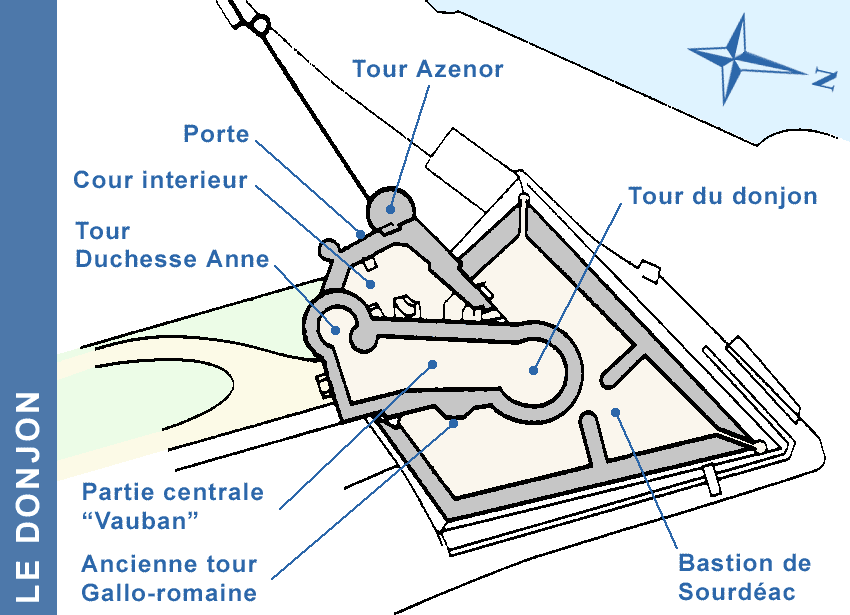
The keep

Located in the north-east angle of the enclosure, the keep is actually the former citadel of the medieval closed-town and the heart of the medieval defensive system, forming a small castle on its own isolated from the rest of the site. In origin it was made up of three main towers linked by curtain walls - to the south, the tour Duchesse Anne, to the north the tour du Donjon, to the west the tour Azénor. The main entrance was from the west, formed of a crenelated gate and a drawbridge across the moat separating the citadel from the rest of the castle-town. This collection of works formed a polygonal courtyard, at 2.2m below present ground level, housing a well, oubliettes and several underground rooms.

Flanked by the bastion de Sourdéac, with one tower of the keep reinforced, the keep was completed by Vauban from 1683 onwards. One wall and vaulted rooms linked the tour du Midi and the tour du Donjon, and the keep's pepper-pot roofs vanished in favour of vast platforms for powerful artillery pieces. Finally, in the 19th century, the keep was pierced by bays. The first floor now houses the main rooms of the port archive, and the upper floor houses an oratory and the library of the French Navy.

==== The tour Azenor (13th century) ====
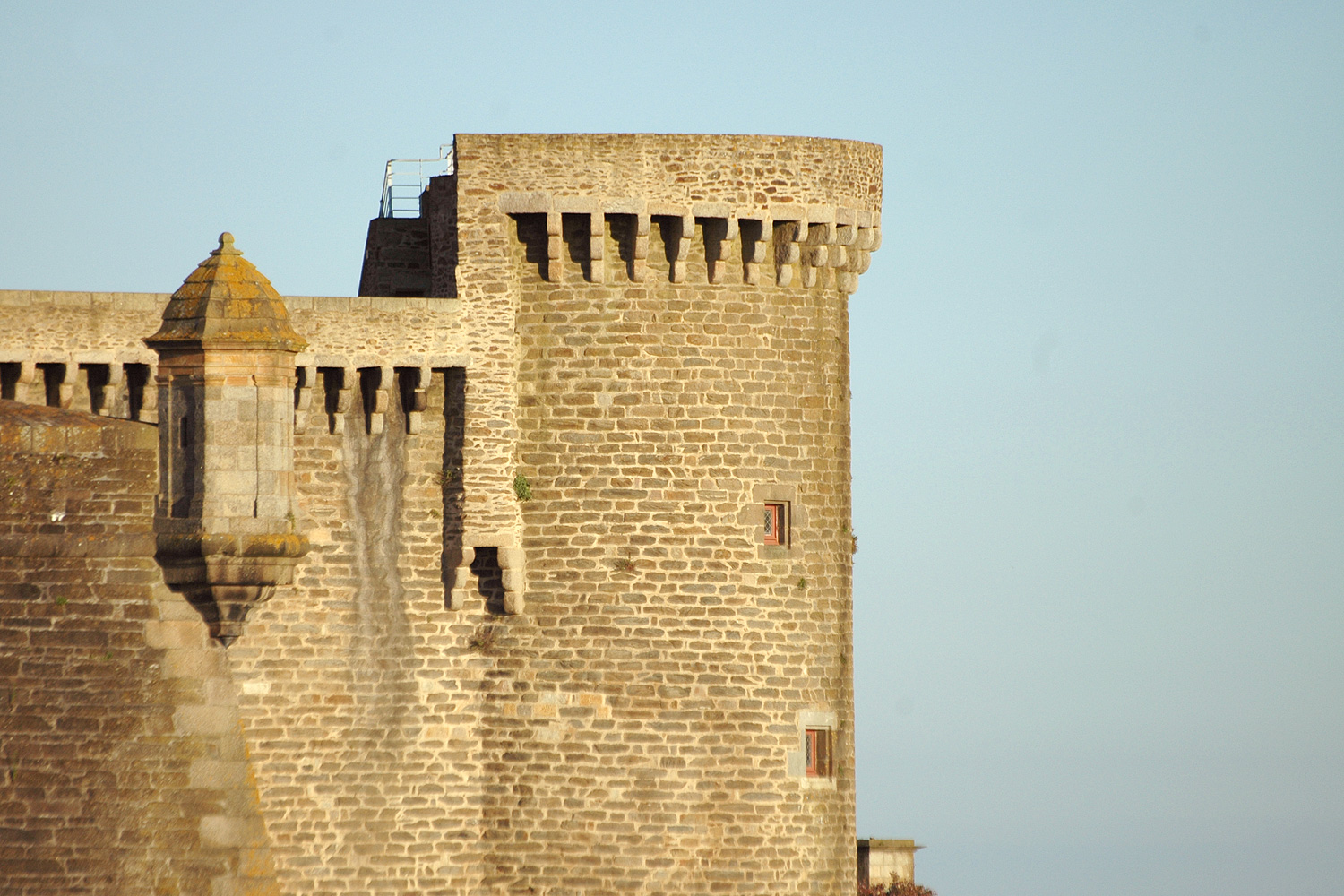
La Tour Azenor

The present tower was built in the 13th century on the ruins of the previous one. Its two lower levels are accessible from the courtyard via a staircase built into the thickness of the wall. They serve as stores and magazines. The two upper levels, reserved for habitation, are cut off from the roads and reached from a wall-walk. Inside these floors are octagonal rooms, whose plans do not exactly superimpose one floor on the other. They have been little modified apart from Vauban's alteration to the roof. It was abandoned in the 19th century and the only access is from the courtyards, the main entrance having been neglected.

Its name originates in the legend of Princess Azenor reported to us by the Dominican Albert Le Grand in his "Lives of the Saints". It is a common hagiographic plot, also adapted in Chaucer's The Man of Law's Prologue and Tale in his The Canterbury Tales.

...Azenor was rich in form, right for a [martyr's] palm, beautiful like a star, and this external beauty was nothing in comparison with her love.

Even, lord of Brest, had only one child, named Azenor. Around 537, she married the Count of Goëlo. The young married couple set themselves up in a castle built by King Audren (Chatelaudren). Widowed, Even remarried, and Azenor's stepmother never ceased to embarrass her stepdaughter. Jealous, she swore to get rid of Azenor. She accused her of adultery with the aid of false witnesses. The count of Goëlo believed this calumny and the princess was shut up in the castle's darkest tower. Condemned to death, she escaped the stake when it was learned she was pregnant. The judges, probably bought for gold, condemned her to be placed in a barrel and set adrift at sea. The barrel floated for 5 months. Each day, an angel visited the daughter of the prince of Léon to bring her all she needed. After a perilous voyage, Azenor landed on the bank of the Beauport in Ireland, where she gave birth to a son. She named him Budoc, or 'saved from the waters', and he became a great saint. Her stepmother's death, during her exile, avowing the truth to Azenor's husband. He decided to set out to look for her to pardon her and take her back as his wife, but he died on their return after having searched long for her, followed shortly afterwards by his wife. Even welcomed his grandson to his court and raised him to the nobility.

==== The tour de la Duchesse Anne (or tour du midi) (14th century) ====
This tower initially formed the castle's tour du logis during the Middle Ages. Its defensive side was turned towards the inside of the enclosure and on each of its four levels it had one rectangular and one hexagonal room. Its construction and its modifications gave it an increasingly perfect autonomy. It housed a kitchen, apartments, cellars pierced by firing-embrasures, an internal gallery and lighting bays. It contained an oratory within the governor's apartments.

==== The armouries of Guy de Rieux (1589) ====

In 1589, the castle's governor embraced the Catholic League, but Guy de Rieux, captain of the royal army, made him hand Brest over, thus becoming the only Breton city to back Henry IV. De Rieux's arms were carved in the castle's stones (1589). He died at sea returning from the siege of Hennebont in Morbihan in December 1590, and was succeeded by his brother. After the Second World War these arms were found in rubble near the keep and embedded in the wall of the keep in restoration work during the 1950s.

==== The bastion Sourdéac (16th century) ====
Several attempted English landings in the mid-16th century on this site solidified the threat of attack against the castle and encouraged the French to build a stronger fortification there. The work of an Italian engineer, Pietro Frédance, this trapezoid-plan bastion envelops the keep on its northern side and protects it from landborne attack. The first stone of it was laid in December 1560 and its construction took 37 years.

It is made up of a vast artillery platform and a set of underground casemates whose wide embrasures cover the entrance to the port. It is reached by a wide staircase opening into the keep's courtyard. A small staircase serves a guichet (now obstructed) at the foot of the bastion, at the outside of these casemates. A counter-mine gallery bypasses the foundations of tour du donjon at 15m underground, below the terre-plein. Off it leads a second series of casemates, covering the main gate and the north courtyard of the façade. These are now buried under a parking embankment. The collection of works is topped off by échauguettes placed at its corners, such as figureheads.

==== The tour du donjon (16th century) ====
Built in 1597 by Sourdéac, on the site of a ruined (probably Gallo-Roman) tower.

=== The barracks in 1894 ===
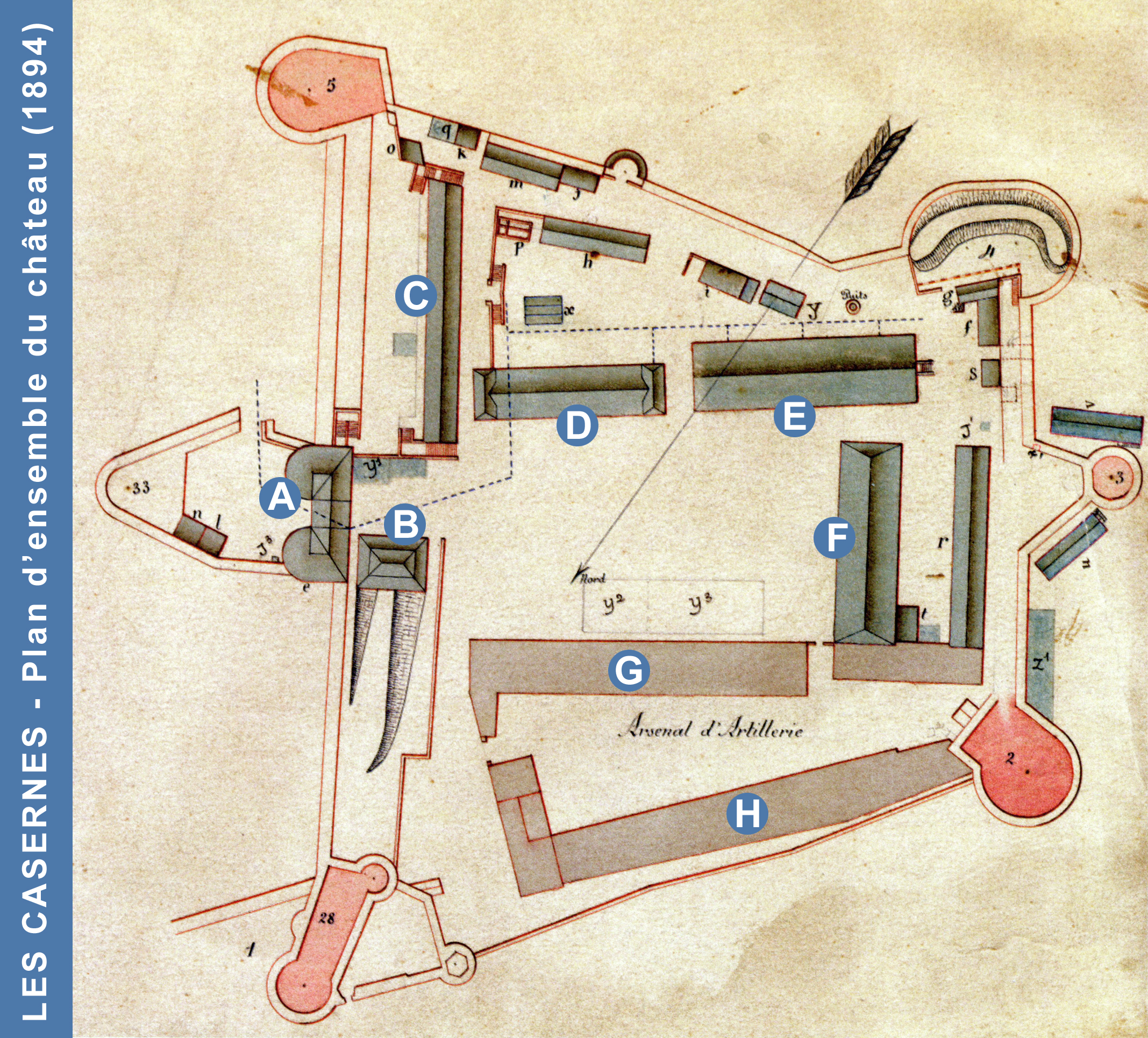

A - Paradis Barracks

B - Site Offices and Intendent's Offices, former civil prison (1822–1859)

C - Esplanade Barracks, serving the infirmary, backed by the south curtain wall (some remains)

D - Plougastel Barracks, built 1591–1624 by Sourdéac (classed as a historic monument in 1923)

E - Monsieur Barracks, serving the armoury (1822–1825)

F - César Barracks (completed in 1766)

G - Armoury, on the site of the lodgings for the site's major and for the king's lieutenant

H - Artillery magazines, built in 1777 and 1624 by Sourdéac (classed as a historic monument in 1923)

=== The Triumph of Amphitrite ===
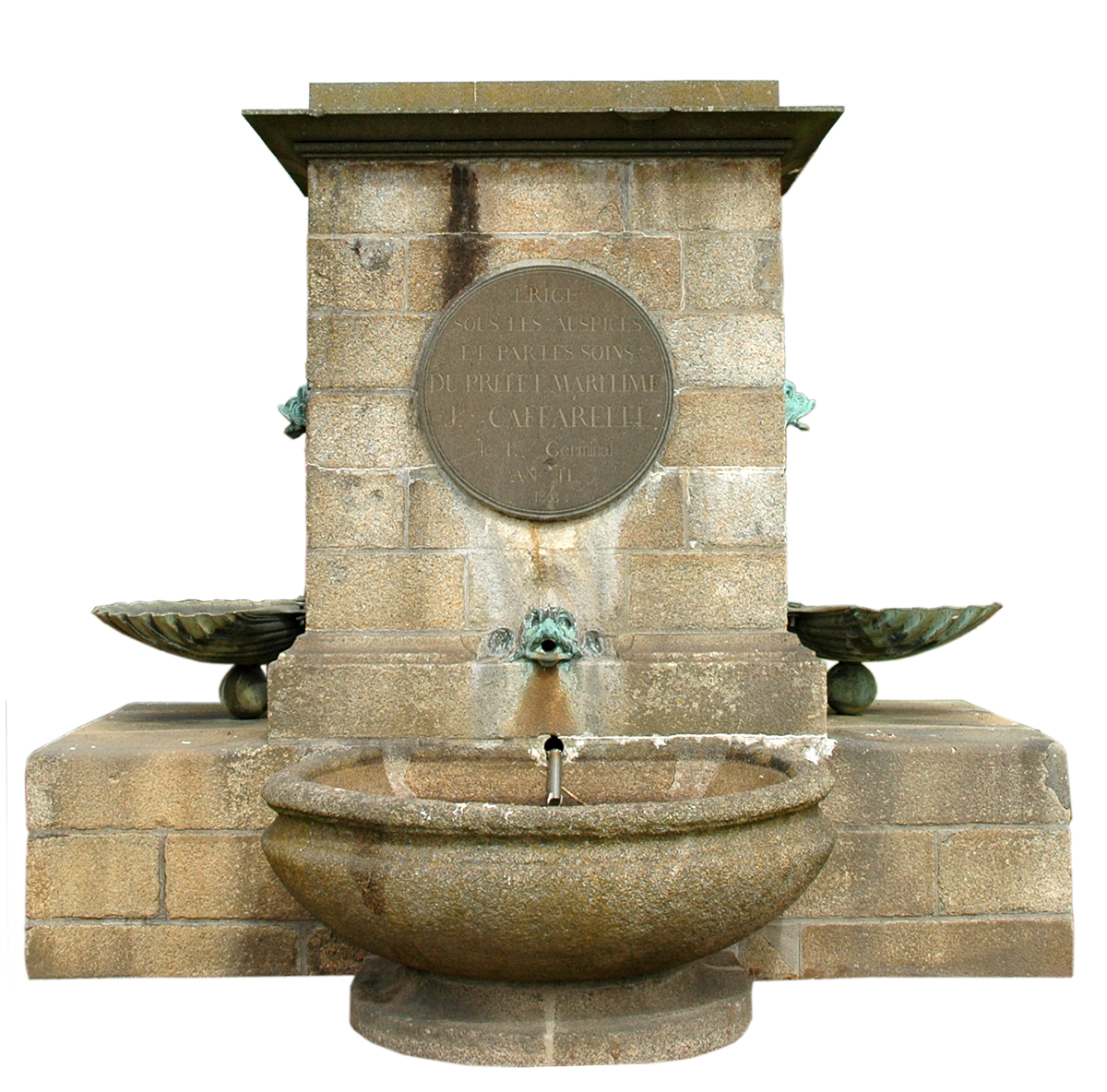
The base

Becoming a historic monument in its own right, the base of the "Triomphe d'Amphitrite" is in the courtyard of the Préfecture Maritime. This pedestal, with a statue and fountain inaugurated in 1803, is adorned with three tritons fixed to a column pouring out water into three basins. It is the work of the engineer Tarbé de Vauxclairs.

The white marble statue of Amphitrite by Antoine Coysevox, taken from the jardins de Marly where they formed part of the 1706 cascade de Marly by the Consulate, was set up by the Préfet maritime Caffarelli near the building now known as porte Tourville. Prefect Chaucheprat had it transplanted from the square (then being redesigned) to the gardens of the home of the Préfecture Maritime from 1800 to 1944, the former hôtel Saint-Pierre on the south side of the rue de Siam in the town centre. In 1940 Brest artistic and historical treasures were kept in safety in the château de Kerjean, and on the liberation the pedestal was dismantled and reerected in the castle and the statue moved to the musée du Louvre.

== Musée national de la Marine ==
Since 1955, the castle has also housed collections from the Musée national de la Marine. This makes it a kind of heir to the ship models room installed on the first floor of the sculpture workshop in the Brest arsenal in 1826. The collections evacuated during the Second World War were transferred into the tours Paradis in 1958. In 2018, the Napoleonic imperial barge of 1810 was removed from display in the Paris museum to be restored for return to Brest and display here. An extension to the museum in the keep was completed in 1985.

It displays famous sculptures by Yves Collet (Mars, Amphitrite, Minerve and Neptune, guarding the road), ship models, sculptures paintings and other objects related to the development of the prison, the military port, the naval constructions and maritime life of Brest.

== See also ==
- Ponant fleet

== Bibliography ==
- (in French) La monographie du château de Brest (origines - Description - Documents), de M. Fleury.
- (in French) le château de Brest, de François Bellec, édition de la cité, 1978, (ISBN 2851860100).
- (in French) Finistère, collection : le patrimoine des communes de France, édition Flohic.
- (in French) Histoire de Brest, de Jim et Joël Sévellec, éditions le Télégramme, 1955.
- (in French) Brest mémoire océane, Alain Boulaire et Alain Coz, éditions le Progrès.
- (in French) Le château de Brest, les carnets de bord, Musée national de la Marine (ISBN 9782901421337).
- (in French) Brest face à la mer, trois siècles de marine et d'arsenal, de Bernard Cros, Jacques Littoux et Jacques Ronot, éditions le Télégramme 2005, (ISBN 2-84833-143-7).
- (in French) Brest "Souvenirs…Souvenir…", Annie Henwood, René Le Bihan, (ISBN 2-9114340-1-3).
