= Étienne Tardif de Pommeroux de Bordesoulle =

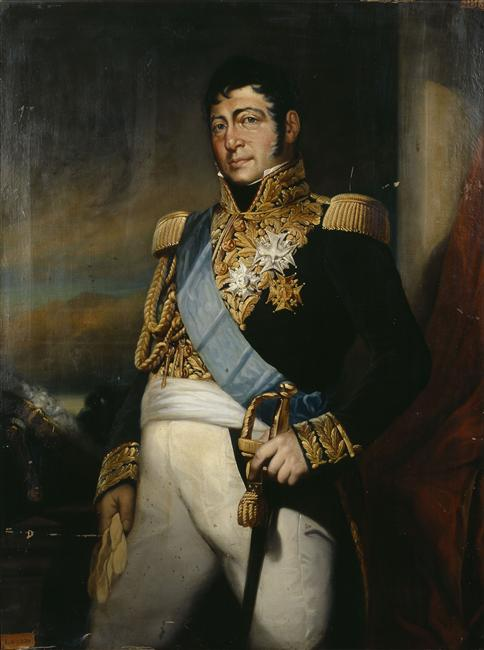
- General Count Bordessoule, painting by Jean-François Brémond
- Born: 4 April 1771; Luzeret, Indre
- Died: 3 October 1837 (aged 66); Fontaine-Chaalis, Oise
- Military career
- Conflicts: French Revolutionary Wars; Napoleonic Wars; Peninsular War; Spanish Expedition
- Awards: Name engraved on the Arc de Triomphe

Étienne Tardif de Pommeroux, comte de Bordesoulle (French pronunciation: [etjɛn taʁdif də pɔmʁu də bɔʁdsul]; 4 April 1771, in Luzeret – 3 October 1837, in Fontaine-Chaalis, Oise) was a French nobleman and soldier, who fought in the Napoleonic Wars and the Spanish expedition.

== Life ==
=== Early career ===
He entered the army in 1789 at private rank, in the 2nd mounted chasseurs regiment and fought with distinction in nearly all the campaigns of the French Revolutionary Wars in the armies fighting on the River Rhine, and then from 1792 to year 1801 in the armée du Rhin, the armée de Rhin-et-Moselle, the armée d'Allemagne, the armée d'Angleterre, the armée de Mayence, the armée d'Italie. Wounded several times, Bordessoulle was made sous-lieutenant in August 1794, then lieutenant in July 1796 and captain in January 1798. He fought with panache at Novi on 15 August 1799, being wounded again whilst covering the army's retreat. He rose rapidly through the ranks, being promoted to chef d'escadron in the 6th Hussards in May 1799 and receiving an honorary sabre in 1802.

=== Light cavalry ===
He served in the Bruges camp in 1803 and 1804. He then fought in the campaigns of 1805 to 1807 in Austria, Prussia and Poland in the 2nd corps of the Grande Armée, rising to colonel of the 22nd regiment of chasseurs on 27 December 1805. He next fought at Austerlitz on 2 December before being transferred to 4th corps under Soult in October 1806. On 9 June 1807, at the head of 60 men from his regiment, he crossed the Guttstadt passage, charged and completely tore to pieces a Russian battalion, and received two bayonet wounds on his right forearm and in the chest. He distinguished himself again at Heilsberg the following day and at Friedland on 12 June, and was made général de brigade of the light cavalry (9th Hussards, 7th and 20th Chasseurs) on 25 June. On 1 August he was moved to Brune's army corps and in December was put in charge of the light cavalry attached to the defence of Danzig.

On 21 September 1808 he was ordered to go to Bayonne, and that November he was made commander of the 2nd brigade of mounted chasseurs (the cavalry reserve of the armée d'Espagne) within Lasalle's division. In December he destroyed the remains of Francisco Javier Castaños's army around Madrid and on 28 March 1809 contributed to the French victory at Medellín, leading the 5th and 10th chasseurs in destroying 6,000 Spanish infantrymen even whilst marshal Belluno's whole corps was retreating and even though Bordesoulle had himself received orders to retreat.

=== Cuirassiers ===
Recalled to the armée d'Allemagne on 25 May 1809 to command a cavalry brigade in Masséna's 4th corps. Bordesoulle set out for Germany and on arrival replaced Fouler as head of 2nd brigade of the 3rd cuirassiers division. He was wounded at the battle of Wagram on 6 July and made a baron of the Empire by Napoleon in May 1810. He was employed in the observation corps in Holland in May 1810 and put in command of the 3rd light cavalry brigade of the armée d'Allemagne on 2 December. From 1810 to 1812, Bordessoulle commanded several light cavalry brigades in Germany, a period during which he also spent time in the army's observation corps on the River Elbe (during November 1811). That observation corps became a corps of the Grande Armée and so in June 1812 Bordesoulle was summoned to head that corps 2nd light cavalry brigade.

During the French invasion of Russia he served in the light cavalry of Davout's 1st corps. On 30 June he fought Barclay de Tolly's vanguard at Soleschniki, and on 23 July commanded marshal prince d'Eckmuhl's vanguard, made up of the 3rd regiment of chasseurs and one infantry regiment. At the head of that vanguard he captured Mohilev, 900 prisoners, the enemy magazines and baggage train, and over 600 oxen intended for prince Bagration. He fought again at Smolensk on 15 April 1812, at Borodino on 7 September (receiving a broken-jaw from a long-range biscaïen shot) and at Krasnoë (where he took 8 cannons after capturing a corps of 1,500 men, broken an infantry square, taken 300 more prisoners and leaving the 9th Polish lancers gravely compromised).

He was promoted to général de division on 4 December 1812 and put in command of the 1st division of cuirassiers of the Grande Armée's 1st cavalry corps, which he led in all the major battles of the Saxony campaign of 1813 (such as Lützen on 2 May, and Bautzen on 21 May). Already confirmed as a baron of the Empire by being given a dotation, he was made a commander of the Légion d'honneur on 14 May 1813. At the battle of Dresden on 26 August he led several vigorous charges, broke 12 enemy infantry squares, took 6,000 prisoners and helped force the large enemy force threatening the French army to retreat into the mountains of Bohemia. He then fought at the battle of Leipzig on 16 to 19 October, where he gave new evidence of his bravery - at Hanau, where he supported a largely orderly retreat and with only a few men calmed a fearful large cavalry body. In November he was put in command of the 2nd cavalry corps of the Grande Armée in place of Sébastiani.

Made the commander of two cavalry divisions gathered at Versailles on 3 January 1814, Bordessoulle fought in the battles of Champaubert and had a hand in the French success against Blücher at Vauchamps on 12 February. He then beat the Allied force at Villeneuve on 17 February, took part in the recapture of Reims on 13 March and the Battle of La Fère-Champenoise on 25 March and finally commanded a heavy cavalry division of 1st corps in the Battle of Paris on 30 March.

=== Bourbon loyalist ===
On the first return of the Bourbon monarchy, Bordesoulle's noble origins got him an appointment as inspector general of the cavalry in May 1814, knight of the order of Saint Louis on 2 June and grand officer of the Légion d'honneur on 23 August. On Napoleon's return from Elba, Bordesoulle took provisional command of 9 cavalry squadrons of the 2nd military division headed for Châlons on 12 March 1815 and was confirmed in this role by the royal government on 16 March. He followed Louis XVIII to Ghent, where he was made chief of staff to the Comte d'Artois (later Charles X of France) on 25 June 1815. He returned to France with the Duke of Berry in July 1815 after the Hundred Days and was made grand-cross of the Légion d'honneur by the king on 13 August and on appointed to command and reorganise the cavalry of the Royal Guard on 8 September. Bordesoulle was then elected a centre-right député for Indre in the "Chambre introuvable" of 1815–1816, and on 12 October was made a member of the commission charged with investigating the conduct of officers during the Hundred Days.

On 13 May 1816 he was made a commander of the order of Saint Louis, and exchanged his Napoleonic title of baron for the Bourbon one of comte. An honorary aide-de-camp to the comte d'Artois from 2 June 1817, and a member of the committee of the inspectors-general on 25 October, he became a privy councillor of the comte d'Artois on 2 July 1820. He was made a grand-cross of Saint Louis on 1 May 1821 and was made governor of the École polytechnique on 17 September 1822, all the while retaining his role in the Royal Guard. In 1823, he took part in the Spanish expedition. Summoned on 16 February 1823 to be commander-in-chief of the guard-troops within the armée des Pyrénées, Bordesoulle organised the bombardment and blockade of Cádiz and was mentioned in despatches on 31 August for his part in the taking of Trocadéro.

After the war, he was made a peer of France on 9 October and received the grand-cross of the order of Charles III on 4 November the same years. His opinions were strongly patriotic and constitutional. His advice to the comte d'Artois was crucial in getting many acts friendly to friends of liberty passed: these included the ordinance of Andujar, imposed by Ferdinand VII of Spain. In the month of December he resumed his command of the Royal Guard's cavalry division. On Louis XVIII's death, Charles X did not keep Bordesoulle on as an honorary aide-de-camp in the new army list of 4 November 1824, and he became a member of the superior council for war in 1828.

Made a knight commander of the order of the Holy Spirit, in the chapter held on 21 February 1830, he tried in vain to enact the king's resolutions in July and during the "Three Glorious Days" retired to Saint-Cloud, ready to defend his person. He was at Rambouillet only to leave it, continuing to exercise his command in the dissolved Royal Guard until 21 August, at which date he put himself at the disposal of Louis Philippe I. Put on the reserve list with the rank of état-major général on 7 February 1831, he was allowed to retire on 14 March 1832. He remained on the sidelines from then on, though he still occasionally attended the Chambre des pairs from then until his death in 1837.
