= Charles Ambroise de Caffarelli du Falga =

Charles Ambroise de Caffarelli du Falga (1758, Falga – 1826), baron Caffarelli, was canon of Toul before the French Revolution and one of the Caffarelli brothers. He became prefect under the First French Empire, then a member of the general counsel of Haute-Garonne. He was notably Prefect of the Ardèche, Calvados and Aube.

On 24 February 1814, Napoléon issued an imperial order discharging him from his post as Prefect of l'Aube.

The quai Caffarelli and cours Caffarelli in Caen are named after him.

He wrote an "Abrégé des Géoponiques" (summary of the Geoponica attributed to Cassianus Bassus), Paris, 1812.

== Sources ==
- Dictionnaire Bouillet
