= Louis-Marie-Joseph Maximilian Caffarelli du Falga =

French Army officer and scholar

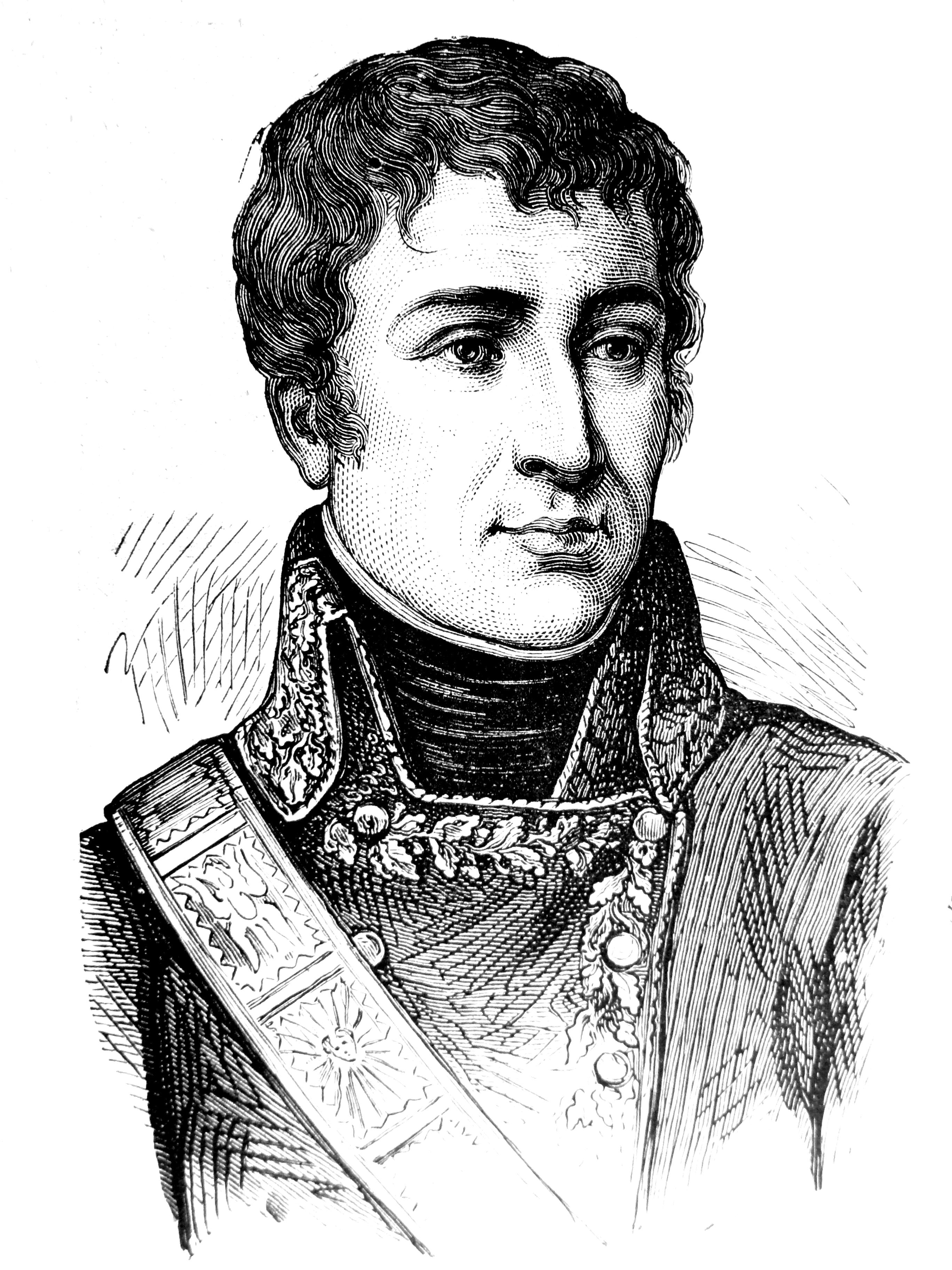
- Born: 13 February 1756; Falga, France
- Died: 27 April 1799 (aged 43); Acre, Sidon Eyalet
- Military career
- Allegiance: Kingdom of France; French First Republic
- Branch: French Royal Army; French Revolutionary Army
- Rank: Brigadier-General

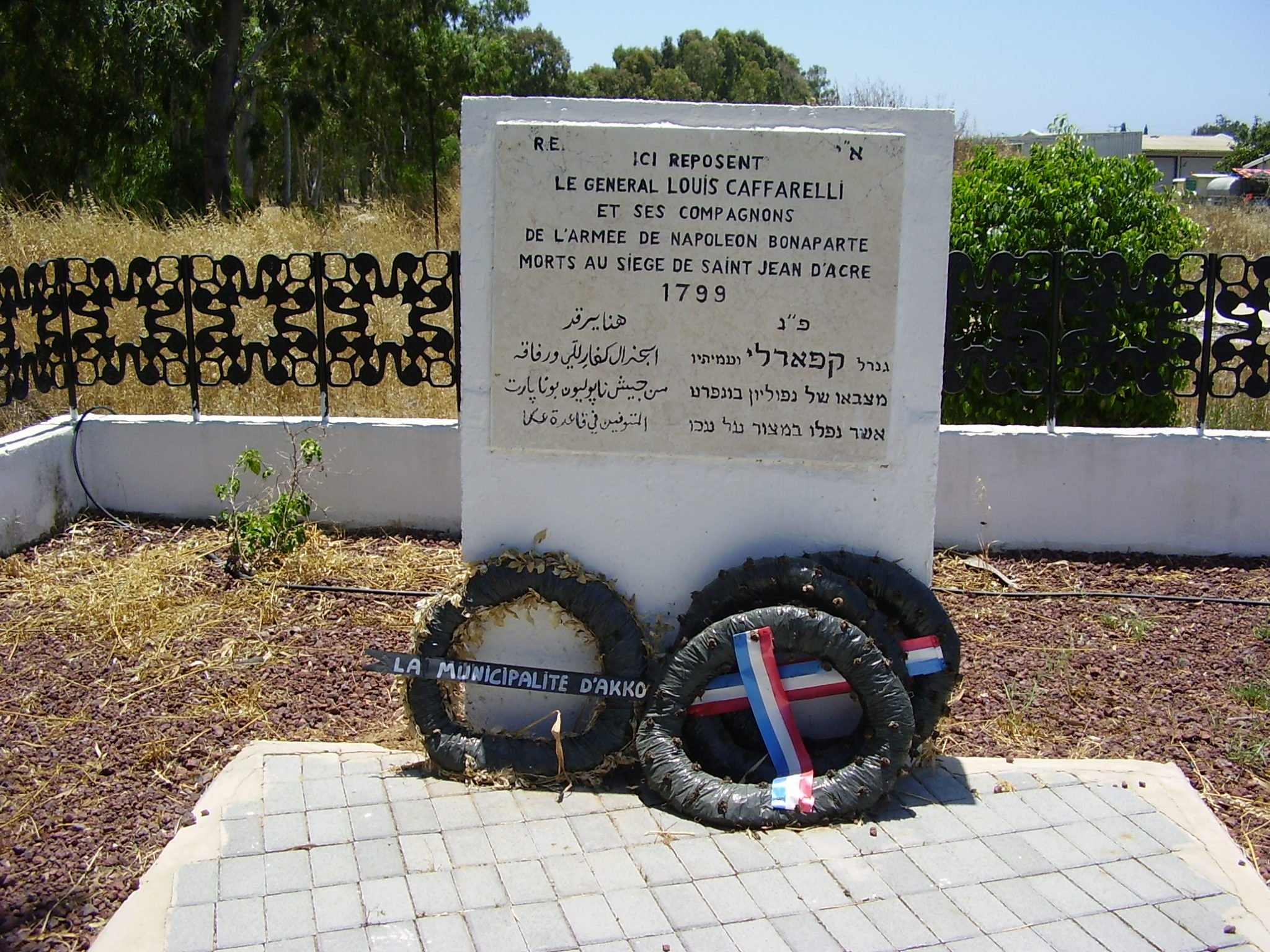
Caffarelli's tomb in Acre, Israel

Brigadier-General Louis-Marie-Joseph Maximilian Caffarelli du Falga (13 February 1756 – 27 April 1799) was a French Army officer, engineer, and scholar. His younger brothers Marie-François Auguste de Caffarelli du Falga (1766–1849) and Louis-Marie Joseph Caffarelli (1760–1845) were also generals.

== Life ==
The oldest of ten children, he refused to exercise the right of the firstborn son to the majority of his parents' wealth. He served under Jean Baptiste Kléber in the Army of Sambre and Meuse, losing his left leg to a cannonball on 17 December 1795 and was promoted to brigadier general on the same day. He continued serving in the French army with a wooden leg and joined Kléber in participating in the French invasion of Egypt and Syria.

Accompanying Napoleon, he was present when the French landed at Valletta to occupy Malta on 12 June 1798. Like the other French generals, he was impressed by its defences, saying to Napoleon, "Upon my word, General, it is lucky there is someone in the town to open the gates for us!" A saying arose about him among the French troops which invaded Egypt: "Caffa doesn't give a damn what happens; he's always sure to have one foot in France." He was elected a member of the Institut d'Égypte's political economy section, in the class of moral and political science, and formed part of the commission for drafting the institute's regulations. He also accompanied Napoleon on the surveys to trace the route of what later became the Suez Canal.

On 17 February 1799, Caffarelli began to oversee the construction of siege batteries and fortifications in preparation for an assault during the Siege of El Arish. His actions allowed the French to begin artillery fire the following day, and to successfully capture the fort from the Ottomans the day after that, ending an eleven-day siege.

He had to have his right arm amputated as well when his elbow was smashed by a bullet during an assault on Acre on 9 April 1799. He was just beginning to adapt by learning to write with his left hand when gangrene struck, causing a fever that killed him. Napoleon wrote of him in the order of the day: "Our universal regrets accompany General Caffarelli to the grave; the army is losing one of its bravest leaders, Egypt one of its legislators, France one of its best citizens, and science, an illustrious scholar." He was a character in Youssef Chahine's film Adieu Bonaparte.
