= Château de Trémazan =

Ruined castle in Finistère, France

Coordinates: 48°33′3″N 4°42′44″W

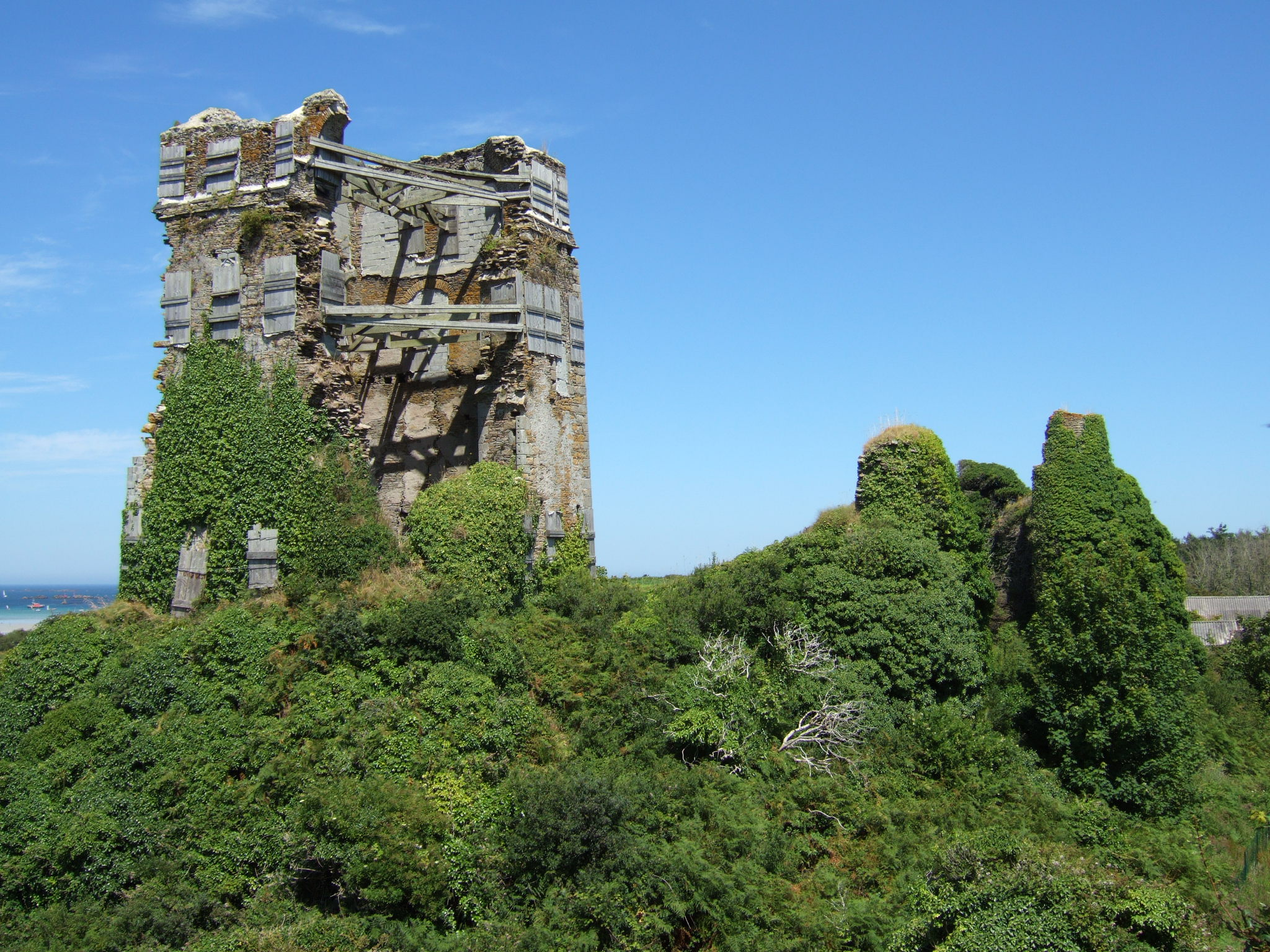
Ruins of the castle of Trémazan

The Château de Trémazan is a ruined castle in the commune of Landunvez in the Finistère département of France. It is located below the coastal road, hidden from the sea.

== Architecture ==
This medieval building, constructed on a rocky outcrop, has a square keep. A partial collapse during the winter of 1995 exposed the interior, revealing a habitable tower of four floors, each with one chamber.

== History ==
The history of Trémazan is intimately linked to that of the du Chastel (or Châtel) family, who built it and made it their principal residence for several centuries. The origins of this dynasty are uncertain, but they became very prominent, taking their place in the high Breton aristocracy and counted among the four most important families of the Viscounty of Léon. An old saying characterises Léon in these terms: "antiquité de Penhoët, vaillance du Chastel, richesse de Kermavan et chevalerie de Kergounadeac'h" ("the antiquity of Penhoët, the bravery of Chastel, the wealth of Kermavan and the chivalry of Kergounadeac'h"). However, by the end of the 16th century, the elder branch of the family died out for lack of a male heir.

The present castle dates mainly from the 13th and 14th centuries. The castle was built on the ruins of a castellum already existing in the 6th century. According to legend, Tanneguy du Chastel, founder of the abbey at Saint-Mathieu, was born here. The building became a stone castle around the 10th century. In 1220, it was destroyed during the war against the Duke of Brittany, then rebuilt thirty years later by Bernard du Châtel. Sold as national property after the French Revolution, the castle was abandoned in the 18th century. Apart from the 12th-century square keep, remains include towers and the outer enceinte dating from the 13th, 14th and 15th centuries.

== Preservation attempts: SOS Château de Trémazan ==
Today, the non-profit association S.O.S Château de Trémazan attempts to preserve the castle and to increase knowledge of its past. Samples from the castle beams were dated by dendrochronology. Pending funding for further restoration, the SOS Château de Trémazan association has attempted to finance temporary protection against potential structural collapses.

It has been listed as a monument historique by the French Ministry of Culture since 1926.

== See also ==
- List of castles in France
- Tour Tanguy

In French Wikipedia

- Famous member of the family: Tanneguy du Chastel

== Sources ==
- tremazan.lepla.com
