= Joseph Caffarelli =

French sailor, soldier and politician

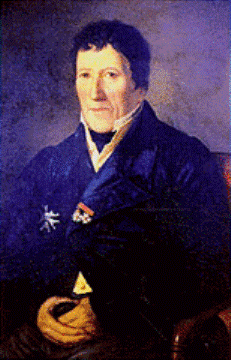
Joseph Caffarelli

Joseph Caffarelli, full name Louis Marie Joseph, comte de Caffarelli du Falga, (21 February 1760, Le Falga – 14 August 1845, Lavelanet) was a French sailor, soldier and politician, who was a Conseiller d'État and maritime prefect of Brest. His brothers Marie-François Auguste de Caffarelli du Falga and Louis-Marie-Joseph Maximilian Caffarelli du Falga were also active in the French military of the time.
