= Jim Sévellec =

French painter

Jim Sévellec(21 January 1897 – 21 May 1971), born Eugène Sévellec, was a French painter.

== Life ==
Eugène Sévellec was born at Camaret-sur-Mer. He grew up in an artistic colony around Symbolist poet Saint-Pol-Roux and drew the life of the port whilst very young. Under the influence of the Saint-Pol-Roux, he left for Paris to train under painter Louis-Marie Désiré-Lucas. From 1916 he was mobilised in the infantry and served among others as an interpreter for American and Scottish troops. From 1928 he collaborated with the Henriot factory, a faïencerie de Quimper.

In 1936 he was made peintre de la Marine.

He also created dioramas of Brest, France for the Musée de la Tour Tanguy.

He died at Brest, France.

== Works ==
- Brest: Son histoire et son rôle dans la vie de la Basse-Bretagne, Jim and Joël Sévellec, Brest, 1955
