= Marie-François Auguste de Caffarelli du Falga =

French general (1766–1849)

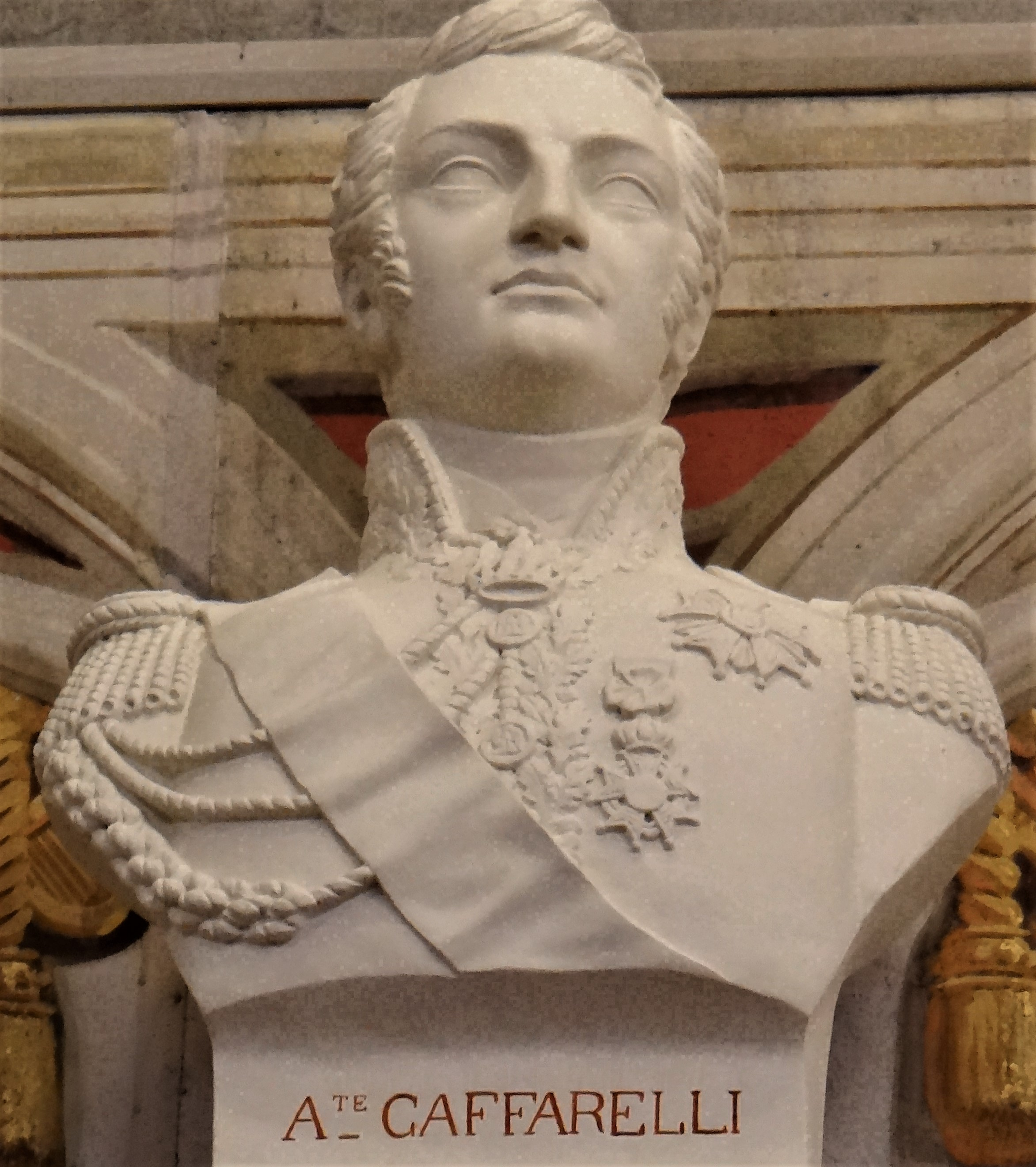
Auguste de Caffarelli

Marie-François Auguste de Caffarelli du Falga (French pronunciation: [maʁi fʁɑ̃swa oɡyst də kafaʁɛli dy falɡa]; 7 October 1766, Falga, Haute-Garonne, France – 23 January 1849, Leschelles, near Guise, Aisne) was a French général de division of Italian descent. Two of his brothers were also generals. His name is inscribed on the south side of the Arc de Triomphe.

== Life ==
First serving with the army on Sardinia from 1783, he returned to France in 1791, enrolling as a private dragoon in the 15e régiment and becoming aide-de-camp to General Dagobert. He was then made adjutant general to the Armée de Sambre-et-Meuse and commanded the light-infantry Demi-brigade, which was nicknamed l'incomparable.

Also serving on the French invasion of Egypt, he became aide-de-camp to Napoléon Bonaparte in 1800, général de brigade after the Battle of Marengo, and finally commander of the Légion d'honneur in 1804. Sent as an ambassador to Pope Pius VII, he organised the Pope's trip to France for Napoleon's coronation as emperor.

He was sent to interrogate Toussaint Louverture in his French prison cell at Fort de Joux and met with Toussaint several times, the first time on 15 September 1802. One of his duties was to find out about treasures that French authorities believed Toussaint had hidden in Saint-Domingue. Toussaint, in his memoir, disputes that he ever took any treasures, and indeed it seems as if Napoléon and his aide were absolutely wrong to assume that Toussaint had ever diverted any money. John Relly Beard writes that "It has been suggested that torture [of Toussaint Louverture] was employed by Bonaparte's aide, Caffarelli" although he states that he can find no evidence to support this claim. (Beard p. 342)

He became général de division and governor of the Tuileries, and grand aigle (Grand croix) of the Légion d'honneur, all on 8 February 1806, for his contribution to the victory at Austerlitz, and the following month was summoned to the Kingdom of Italy's ministry of war and the fleet (remaining at its head until 1810).

He was made a knight of the Order of the Iron Crown (ordre de la Couronne de fer) in 1807, comte de l'Empire (with a "dotation" of 23,000 francs on the "domaines" of Hanover), and was then employed in Spain. There he defeated an attempted English landing at Laredo, seized Bilbao, was named governor of Biscay in 1811, completely routed Mina's band of guerrillas and contributed to the raising of the siege of Burgos.

In 1813, he once again became Napoleon's aide-de-camp, and when the Emperor left his army, he entrusted Caffarelli with commanding the remaining troops in Paris, the government of the imperial palace and organising the guard for the empress Marie Louise. In 1814, he accompanied Marie-Louise and her son as far as Vienna. On his return to France, he begged to be allowed to retire, but Louis XVIII replied to his requests by sending him the insignia of the Order of Saint Louis and naming him military governor of the 13e division militaire.

In January 1815, the duc de Bourbon sent him to Rennes to do all the good and prevent all the evil that he could. On 22 April, he resumed his role as aide-de-camp, and on 2 June took command of the 1e division militaire.

He followed the army behind the Loire and was dismissed. Made a Pair de France in 1831, in 1840, he headed the legal commission looking into having Napoleon's mortal remains transferred back to France. Out of place in this era of grand political debates, General Caffarelli died in 1849 after a long illness, leaving a widow (daughter of comte Louis Charles d'Hervilly), two daughters and a son (who the French government summoned to join the conseil d'État for the prefecture of Ille-et-Vilaine).

== Sources ==
- "Marie François Auguste de Caffarelli du Falga", in Marie-Nicolas Bouillet et Alexis Chassang (dir.), Dictionnaire universel d'histoire et de géographie, 1878
- Mullié, Charles (1852). "Caffarelli (Marie-François-Auguste-Louis)" . Biographie des célébrités militaires des armées de terre et de mer de 1789 à 1850 (in French). Paris: Poignavant et Compagnie.
