= Tour Tanguy =

Medieval tower and museum in Brest, France

Coordinates: 48°23′00.36″N 4°29′50.46″W

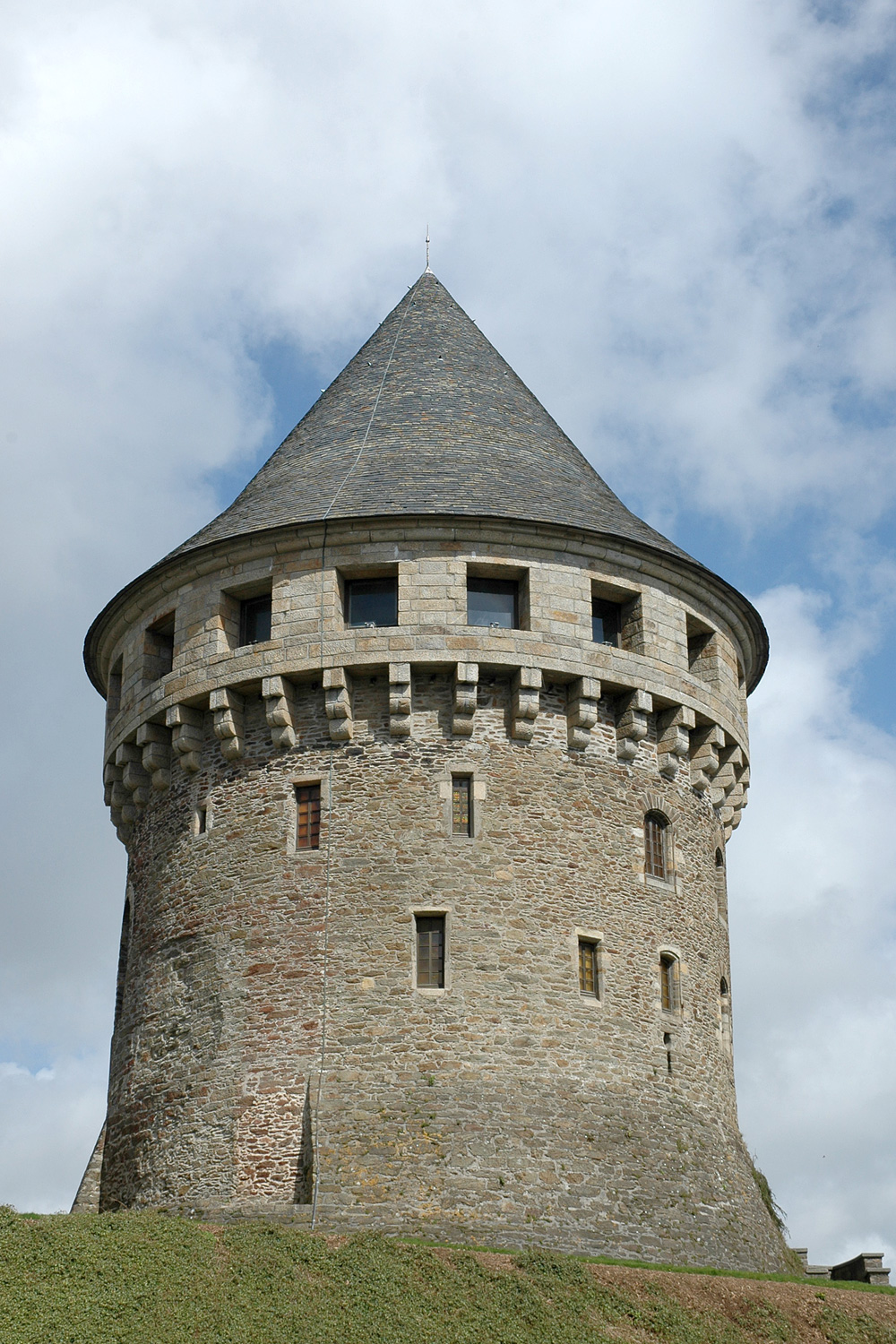
Tour Tanguy

The Tour Tanguy, Bastille de Quilbignon or Tour de la Motte Tanguy is a medieval tower on a rocky motte beside the Penfeld river in Brest, France. Probably built during the Breton War of Succession, it faces the château de Brest and is now accessed by a road off the square Pierre Péron, at one end of the pont de Recouvrance. It now houses the Museum of Old Brest, a museum with a collection of dioramas that depict the city of Brest on the eve of World War II.

== History ==
Probably built to protect or block crossings between the two banks of the river, the tower's origins cannot be precisely determined. It may have been built by the English during their occupation of the city in the 14th century, or earlier by lord Tanguy du Chastel, of the line of lords of Quilbignon which distinguished itself in battles against the English in Brittany and contributed to the development of the right bank. The name bastille de Quilbignon gives places to that of tour Tanguy, a forename held by members of this line. Their arms are engraved below the tower's gate. The family's powerbase was at the château de Trémazan at Landunvez.

Jean de Montfort handed it over to the English in 1341, but it was restored to his son John V, Duke of Brittany in 1397. Until about 1580, the tower was the seat of justice for the lords of Le Châtel, and it was neglected after that date, becoming the property of the Rohan-Guéméné family in 1786 before becoming a French royal possession and finally being sold to a Mr Gabon on the French Revolution.

In 1862, it was bought by the architect Barillé who turned it into his house, cutting windows and building on its top a sort of Chinese-style roof over a kiosk or pavilion. Its last occupant and private owner, doctor Joseph Thielmans, left it after it caught fire during the bombardment of 1944 (the bombing also destroyed the pavilion). It was acquired by the town of Brest on 15 July 1954 and summarily repaired, but its state worsened once more and its future was compromised by the redevelopment of the Recouvrance quarter. In 1959 the town finally charged the painter Jim Sévellec with evoking the town's past, of which few remains were left. The tower was restored and opened as the Museum of Old Brest on 25 July 1962. In 1971, a turret was added and the Neo Gothic cornice along the battlements replaced to restore the tower to its medieval shape.

== Museum ==
=== Ground floor ===
The ground floor houses old plans of the city of Brest, the penal colony, the Saint-Louis church and fortifications; a collection of the coats of arms of various Brest corporations (34 listed); old postcards and photographs.

=== 1st floor ===
On the first floor, Jim Sévellec has created dioramas of significant events and historical scenes of the city of Brest such as:

- "The Motte-Tanguy" tower
- "Marie de la Cordelière's last fight", a scene showing the battle of La Cordelière in 1512.
- "Le château de Brest": reconstruction of the château at the start of the 20th century.
- "The City at the beginning of the Seventeenth Century"
- "The Siam Embassy", reconstruction of the arrival in Brest of the three ambassadors of the King of Siam in 1686.
- "The city on the eve of the Revolution"

=== 2nd floor ===
On the second floor, dioramas by Jim Sévellec offer views of significant events, and a walk through the picturesque streets and squares of Brest in the past, including:

- "Tower market", market scene held at the foot of the tower twice a week.
- "Visit of their Imperial Majesties Napoleon III and Empress Eugénie to the port of Brest"
- "The Imperial Bridge", a representation of the Grand Rotating Bridge inaugurated on 23 June 1861, predecessor of the Recouvrance bridge, which linked the left bank and the right bank.
- "General view of Brest in 1961 – Rue de Siam"
- "The Pouliquen market", the place where this market was held, represented in 1910
- "Aviation Bar", located at the bottom of rue Kléber and rue Monge, 1934
- "The stairs of the fountain", 1930
- "Rue Borda", which slowly descended towards rue de la Porte, 1925

=== 3rd floor ===
The top floor is only accessible during certain events and exhibitions.

Panorama of the castle and the Tour Tanguy
