= Quimper faience =

Pottery style in Brittany, France

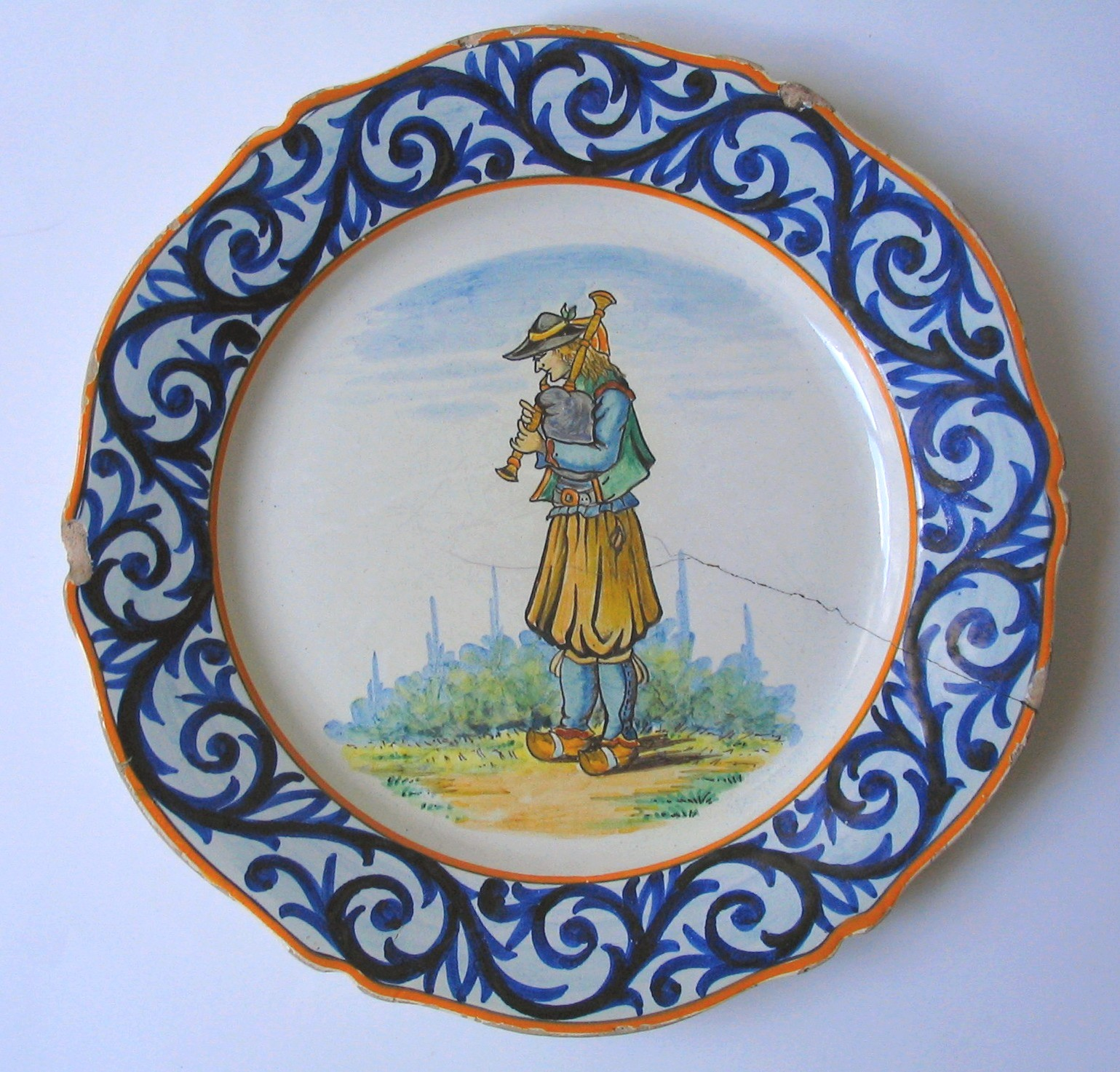
"Petit Breton" plate, Henriot, c1925

Quimper faience (French: la faïence de Quimper) is produced in a factory near Quimper, in Brittany, France. Faience operations were started by Jean-Baptiste Bousquet, a potter from Marseille, in 1690 and were carried on by his descendants. One descendant, Antoine de la Hubeaudière, left his name on the business: La Grande Maison HB (H for Hubaudiere and B for Bousquet). Other companies that produced Quimper faience in the late 18th century included Porquier-Beau and Jules Henriot, later known as Henriot Faïenceries. Henriot Faïenceries merged with HB in 1968 under the name Societe des Faïenceries de Quimper, but the entity failed in 1983. The faïencerie was reopened in 1984 by an American couple, Paul and Sarah Janssens, the long-time imports of Quimper.

The "Faïenceries de Quimper" were established in "Locmaria", the historical faience quarter of the city of Quimper, near the center. The Faïencerie d'Art Breton, newly created in 1994, was also established in Quimper, but outside the historical quarter "Locmaria". "Locmaria" now also houses a Quimper faience museum.

The pottery's design reflects a traditional Breton influence. One design, which became typical for Quimper faience, is the "petit breton", a naive representation of Breton man and/or woman in traditional Breton costume. The "petit breton" became popular around 1870 and is still today the main design bought by tourists. Older Quimper faience items are sought after by collectors worldwide.
