= Falga =

- Commune
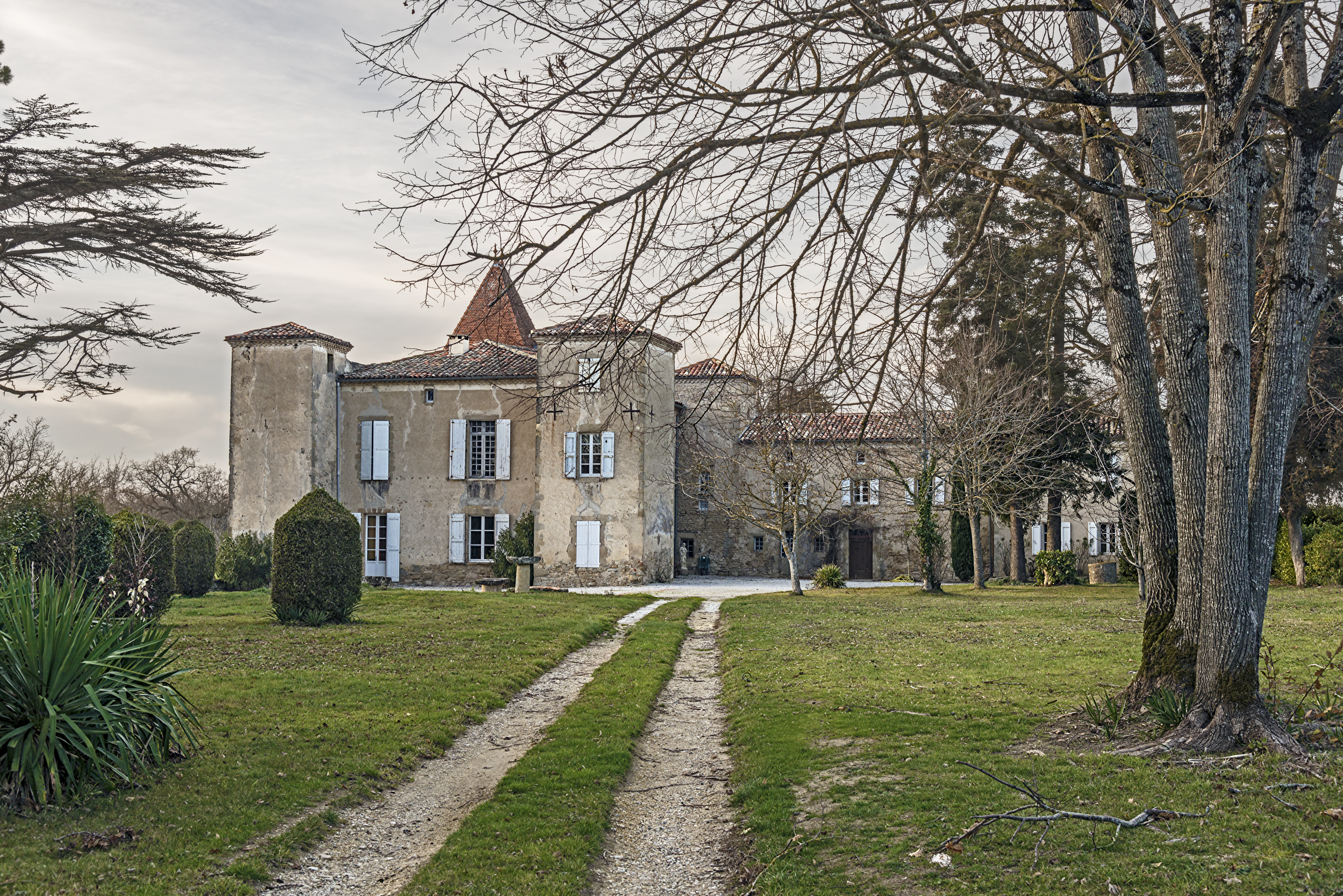
- The chateau in Falga

- Coat of arms
- Location of Falga
- Location within France Location within Occitanie
- Coordinates: 43°28′46″N 1°51′39″E
- Country: France
- Region: Occitania
- Department: Haute-Garonne
- Arrondissement: Toulouse
- Canton: Revel
- Intercommunality: CC aux sources du Canal du Midi

Government
  - Mayor (2023–2026): Helene Delmas
- Area^{1}: 5.38 km^{2} (2.08 sq mi)
- Elevation: 270 m (890 ft)
- Highest elevation: 286 m (938 ft)
- Lowest elevation: 209 m (686 ft)
- Population (2023): 141
  - Density: 26.2/km^{2} (67.9/sq mi)
- Time zone: UTC+01:00 (CET)
  - Summer (DST): UTC+02:00 (CEST)
- INSEE/Postal code: 31180 /31540
- ^{1} French Land Register data, which excludes lakes, ponds, glaciers > 1 km^{2} (0.386 sq mi or 247 acres) and river estuaries.

Falga (French pronunciation: [falɡa]; Occitan: Le Falgar) is a commune in the Haute-Garonne department in southwestern France.

== Population ==
Historical population
Year	Pop.	±% p.a.
1968	67	—
1975	57	−2.28%
1982	60	+0.74%
1990	73	+2.48%
1999	79	+0.88%
2007	99	+2.86%
2012	111	+2.31%
2017	124	+2.24%
2023	141	+2.16%
Source: INSEE

The inhabitants of the commune are known as Falgasiens and Falgasiennes

== See also ==
- Communes of the Haute-Garonne department
