= Fort-la-Latte =

Castle in Plévenon, France

Fort la Latte
- Castle of the Roche Goyon
- Plévenon in France
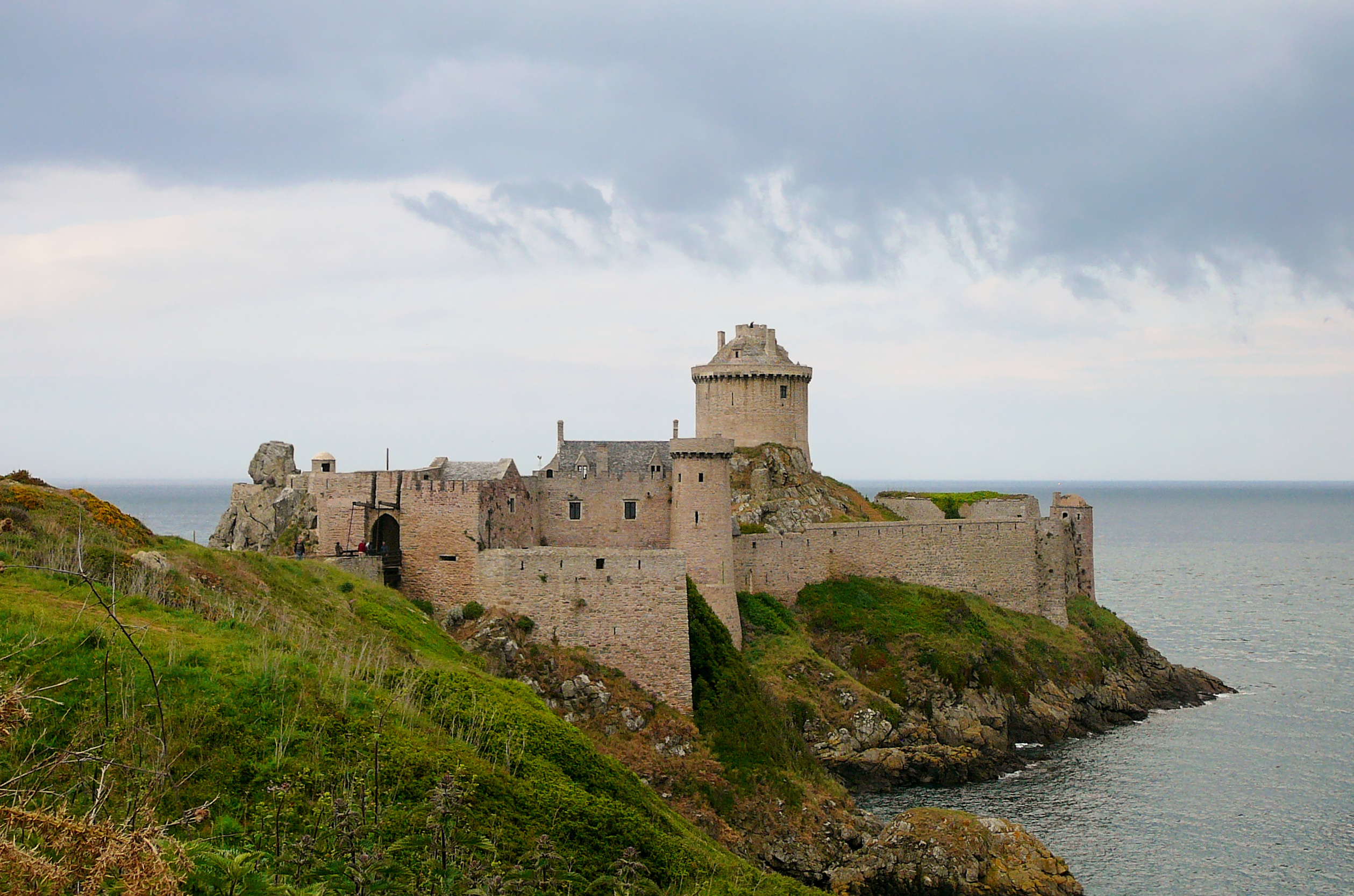
- Castle of the Roche Goyon

Site information
- Owner: Joüon Des Longrais

Location
- Location within France
- Coordinates: 48°40′06″N 2°17′05″W

Site history
- Built: 1340
- Built by: Siméon Garengeau

Garrison information
- Occupants: Étienne III Goyon

Aerial view

Fort la Latte, or the Castle of the Rock Goyon (French: La Roche-Goyon, Breton: Roc'h-Goueon), is a castle in the northeast of Brittany, about 4 kilometres (2.5 mi) southeast of Cap Fréhel and about 35 kilometres (22 mi) west of Saint-Malo, in the commune of Plévenon, Côtes-d'Armor.

It is a famous tourist attraction of the bay of Saint-Malo and the Emerald Coast (France) Côte d'Émeraude. This impressive castle was built on a small piece of land at the Bay of the Fresnay in the 14th century. Various films have been shot at this site, including The Vikings (1958) by Richard Fleischer with Kirk Douglas and Tony Curtis. It also features in the French band Manau's video for "La Tribu de Dana." A much larger, fictionalized version of the fort appears in the 2015 animated film April and the Extraordinary World.

== History ==
The castle was built in the 14th century by the Lord of Matignon, Etienne III Gouÿon (a patrilineal ancestor of the current Monegasque monarch). The castle's construction began in the 1340s and its dungeon dates from 1365–1370.

Following the return from exile of the Duke of Brittany Jean IV in 1379, the castle was besieged by Bertrand Du Guesclin. The castle was attacked and taken a second time during the Wars of Religion in the sixteenth century. After this defeat, the castle was abandoned. It was not until the 18th century, under Louis XIV, that the castle resumed its strategic interest and was fortified with defensive bastions.

It remained in service until the end of the First Empire when the evolution of military techniques led to its obsolescence. From 1892, it was sold to various private owners before being bought by the historian Frédéric Joüon Des Longrais in 1931 who, having a lifelong passion for archeology, undertook restoration which took over twenty years.

The castle of the Roche Goyon was classified as a monument historique by the French Ministry of Culture in 1925. Electricity finally arrived at the castle in 2001.

Albert II, Prince of Monaco made several private visits to the castle, in the footsteps of his ancestors the Goyon-Matignon.

== Location ==
The fort is located on a rocky cape, near Cap Fréhel, in the town of Plévenon.

This site was chosen because of its favorable location – being difficult for an enemy to attack due to the lack of easy access. The cliffs, on which it is built, gave excellent protection from any attempted invasion from the sea and provided warning of an approaching enemy; clear views of the English Channel, the Emerald Coast, and a large part of the Bay of St-Malo.

Construction materials were easily accessible with granite coming from the heart of Brittany, and sandstone directly recovered from the surrounding cliffs. There are traces of old quarries on the coast, whose connection to the castle is revealed by toponyms such as "Port Taillé" which can be found on the cadastre, and wood was plentiful from the many forests that existed nearby in medieval times.

The fort was an important strategic point since it was not far from the trade routes connecting Saint-Malo, Normandy, and the Channel Islands.

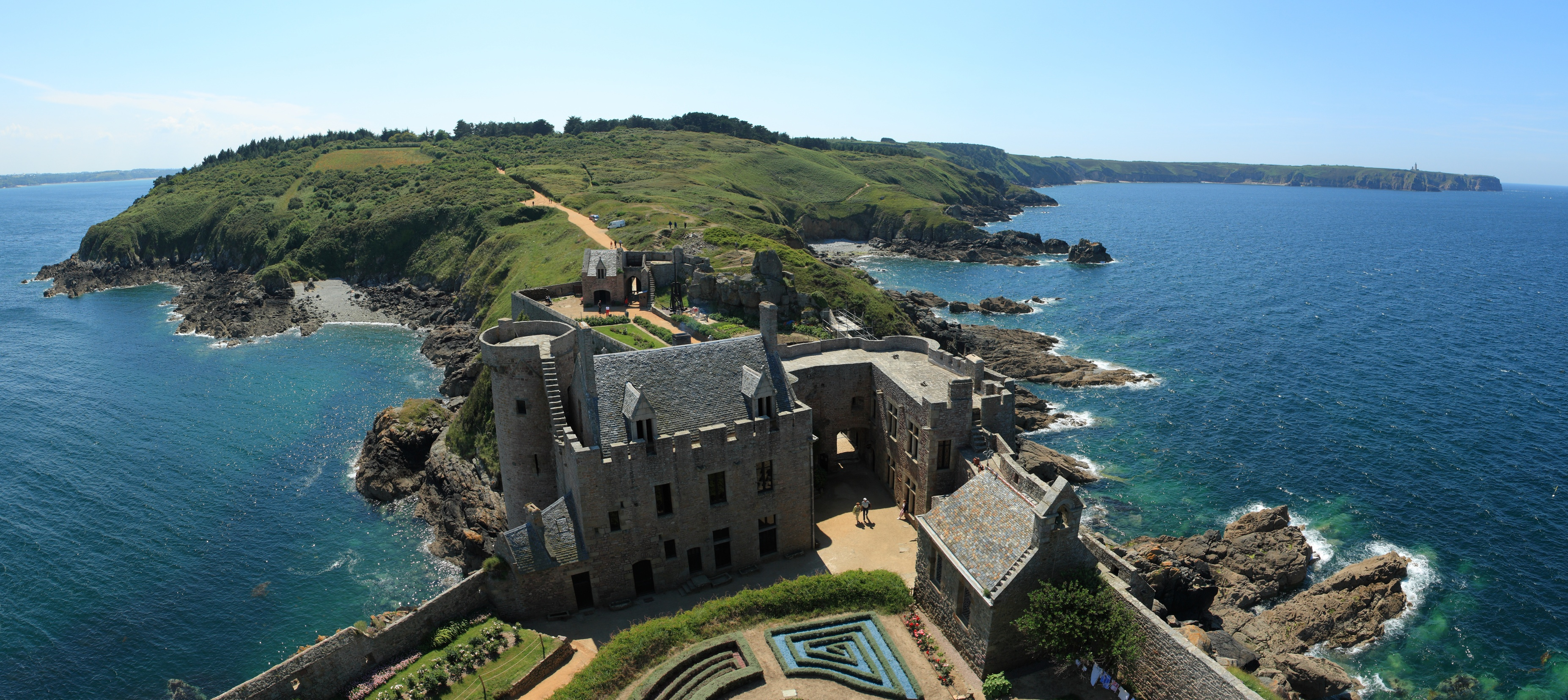
View over the green emerald coast, from the keep of Fort La Latte

== Festival ==
Since the castle opened to the public, the owners, the Joüon Des Longrais family have shared the area with visitors through various events:

- The Celtic nights of castle from 2006 to 2007 (storytelling evening with music)
- 'Les Médiévales du Fort La Latte' – a medieval festival organized in August every year since 2008, which includes mediaeval stallholders, jousting tournaments and falconry displays as well as a smaller medieval event every two years.

== Description ==
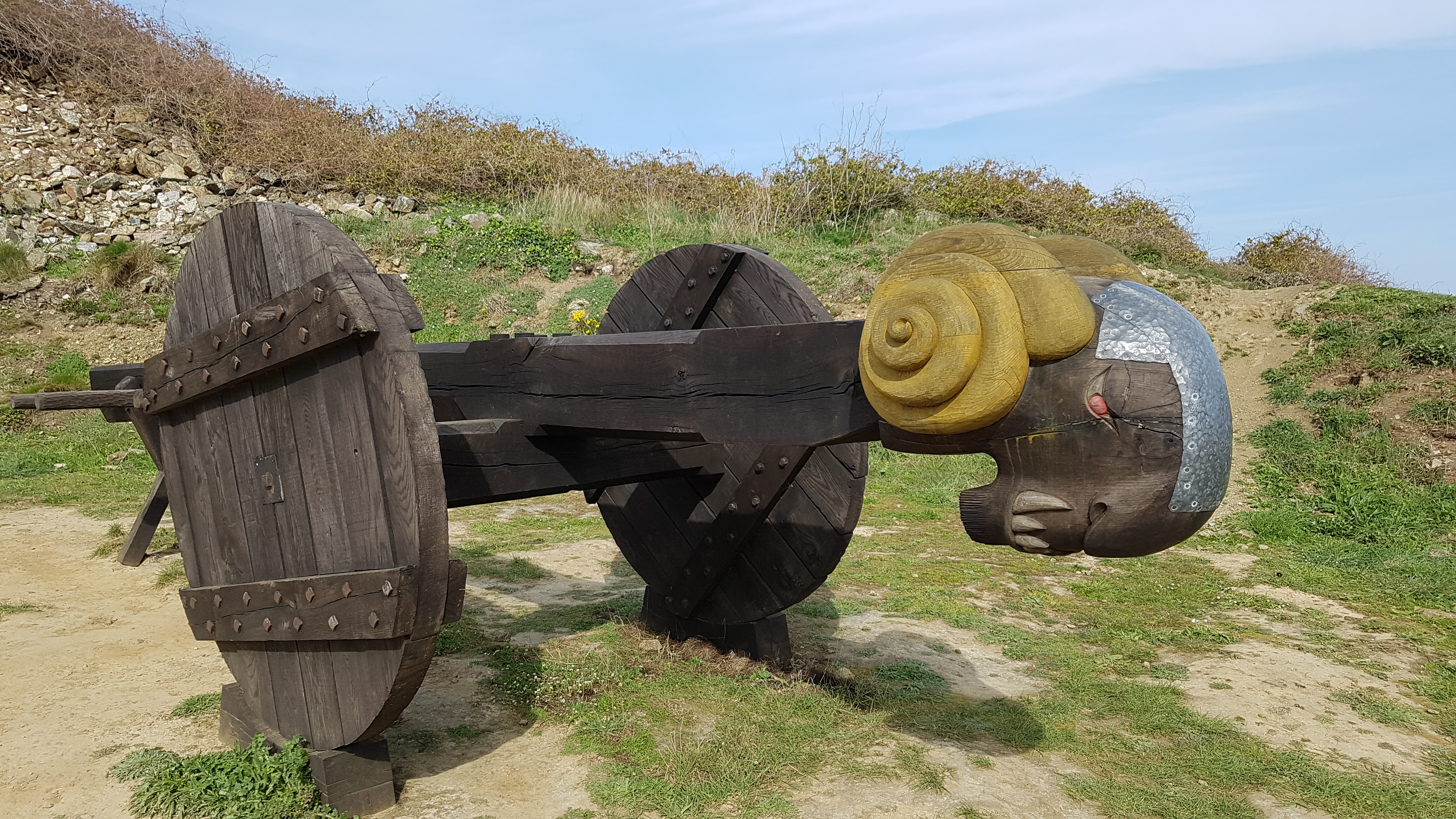
The battering ram in front of the first gatehouse

The castle has two gatehouses, one opening onto the barbican, the other onto the courtyard of the castle; each has its own drawbridge. In the courtyard, there is a water tank, a chapel, various defensive features and installations (in particular the locations of the gun batteries), and of course the dungeon.

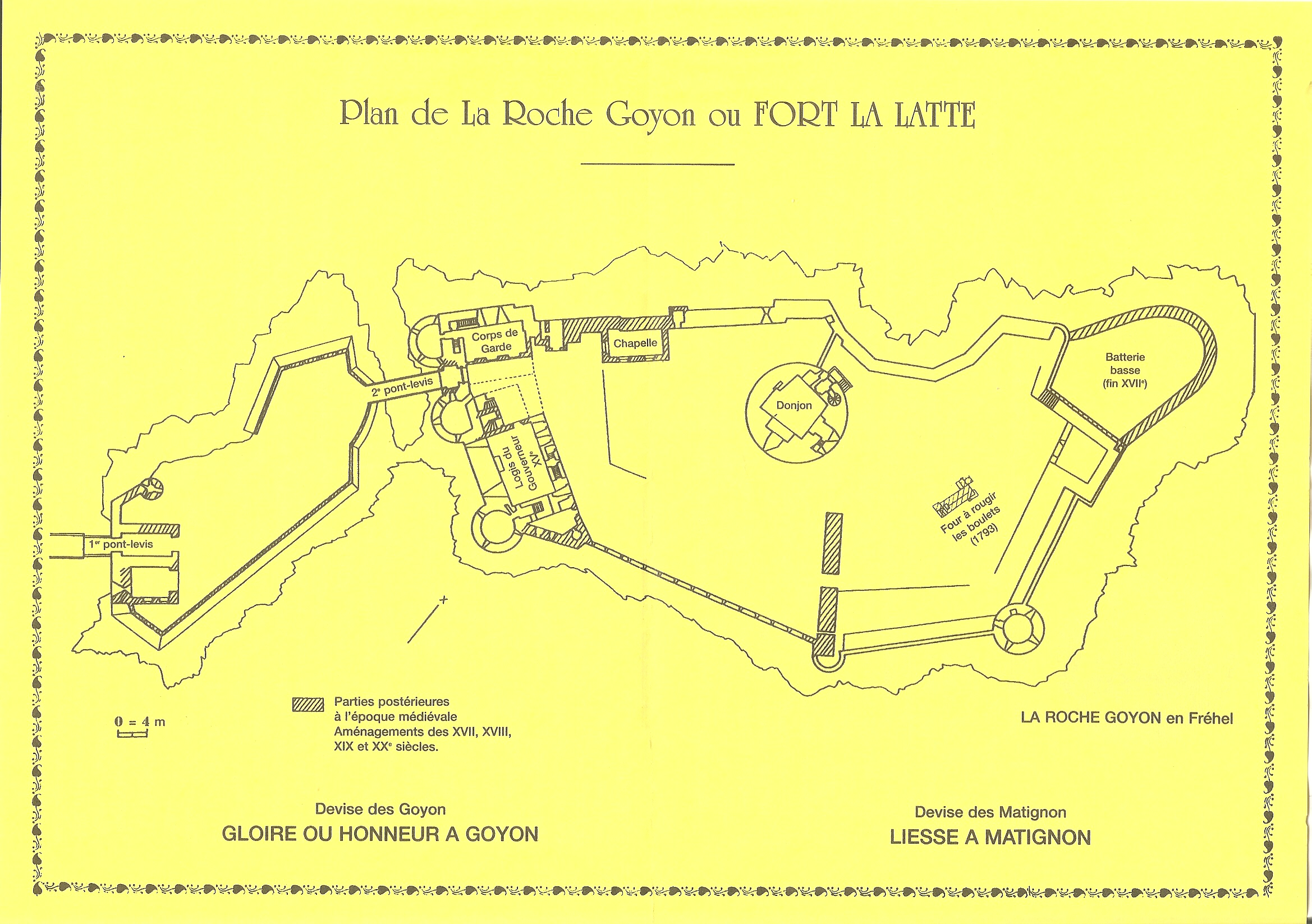
Map of the fort-la-Latte

On the way to the castle, there is a small menhir which, according to legend, is "the tooth" or "the finger" of Gargantua.

View of the Emerald Coast and Cap Fréhel from the keep of Fort La Latte.

=== Barbican ===
A banner of arms of the House of Goyon de Matignon, sometimes flown atop the first gatehouse.

The Barbican is protected by a portcullis and stout wooden door. The first gatehouse of the barbican has a drawbridge which has been restored to working order. At the time of its construction in the fourteenth century, it was also protected by a portcullis and a double-leaf door. Destroyed by cannon shot during the second capture of the castle, it was subsequently rebuilt.

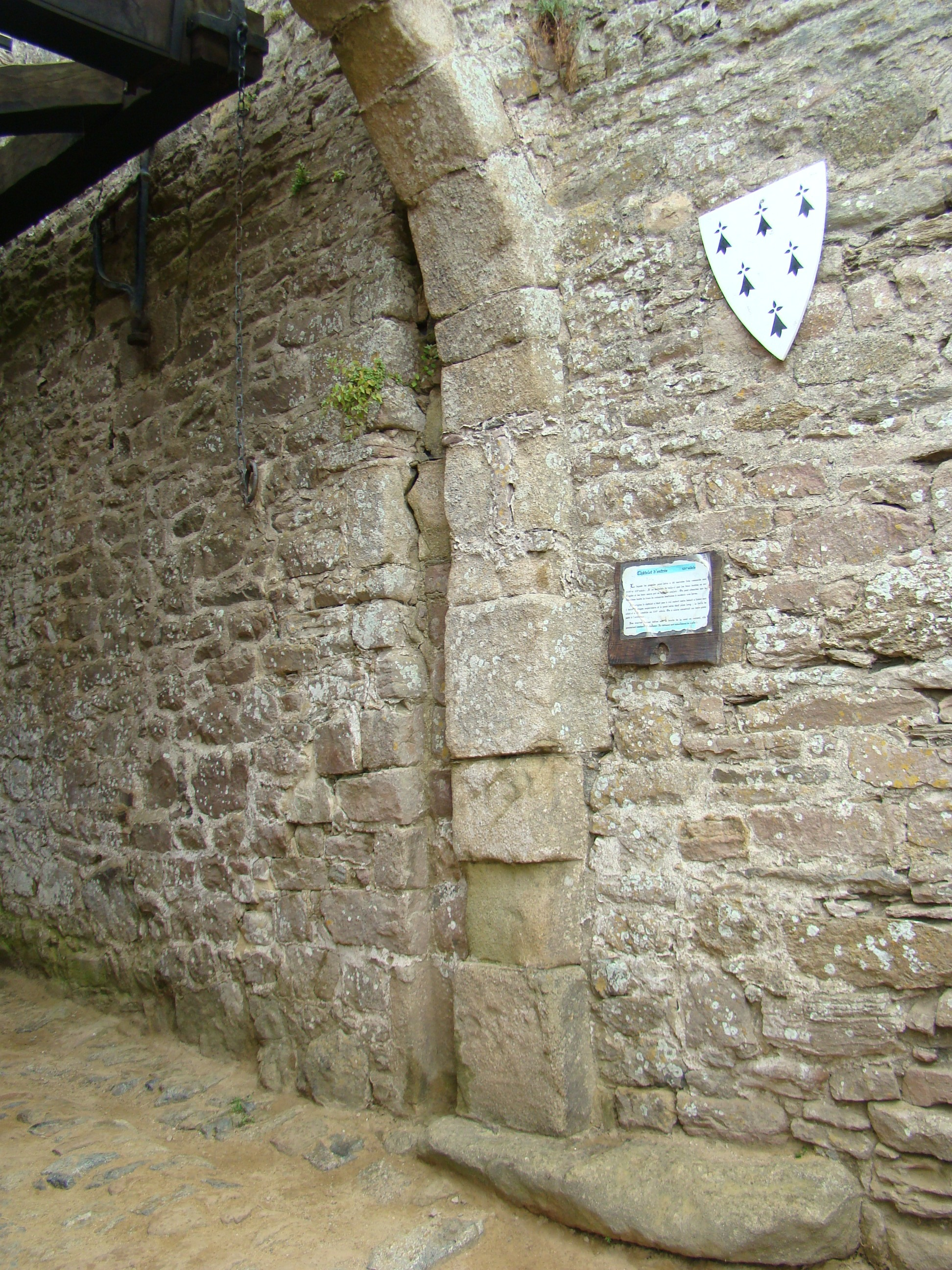
Entrance of the first gatehouse

In front of this first gatehouse a battering ram and a pillory can be found. Within the barbican is a small medieval garden, a "Bricole" (a kind of catapult) and one gains a panoramic view of the bay of St Malo.

=== The courtyard ===
The courtyard contains several installations, such as the water cistern, the chapel (built during Louis XIV's reign), the governor's house, and the dungeon. Completely backfilled in the 17th century so that cannons may be used, the original medieval soil is up to eight meters below the modern-day surface. Archaeological excavations have revealed a square tower that probably served as a watchtower which has been entirely buried underground. A second building protects the courtyard under which a dungeon can be found. This building is also protected by a drawbridge and portcullis. Only the two medieval towers remain as the rest (in particular the upper floor) were destroyed by cannons in the sixteenth century. The drawbridges of the two gatehouses are not on the same axis to hinder the manoeuvering of battering rams.

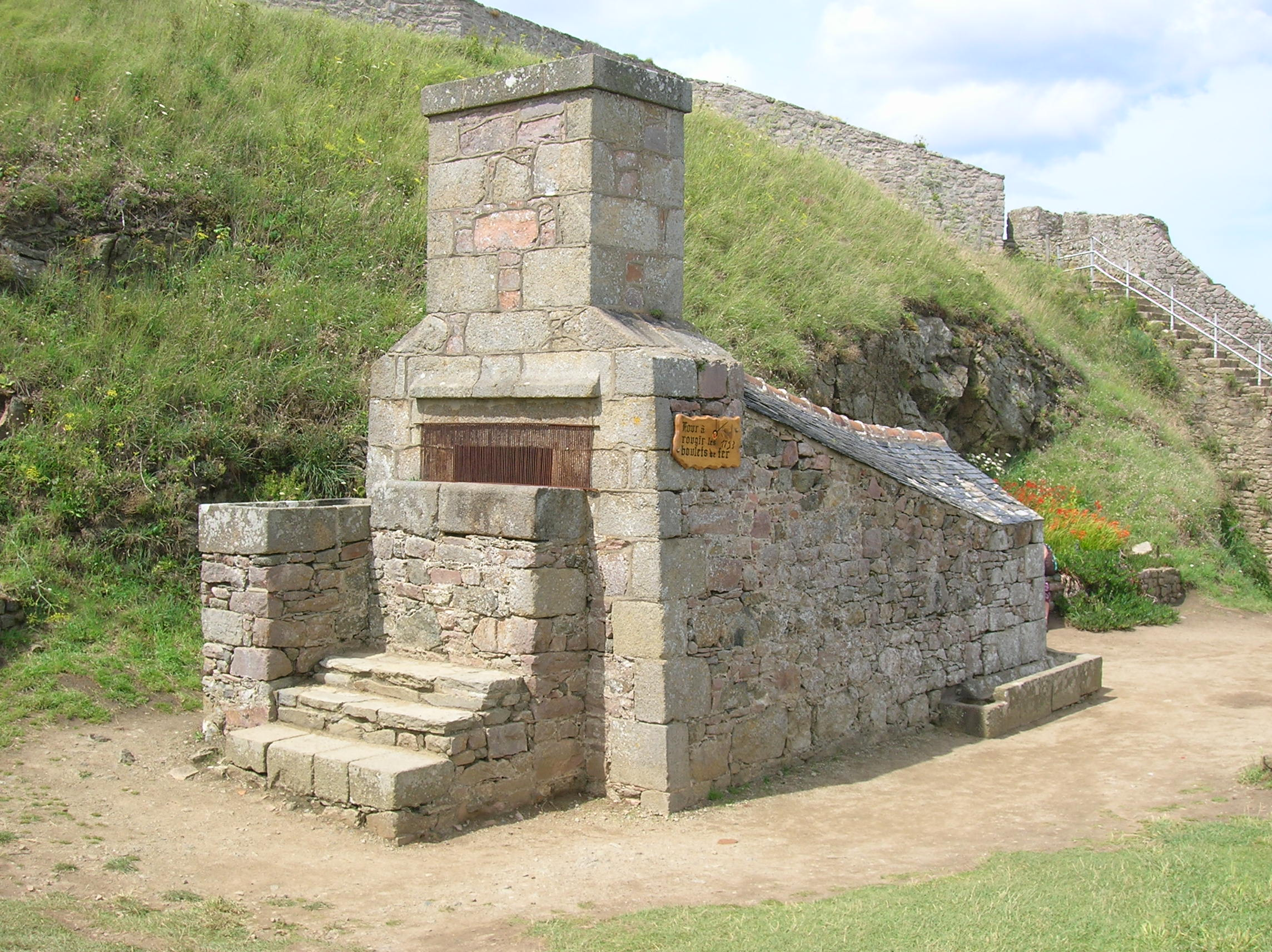
the oven to blush the balls

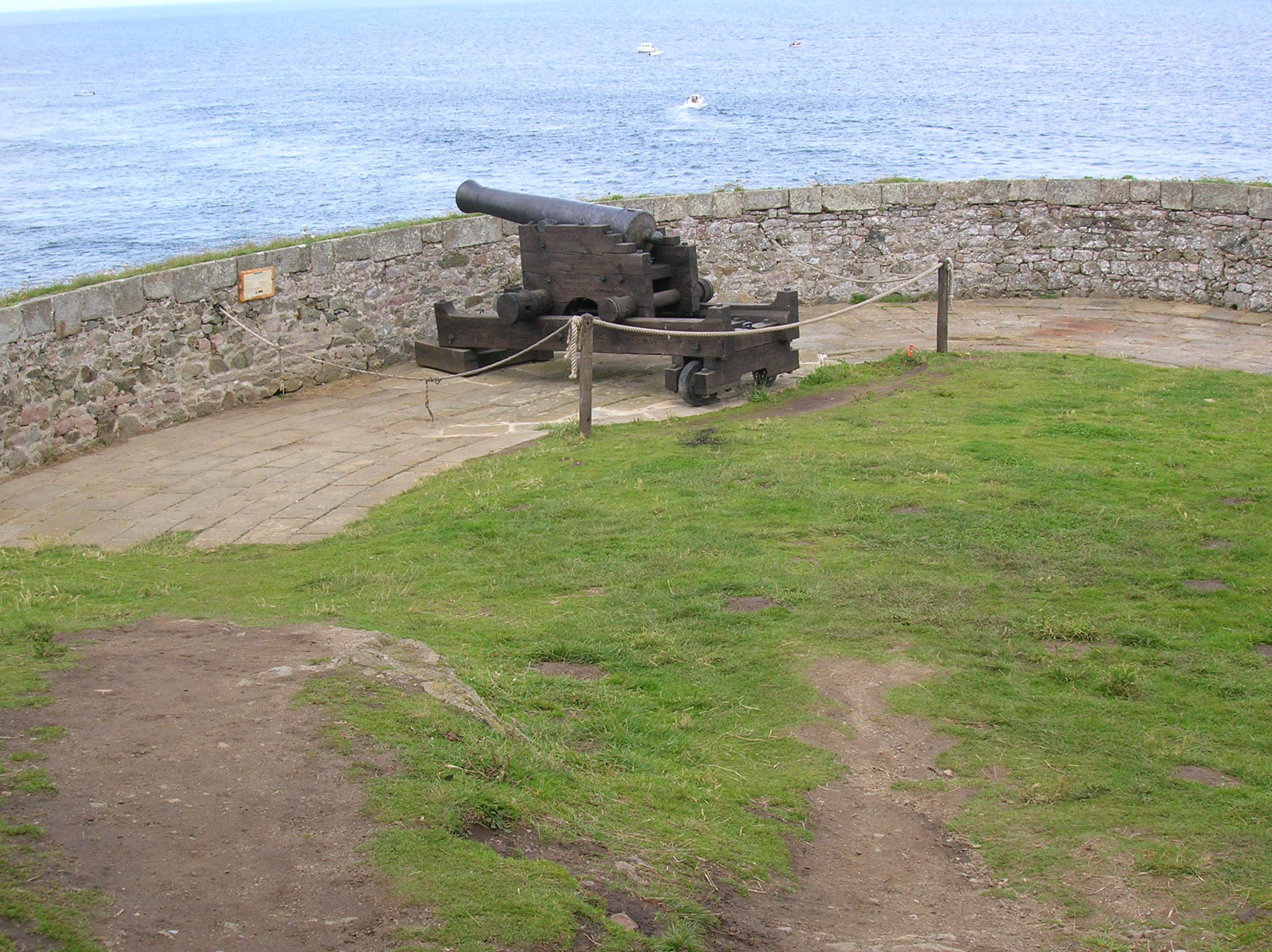
a cannon

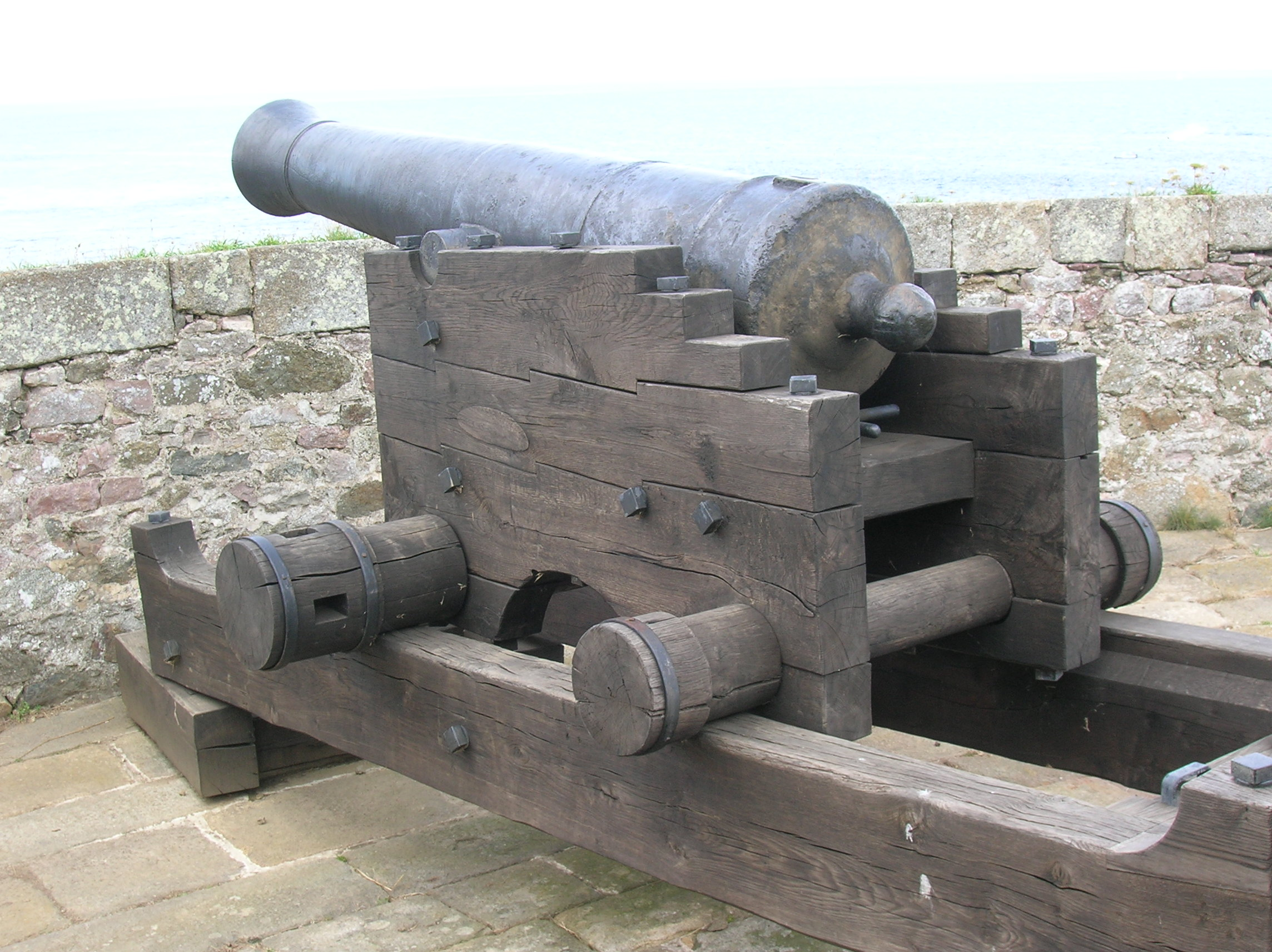
a cannon

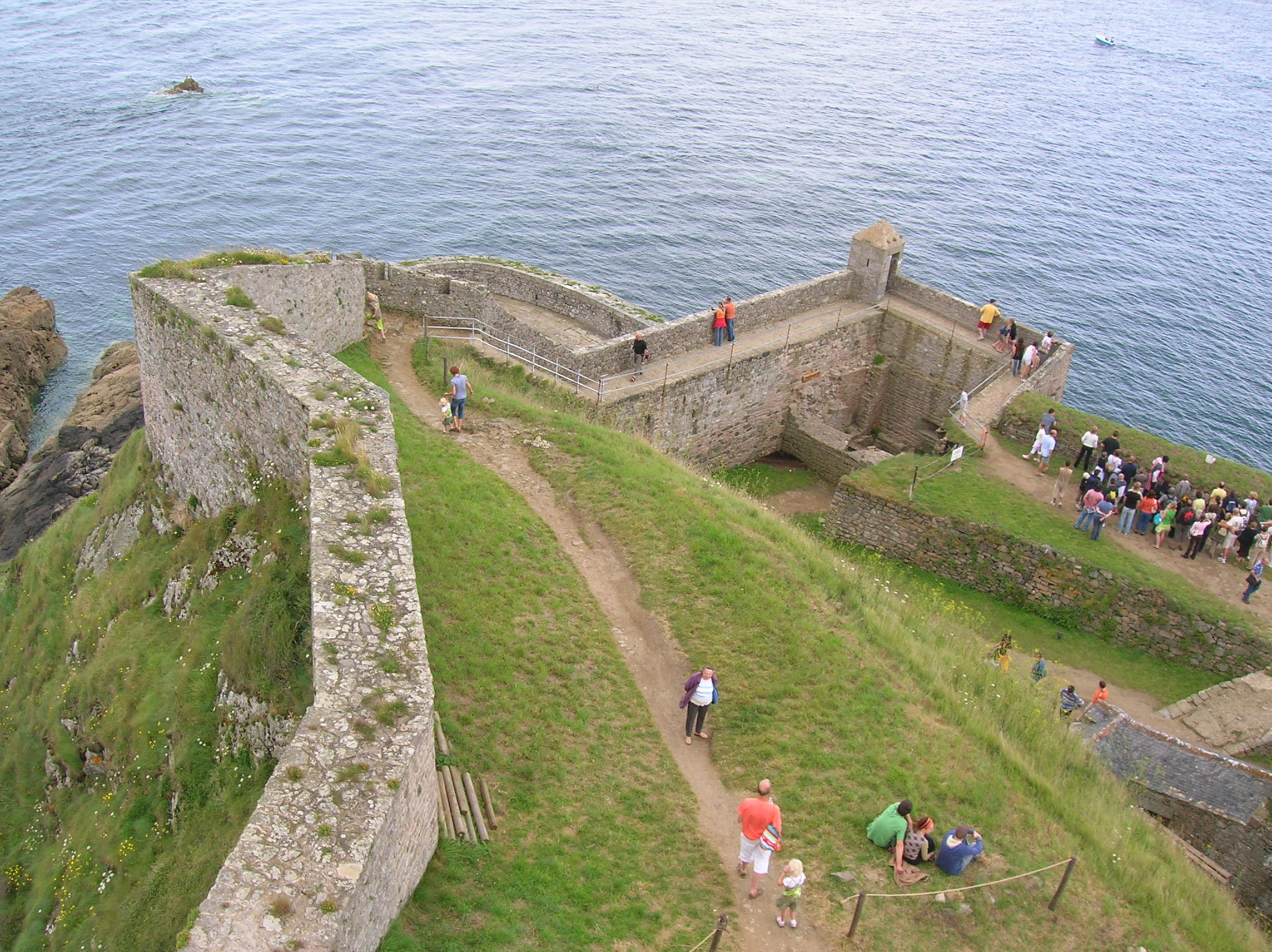
Exterior view

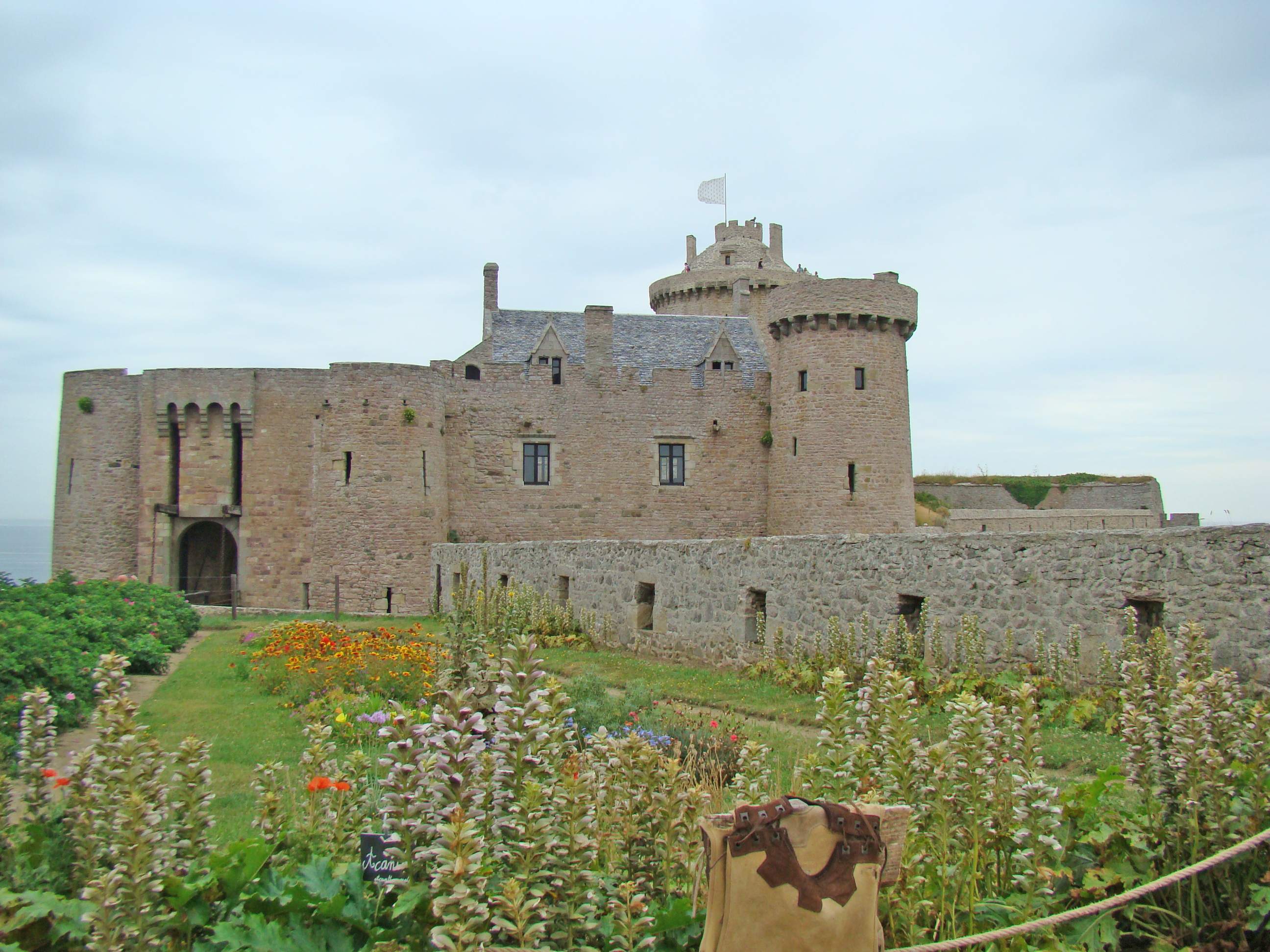
Interior courtyard of Barbican

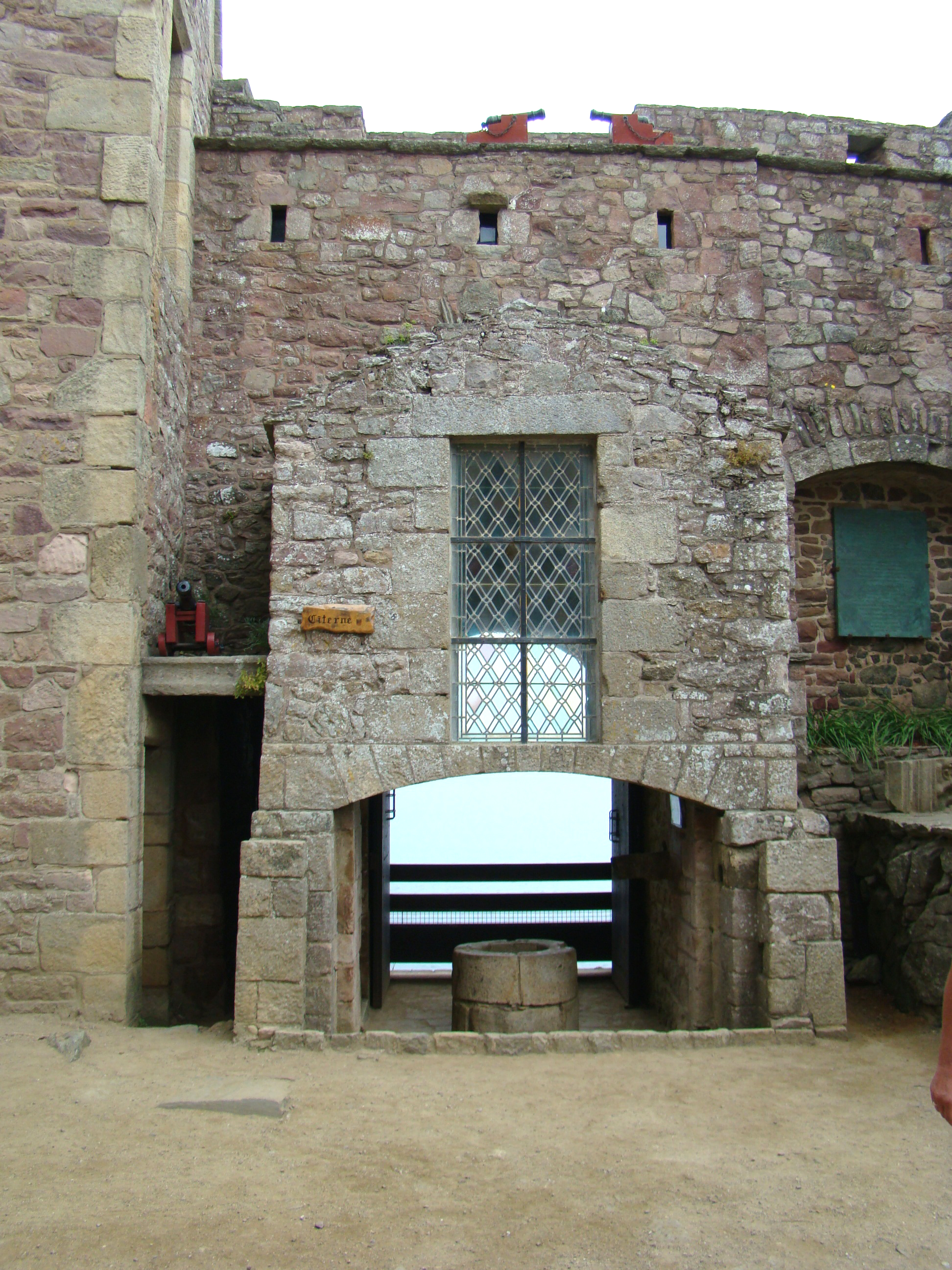
The cistern

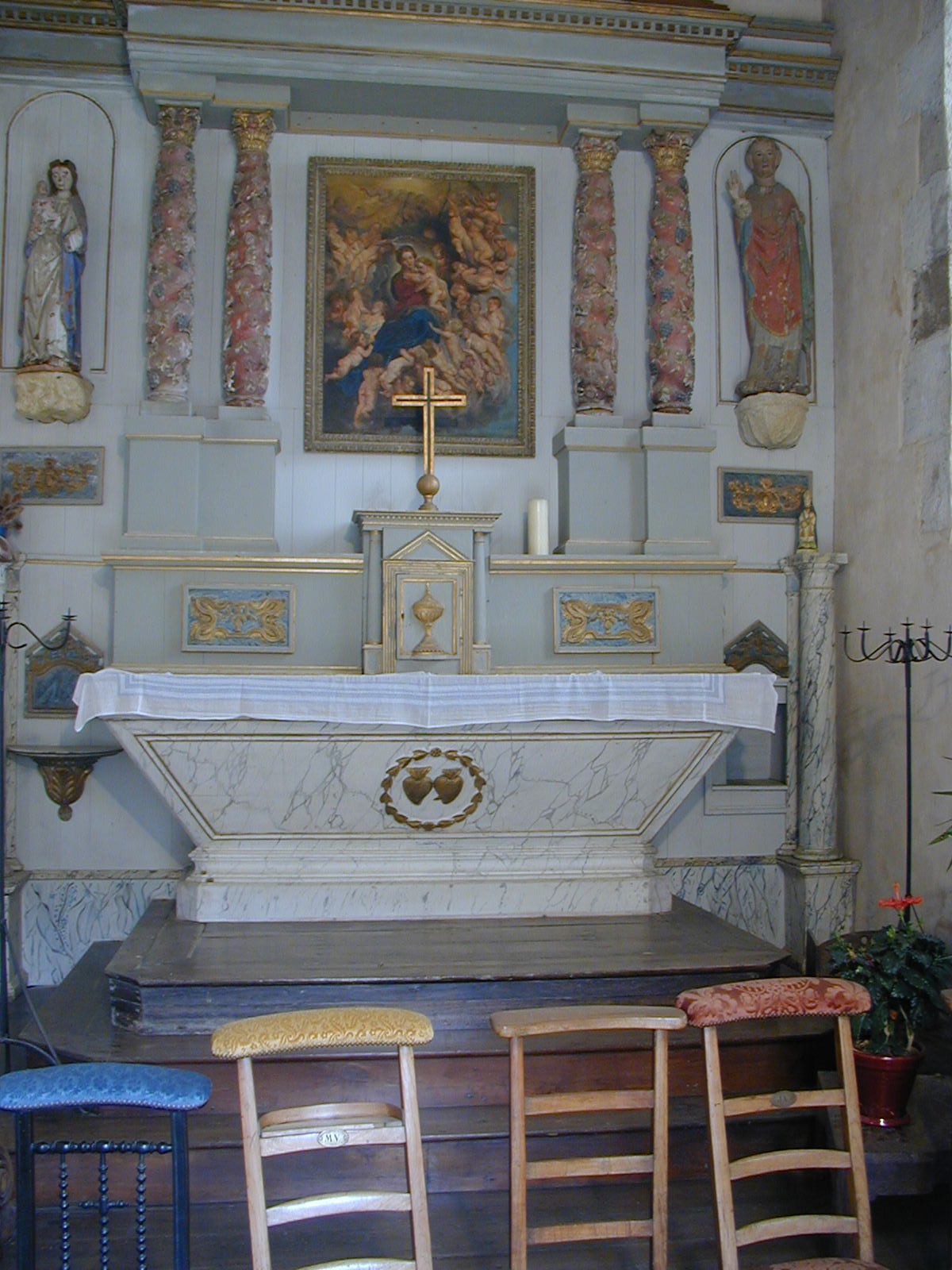
Interior of the chapel.

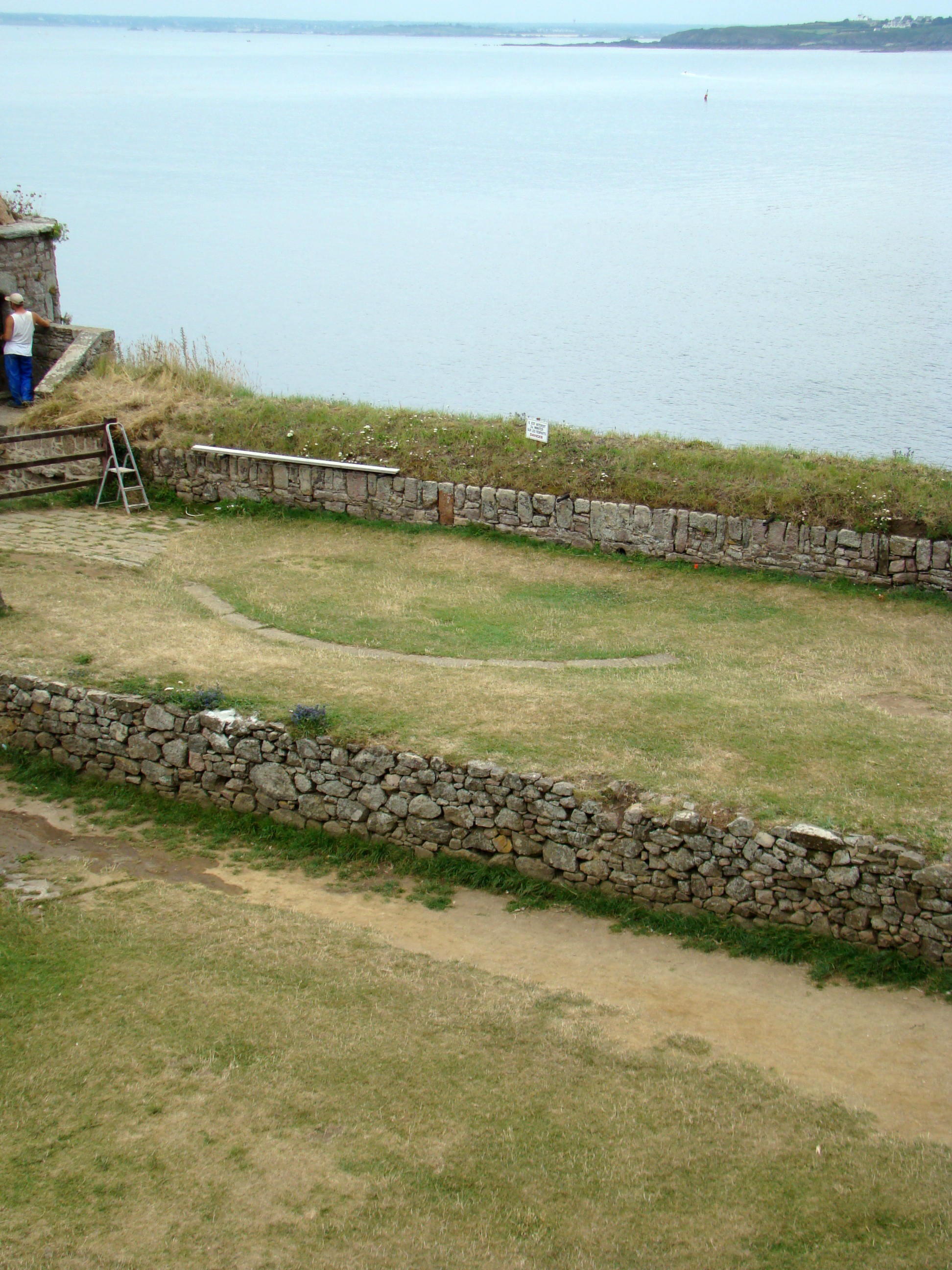
Path of the rolling.

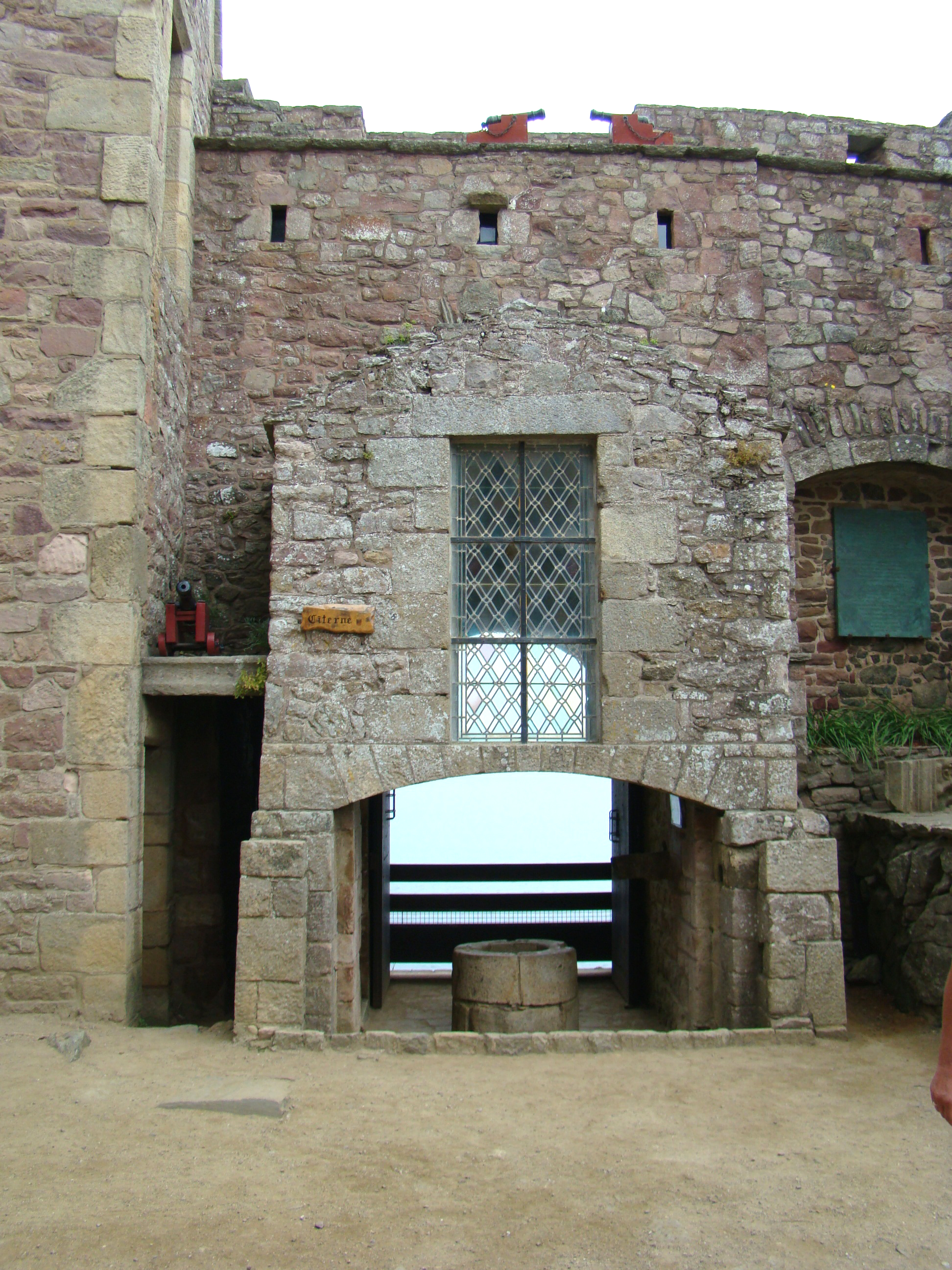
The cistern.

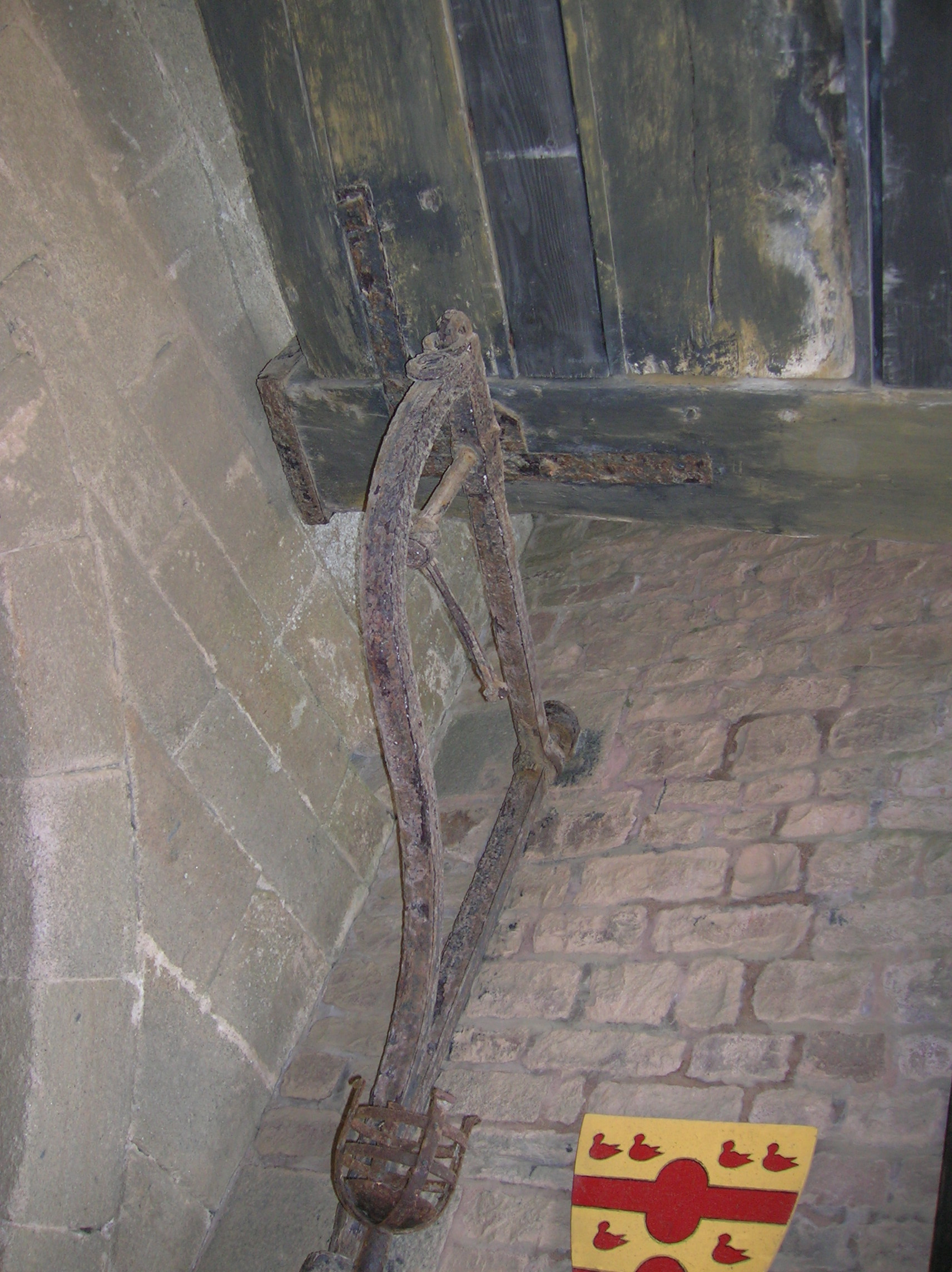
Drawbridge blocking system

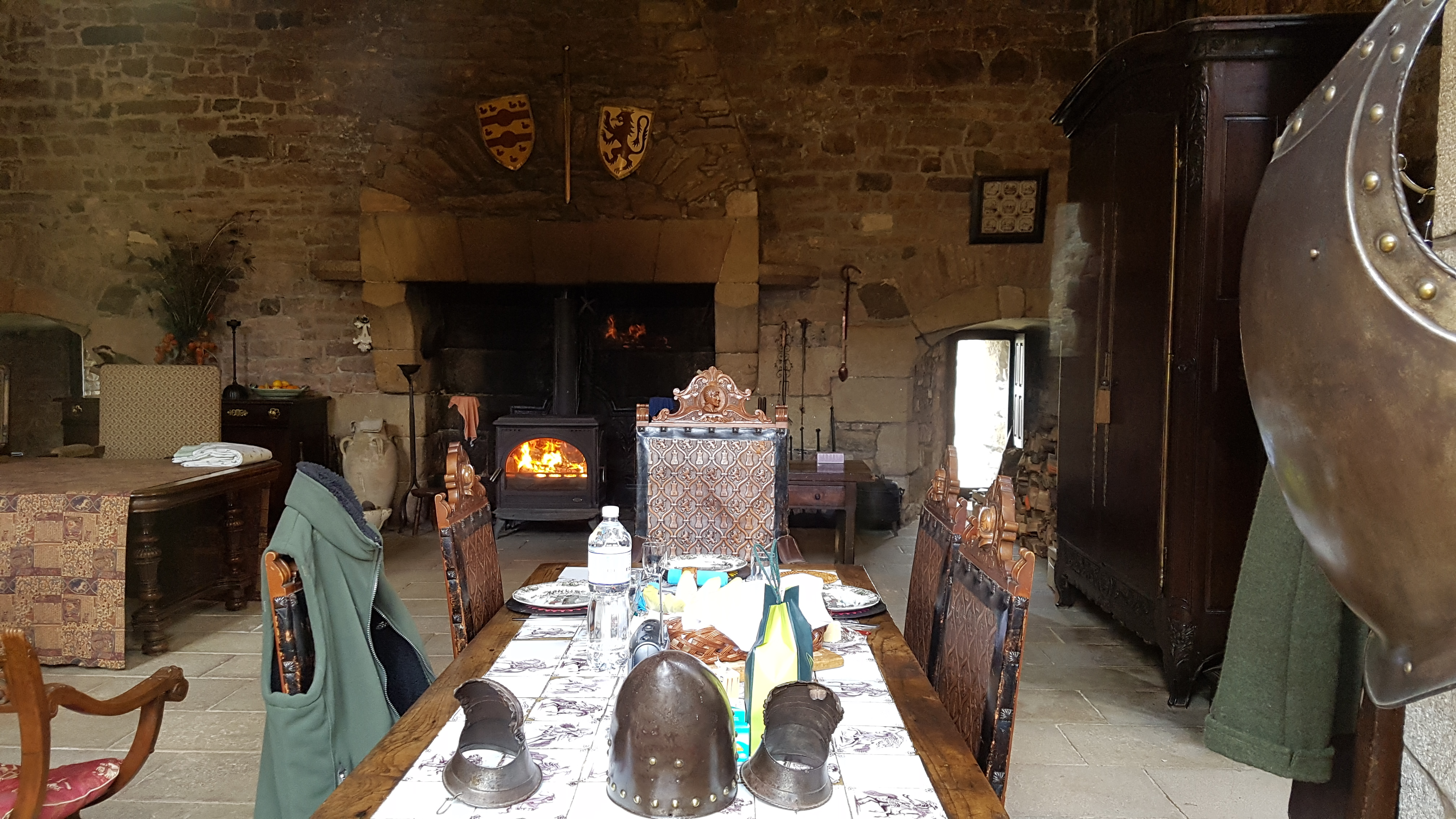
Interior of the stately home

==== The cistern ====
The water cistern, with a capacity of 20,000 L, was expected to have been sufficient to serve the entire garrison (about forty men) although given the maximum retention, the volume seems limited. A rainwater recovery system was also put in place. On the same level of the tank, a dummy drawbridge was intended to deceive any maritime attackers who would be deceived into sailing onwards an area of strong currents where their ship would then be at risk of smashing against the rocks. This dummy drawbridge was, however, ineffective.

==== The cannons ====
Eight cannons were installed during the reign of Louis XIV, the largest being eight meters long. Today, only "medium" copies are present on the site, but they could still shoot a ball up to a kilometer. Ballistic adjustments were made by use of the runway – a granite circle on which the cannon was placed and guided the wheels of the gun as it was maneuvered into position.

According to military records, one shot could be fired every three minutes.

==== Oven to 'Blush' the balls ====
The Chateau of the Roche Goyon also has a ball oven for heating cannonballs so that they were 'red-hot' before firing. The oven and method were rarely used, however, for several reasons:

- The oven consumed a lot of wood;
- for this to be effective, it had to heat for eight hours, which gave the enemies plenty of time to flee;
- loading the cannon proved much more dangerous as the hot ball could cause to pre-ignite the black powder before the cannon could be properly fired.

The use of ball ovens resulted in the coining of the expression "Tirer à boulets rouges" ("To shoot with red balls") meaning a particularly vehement attack on, or criticism of, an opponent.

==== The keep ====
Flag of the Duchy of Brittany, usually flown from the top of the keep.

The keep is equipped with machicolations and several types of loopholes: the crossbowmen in the shape of a cross for crossbow shooting and the very long single slit archeries for archery. Smaller holes are located on each side of the loopholes for shooting arquebus and larger holes through which bombard could be fired. A line of bombardment is visible at the level of these loopholes and corresponds to the capture of the castle in the sixteenth century which was accompanied by a cannonade from the keep.

Four sculptures representing the tetramorph according to Ezekiel are found at the level of the yellow granite circle which surrounds the keep. Here, facing the castle, can be found the angel of Saint Matthew, then the lion of Saint Mark, the eagle of Saint John (severely eroded), and finally the bull of Saint Luke to the right of the entrance to the dungeon.

The entrance to the keep reveals the presence of a third drawbridge, now replaced by a staircase. The emblem of the Goyon-Matignon family, a siren, crowns the passage. The entrance to the keep was protected by a portcullis and a defensive entrapment perhaps best described as a kind of 'mousetrap'. In the keep there is an exhibition on the restoration works of the castle and the roof is supported by a cross vault of ogives dating from 1340.

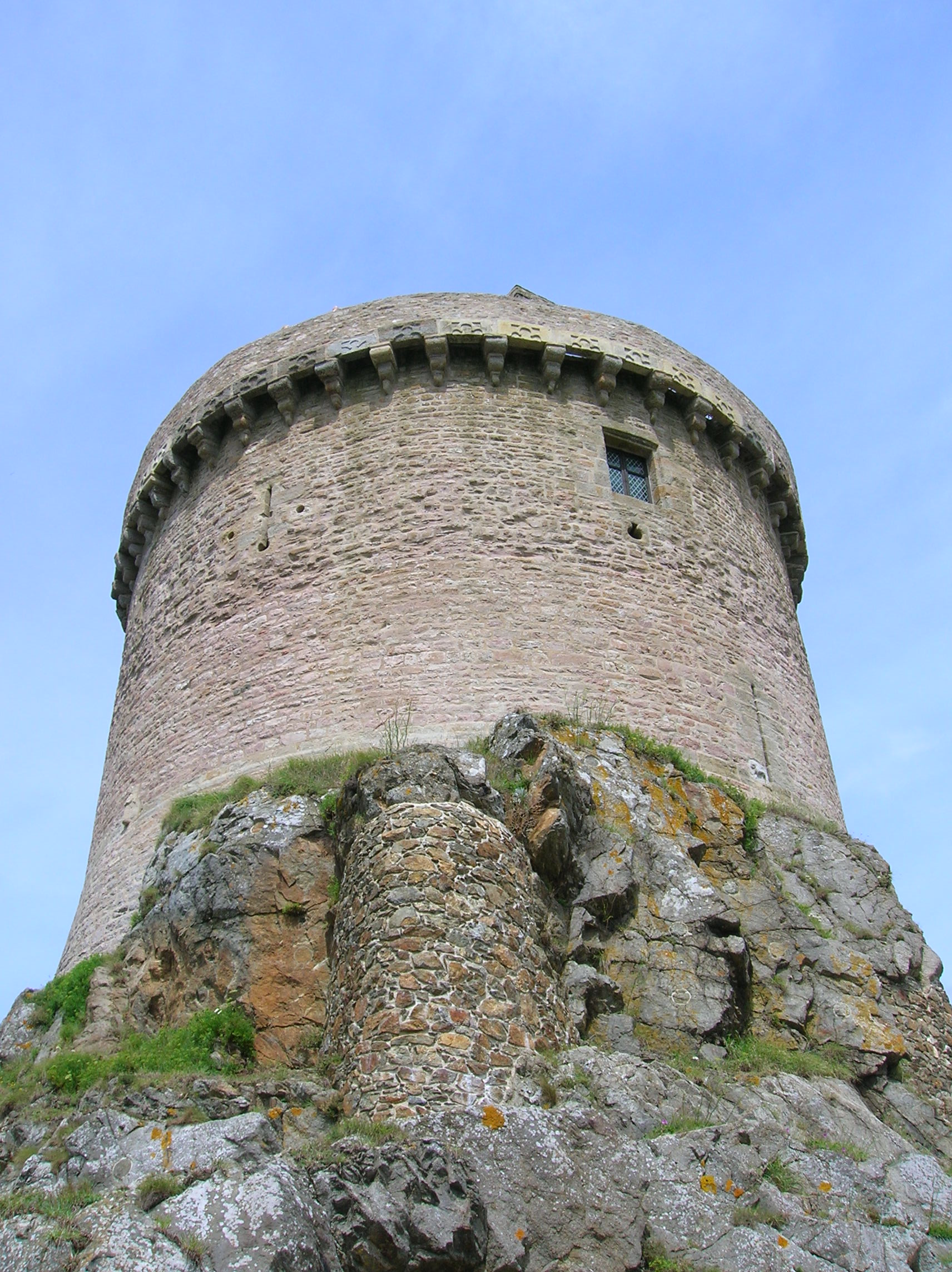
The keep.

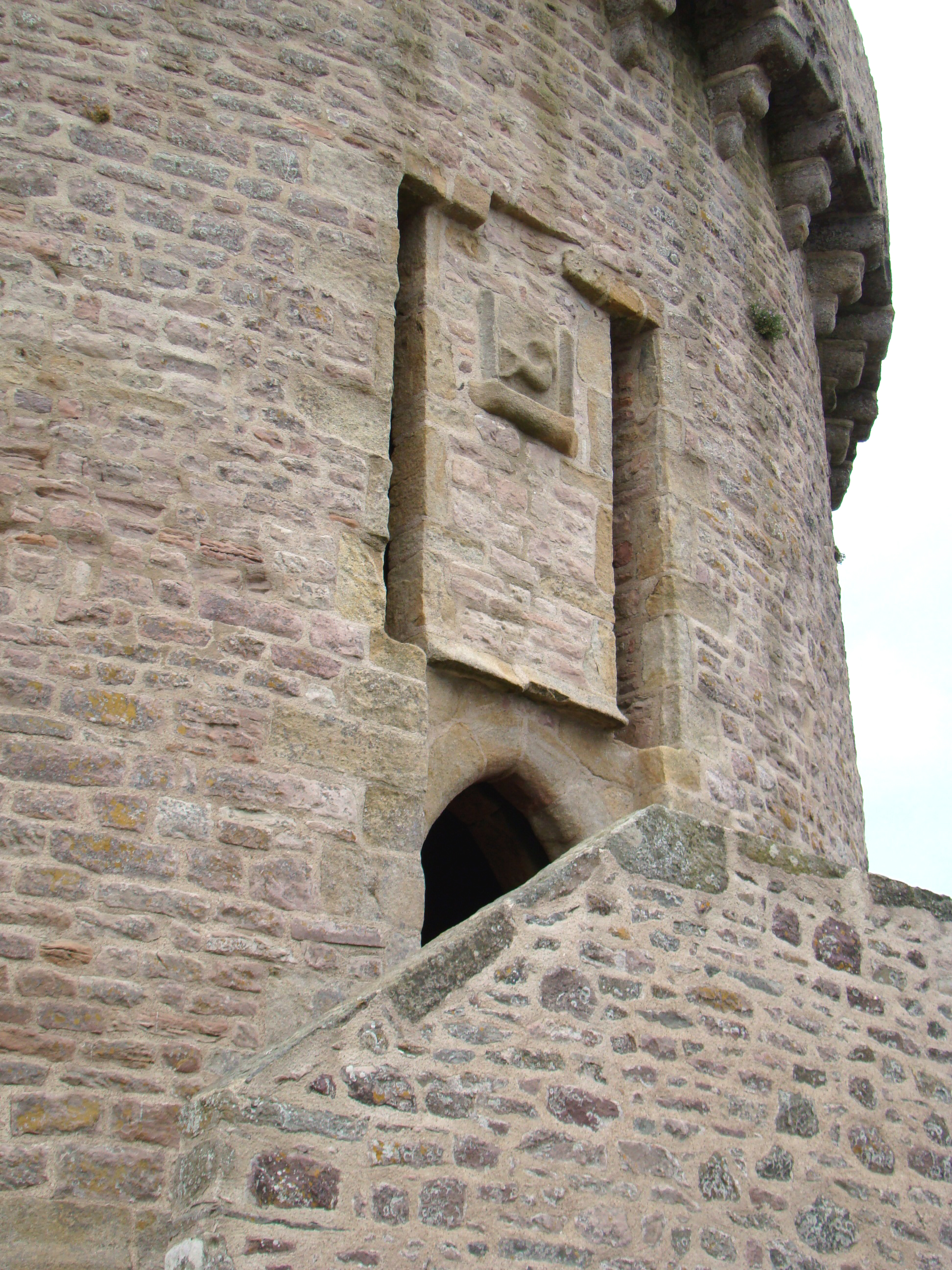
Enter of the keep.

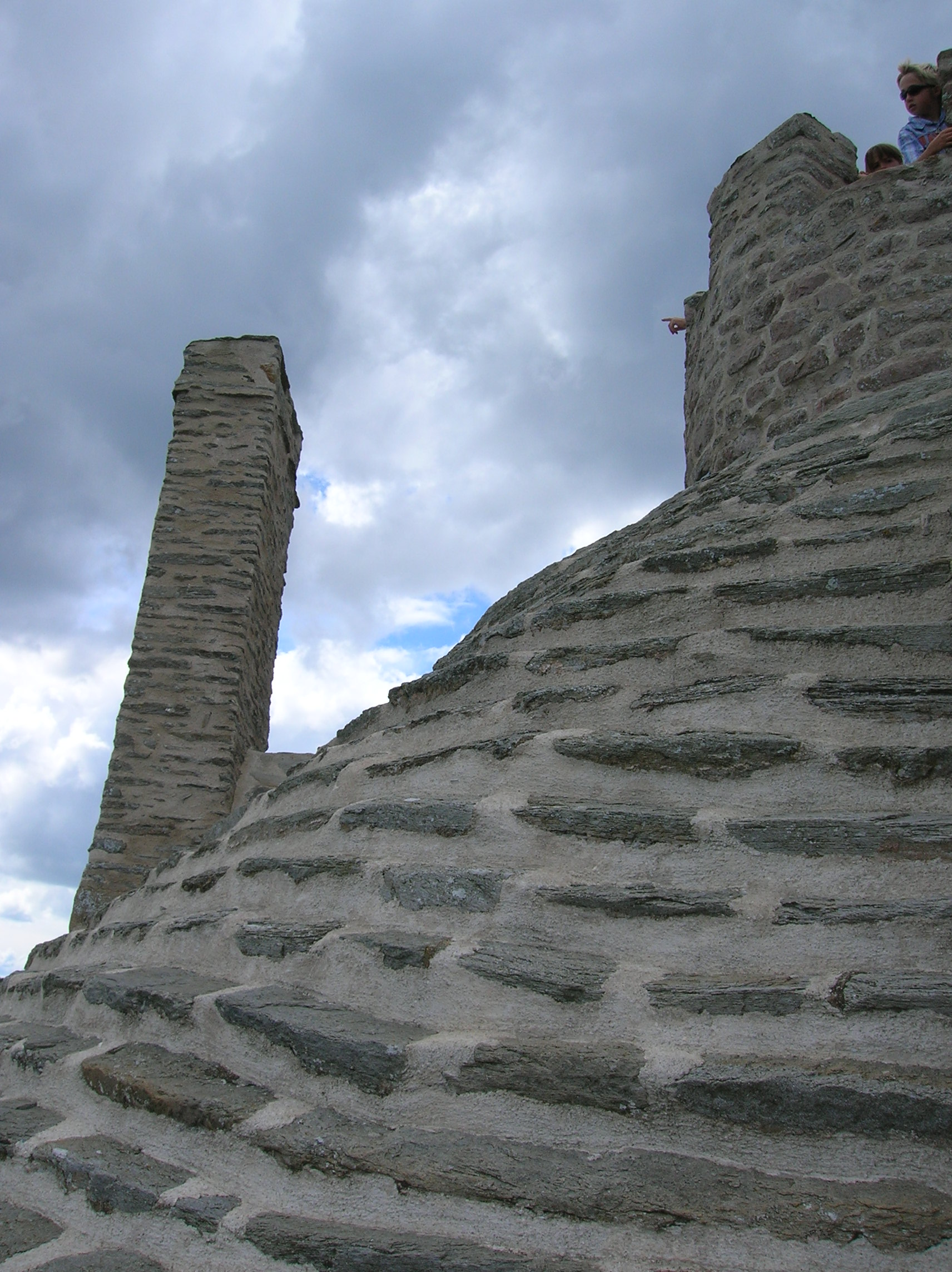
The roof of the keep.

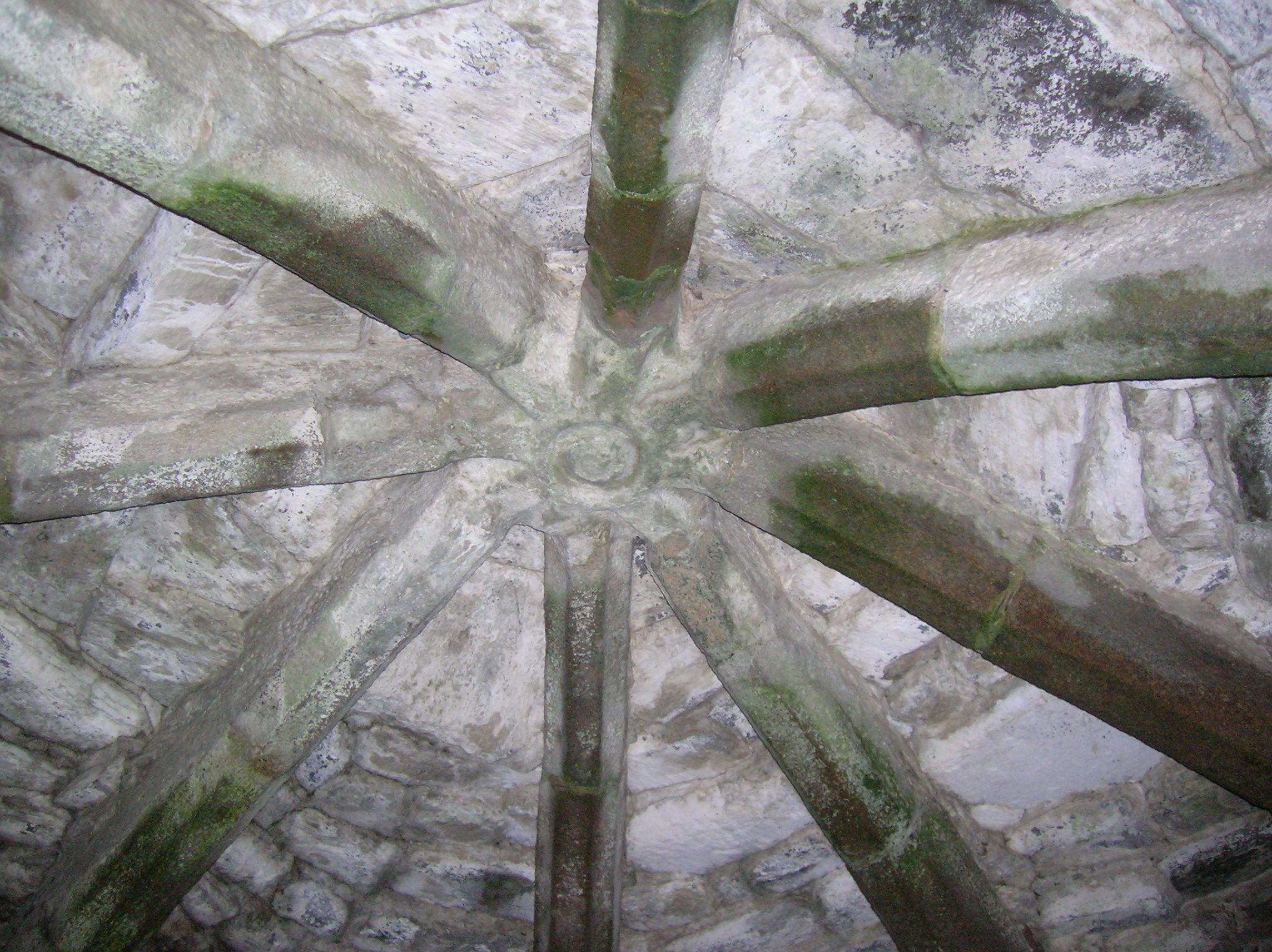
interior arched ogive roof

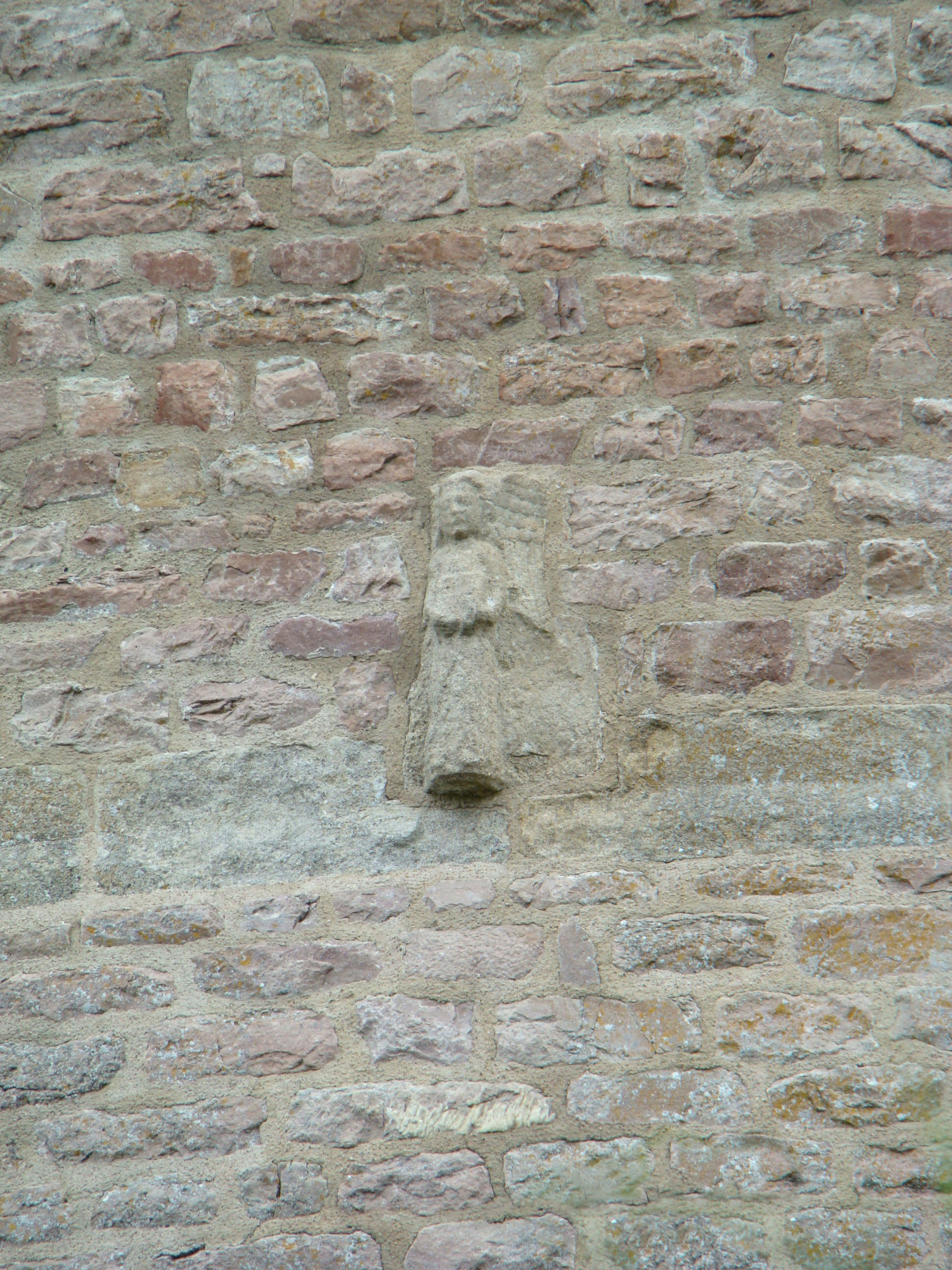
The angel of st Mathieu

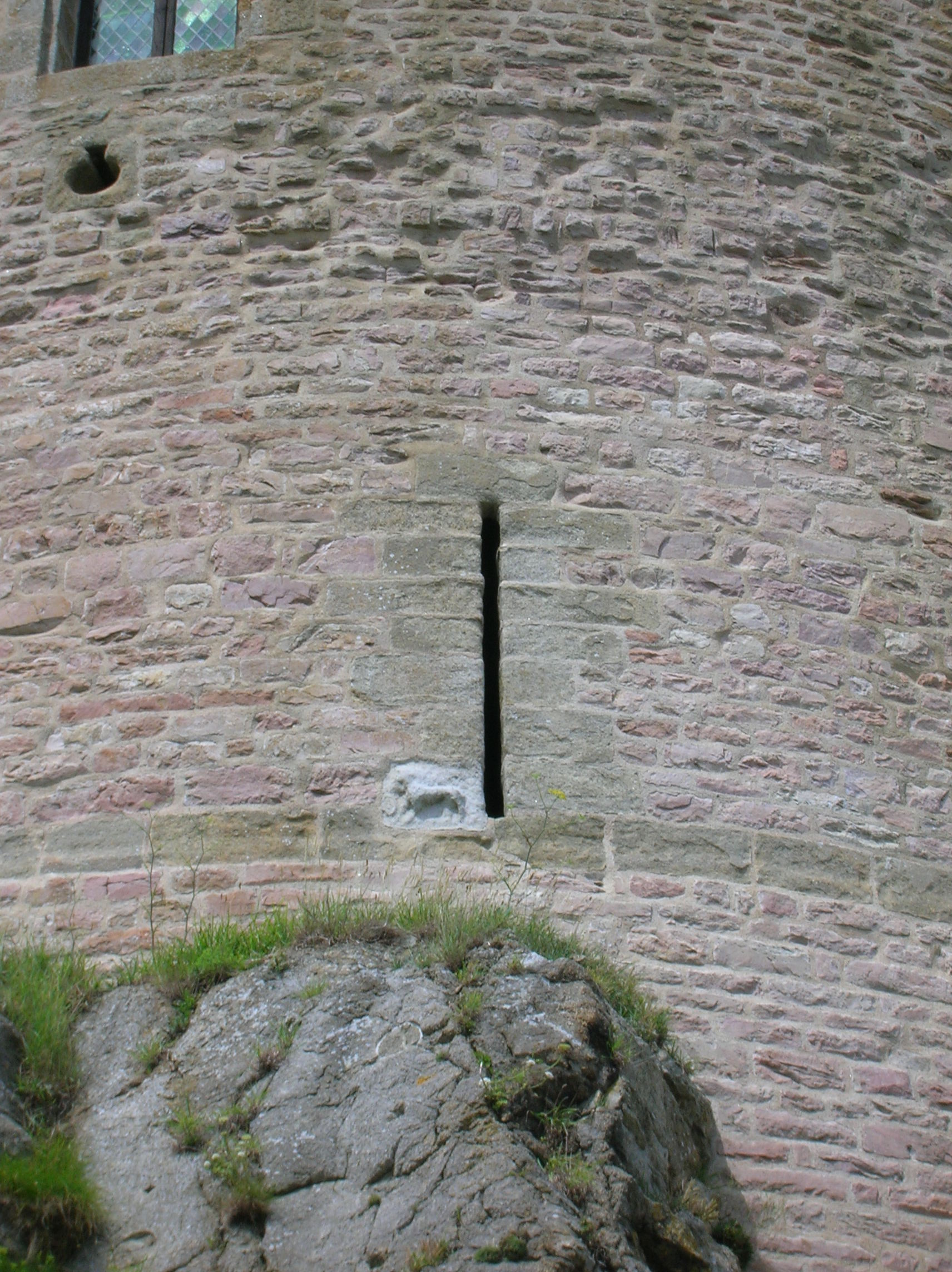
The lion of st Marc.

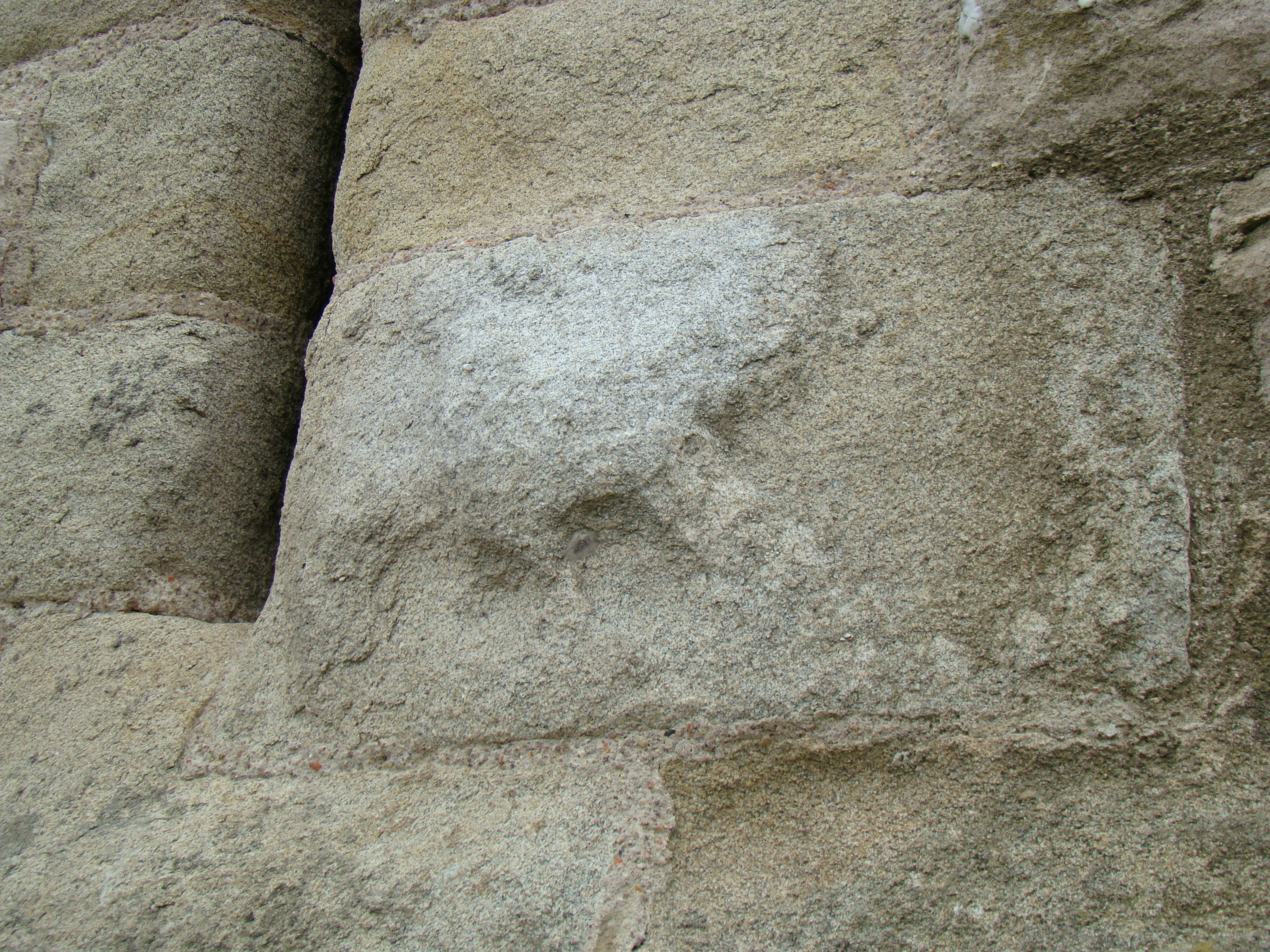
The eagle of st Jean.

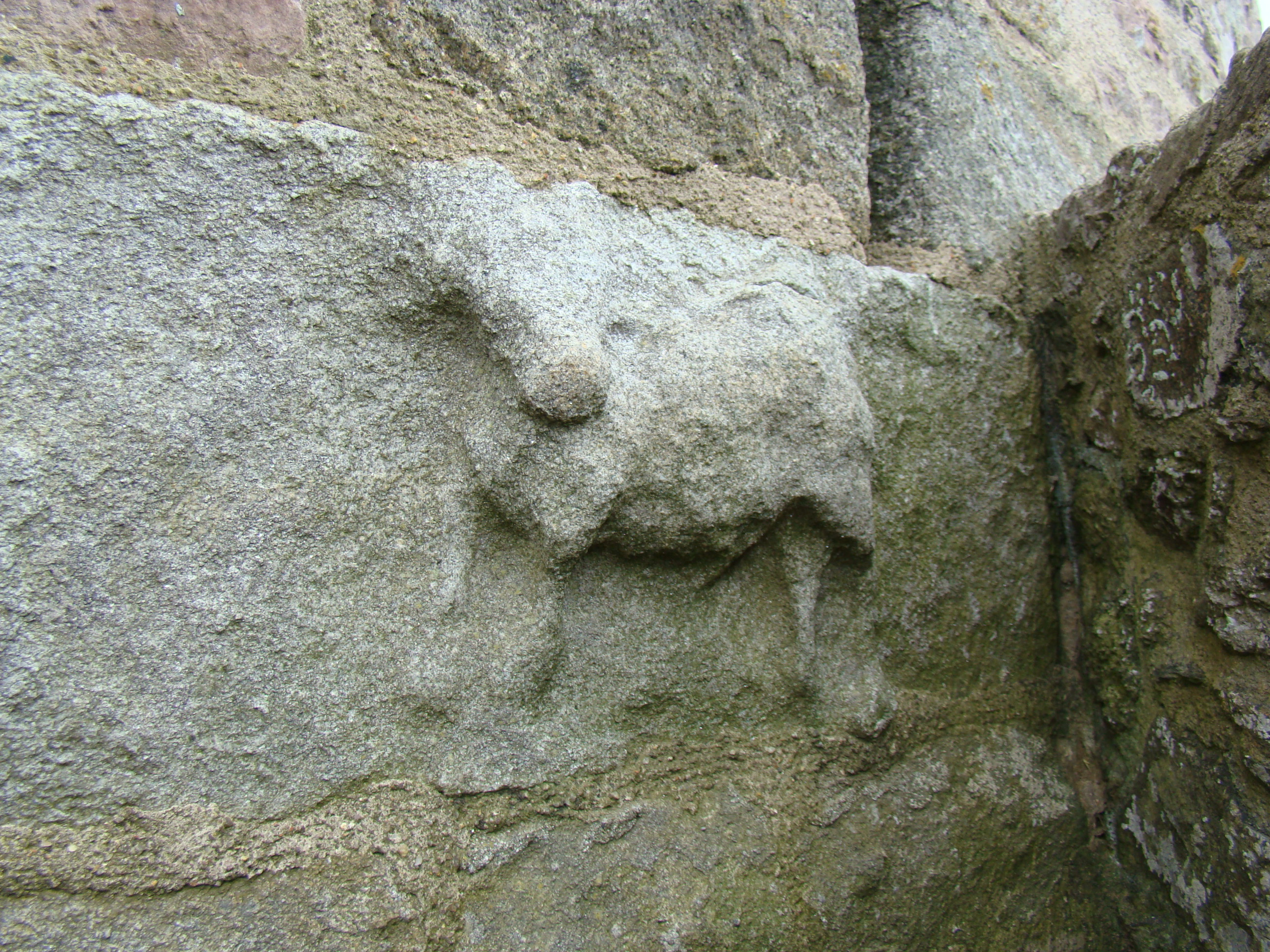
the bull of Saint Luke.

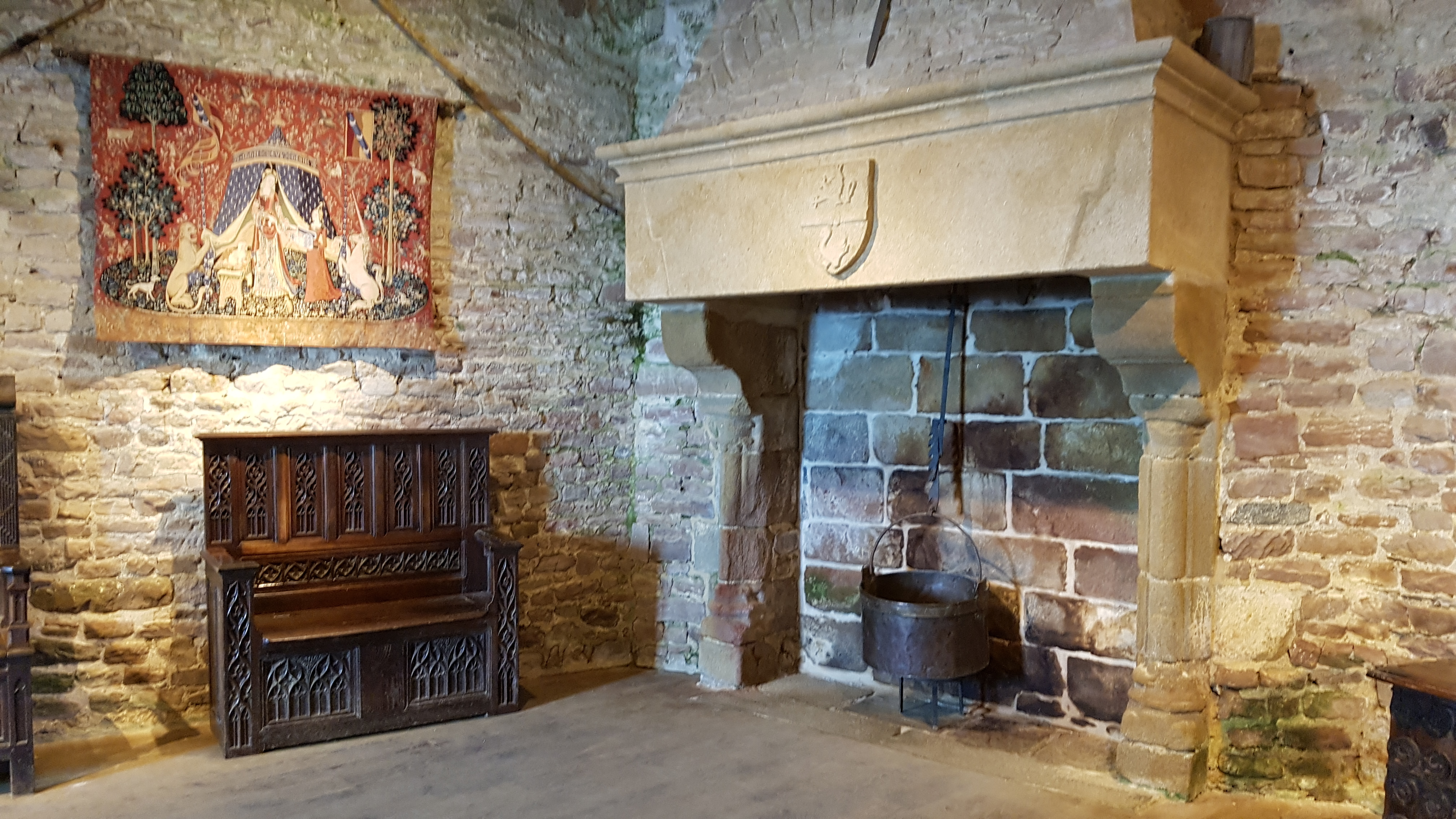
the first floor

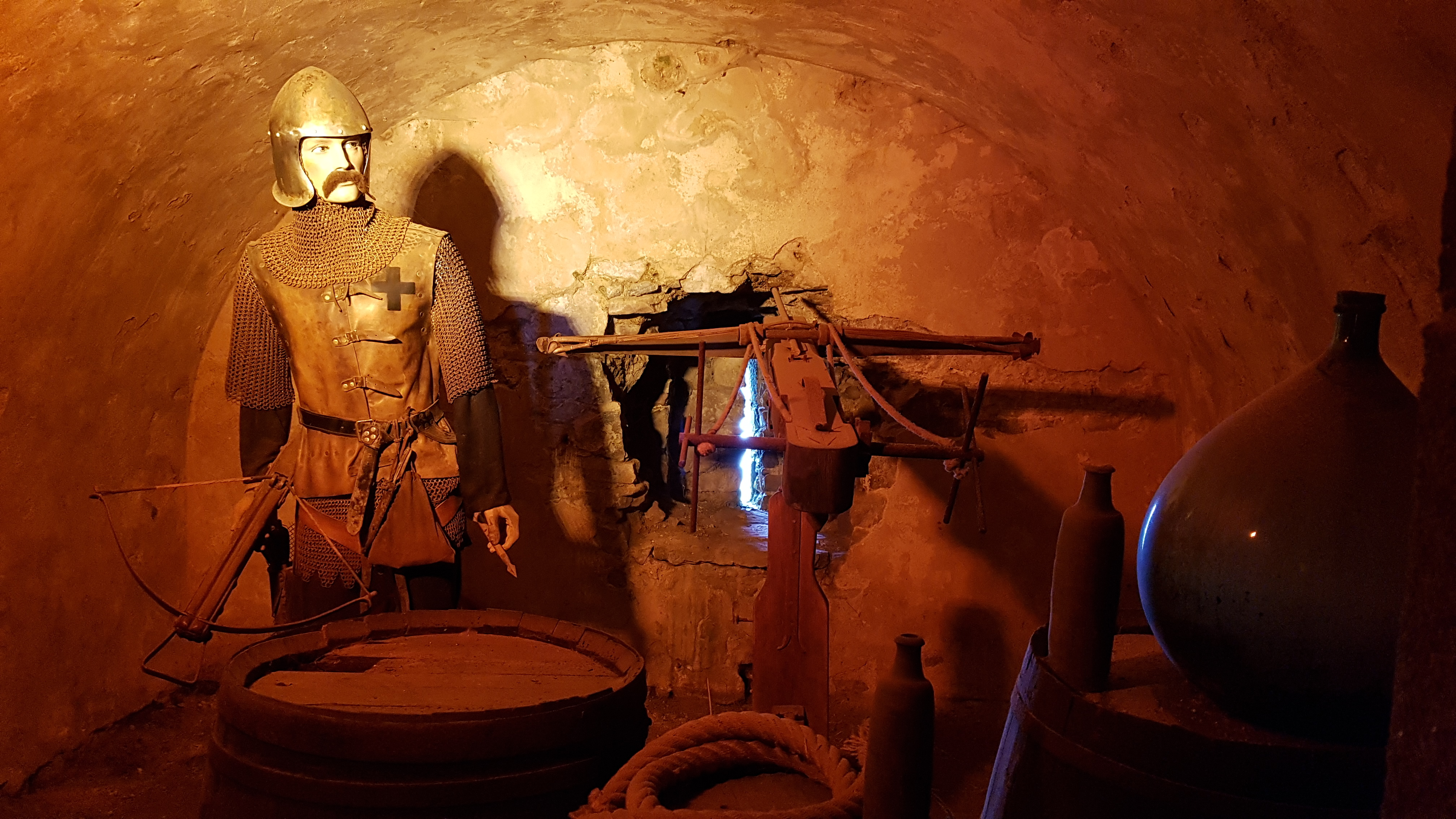
The powder magazine

== The menhir of La Latte ==
On the path leading to the castle stands a menhir known as the Doigt de Gargantua ("Gargantua's Finger"). The slender granite monument, which stands 2.64 m (8.7 ft) high, is associated with several local legends concerning the giant Gargantua and the Korrigans.

According to one tradition, Gargantua was crossing the English Channel to reach the coast of England when he passed through the area. Several features in the landscape are said to have been left behind by the giant during his journey. The menhir consequently has several traditional names, including Doigt de Gargantua ("Gargantua's Finger"), Dent de Gargantua ("Gargantua's Tooth"), Bâton de Gargantua ("Gargantua's Stick") and Aiguille de Guerrier ("Warrior's Needle"). According to different versions of the legend, the monument represents either a finger or a tooth lost by Gargantua, while marks visible in the rock at the foot of the menhir are traditionally said to have been left by his clogs and walking stick.

Another local legend relates that, at a time when humans and Korrigans lived alongside one another, the region was terrorised by giants. Humans and Korrigans are said to have joined forces to defeat them by luring the giants into a trap. Gargantua was supposedly one of these giants and was killed at Cap Fréhel after a fierce battle with the Korrigans.

According to this tradition, the giant's body was scattered across the surrounding landscape after his death. The rocky islets visible in the sea are said to be fragments of Gargantua's body, while the menhir near the castle represents one of his fingers, which fell at this spot and became embedded in the ground.

The monument was formerly surmounted by a cross. It has been suggested that the original prehistoric menhir was reshaped into its unusually slender form when it was Christianised.

The menhir of La Latte

=== Bibliography ===
- La Châtelaine aux deux visages, by Simone Roger-Vercel, 1957
- Le Jeu du Roi, by Jean Raspail, 1976
- Le Fantôme de Fort La Latte, comics strip from "Aventures de Vick et Vicky" by Bruno Bertin by Éditions P'tit Louis, 2007
- Le Fort La Latte, by Isabelle Joüon Des Longrais by éditions Ouest-France, juin 2009
- Le Chemin de Malefosse, comics strip by Daniel Bardet and Brice Goepfert, by éditions Glénat, 2015
- Christophe Amiot, Le fort La Latte, anciennement Roche Goyon, in French Archaeological congress. 173rd session. Monuments of Côtes-d'Armor. « Le Beau Moyen Âge ». 2015, French Archaeological Society, 2017, p. 97–110, (ISBN 978-2-901837-70-1)
- Sekijô No Shi, Le Château de la Roche Goyon dit Fort la Latte, imprimerie de la Manutention, 1973, (ISBN 2-9501512-0-5)
- Le secret de Fort La Latte, by Valérie Thiébaut published by Héros d'Armor, 1er décembre 2017.

=== Filmography ===
This castle served as a setting for several scenes from the following films, television films, television series and clips :

- The Vikings (Vikings) 1958, with Kirk Douglas and Tony Curtis, whose final fight took place on the keep.
- Metzengerstein one of the sketches from the film Extraordinary Stories, 1967.
- Lancelot du Lac, 1970.
- The Dance of Death, 1983.
- Chouans!, French film 1987.
- The King's Game, 1988.
- The heart and the Sword (Il cuore e la spada, Heart and Sword) 1998.
- La Tribu de Dana, clip from the French band Manau, 1998.
- TV advertising for the search engine "Lycos" 2000
- Une vieille maîtresse, French film 2007.
- L'Épervier, the series for France Télévision with Aurélien Wiik, Martin Lamotte 2011.
- Avril and the extraordinary world, animated film, 2015.
- Ma Reine, clip from the French band Manau, 2018.
- Tasnif-e magali Kurdi, clip from the French medieval band Soñj, 2018.
- The Three Musketeers: Milady, 2023.

== See also ==
- List of castles in France
