= Côte d'Émeraude =

Section of the English Channel

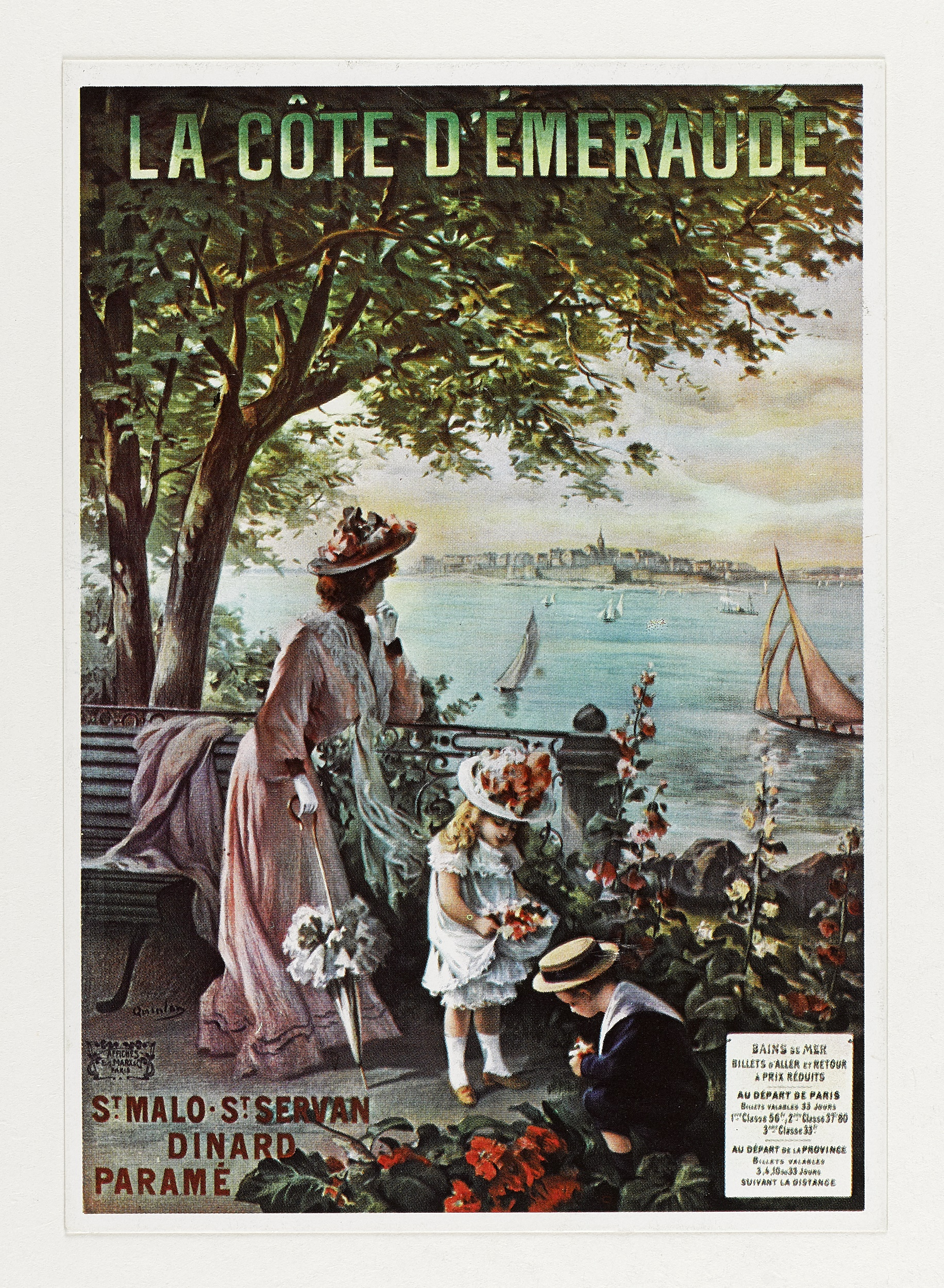
Postcard c. 1900

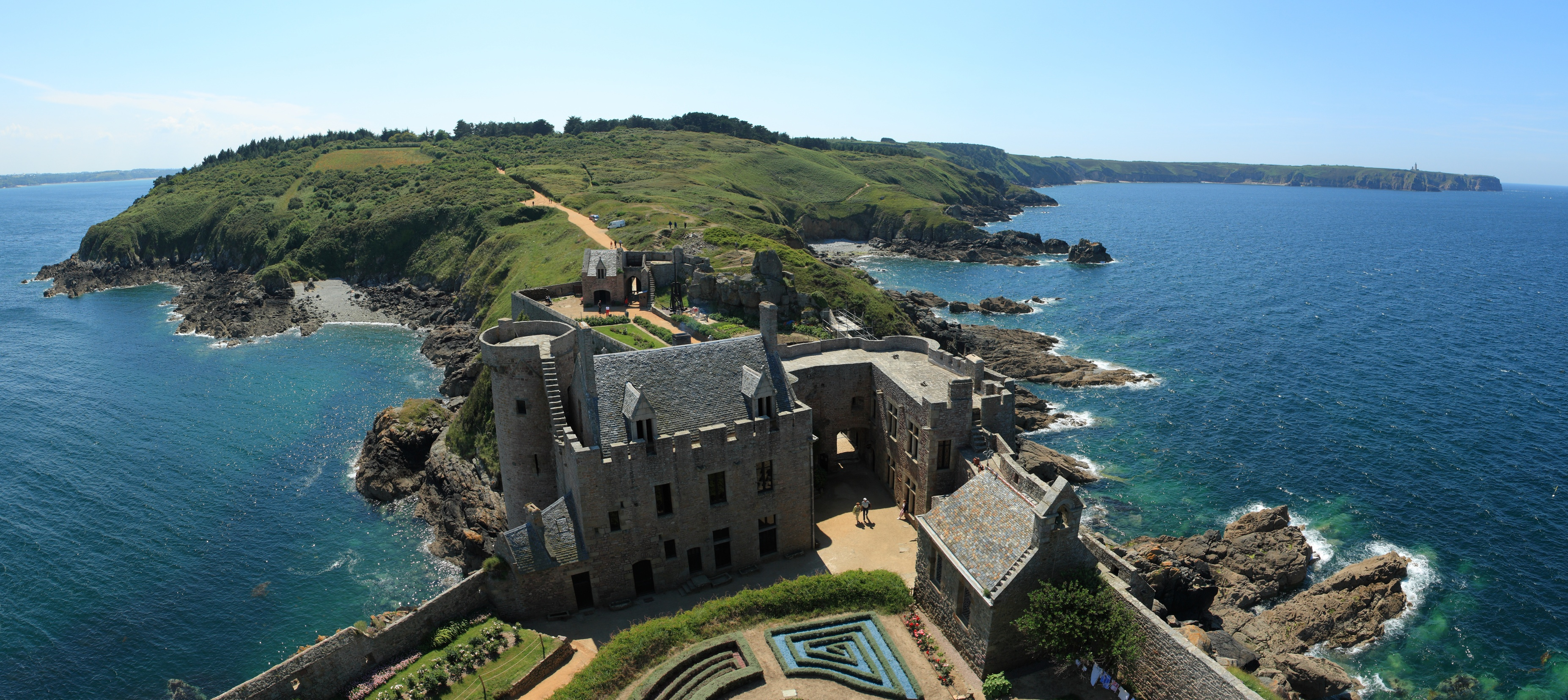
View from Fort-la-Latte

The Côte d'Émeraude (Breton: Aod an Emrodez; lit. 'Emerald Coast') is a name given to a part of the English Channel coast of eastern Brittany near the border with Normandy in France.

== Toponymy ==
Lawyer and historian Eugène Herpin coined the name Côte d'Émeraude in 1890. He was inspired by the "symphonie" of the colours of the sea and shore. The name was inspired by the branding success of the Côte d'Azur in encouraging tourism and development.

== Geography ==
The coast stretches across 120 km between Pointe du Grouin in Cancale and Cap Fréhel in Plévenon, is located in the Côtes-d'Armor and Ille-et-Vilaine departments, and includes the Rance estuary, Dinard, and Saint-Malo. The Bay of Saint-Brieuc lies to its west and Mont-Saint-Michel Bay lies to its east. The official Communauté de communes Côte d'Émeraude does not cover the entire area.

Plans to turn the Côte d'Émeraude into a protected park were conceived in 2003.

== In art ==
Painter Léon Hamonet, from Erquy, created many watercolours of the Côte d'Émeraude.
