= Fréhel, Côtes-d'Armor =

Fréhel Frehel
- Commune
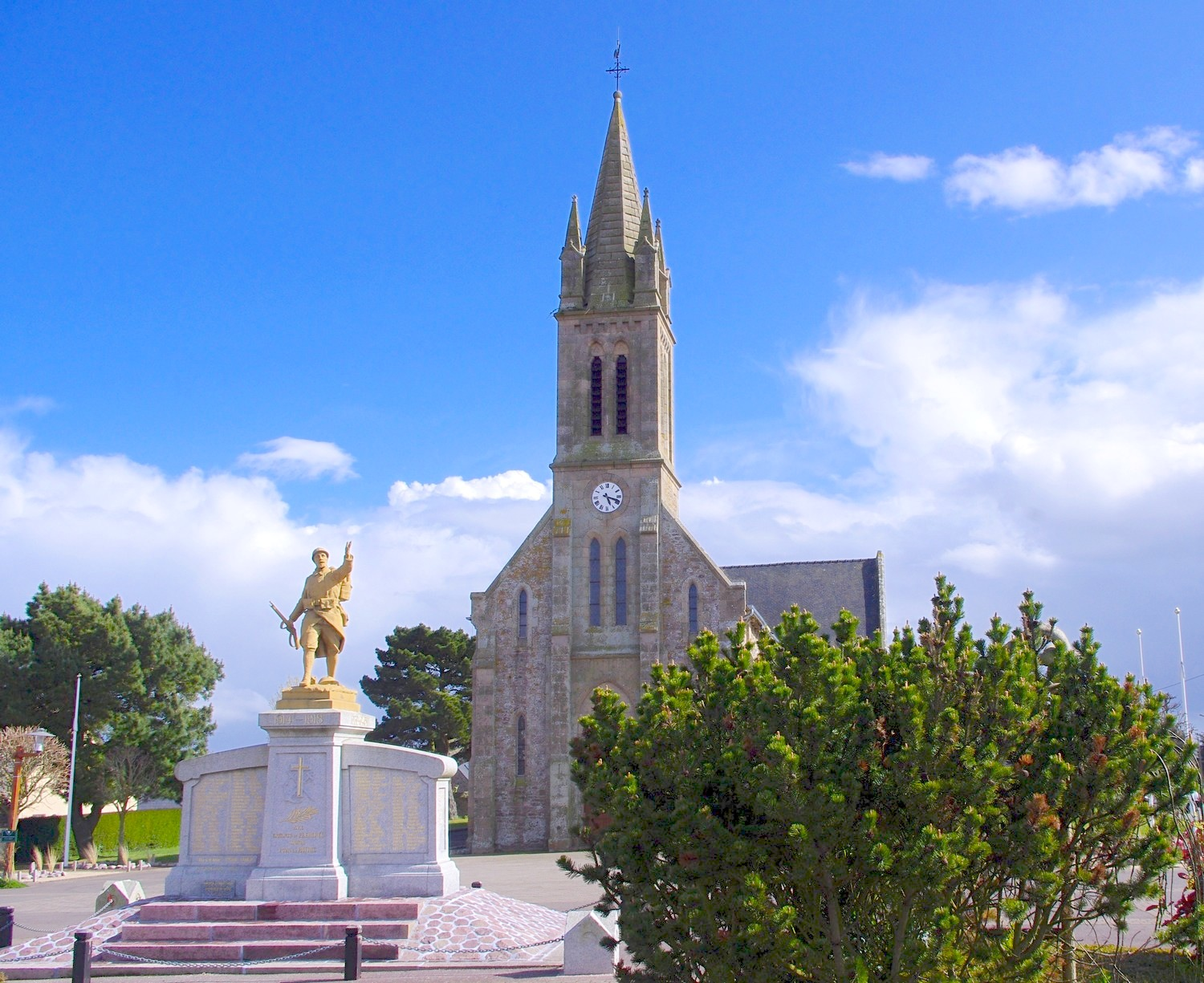
- The church of Fréhel

- Coat of arms
- Location of Fréhel
- Location within France Location within Brittany
- Coordinates: 48°37′45″N 2°21′53″W
- Country: France
- Region: Brittany
- Department: Côtes-d'Armor
- Arrondissement: Dinan
- Canton: Pléneuf-Val-André
- Intercommunality: Dinan Agglomération

Government
  - Mayor (2020–2026): Michèle Moisan
- Area^{1}: 32.64 km^{2} (12.60 sq mi)
- Highest elevation: 82 m (269 ft)
- Lowest elevation: 0 m (0 ft)
- Population (2023): 1,611
  - Density: 49.36/km^{2} (127.8/sq mi)
- Time zone: UTC+01:00 (CET)
  - Summer (DST): UTC+02:00 (CEST)
- INSEE/Postal code: 22179 /22240
- ^{1} French Land Register data, which excludes lakes, ponds, glaciers > 1 km^{2} (0.386 sq mi or 247 acres) and river estuaries.

Fréhel (French pronunciation: [fʁe.ɛl]; Breton: Frehel; Gallo: Fèrhaèu) is a commune in the Côtes-d'Armor department of Brittany in northwestern France.

This commune was previously named Pléhérel. Between 1973 and 2004, the commune of Plévenon was merged with Pléhérel and the combination of the two took the name of Fréhel, drawn from the name of Cap Fréhel, on which both communes were located. However, in 2004, Plévenon became once again a distinct commune, while Pléhérel retained the name of Fréhel for the commune.

== Population ==
Historical population
Year	Pop.	±% p.a.
1968	1,510	—
1975	1,420	−0.87%
1982	1,378	−0.43%
1990	1,326	−0.48%
1999	1,326	+0.00%
2007	1,569	+2.13%
2012	1,624	+0.69%
2017	1,567	−0.71%
2023	1,611	+0.46%
Source: INSEE

The inhabitants of Fréhel are known in French as fréhélois.

== International relations ==
Fréhel is twinned with Mafra, Portugal And Buncrana, Co. Donegal, Ireland

== See also ==
- Communes of the Côtes-d'Armor department
- Fort-la-Latte
- Sables-d'Or-les-Pins
