= April and the Extraordinary World =

- Theatrical release poster
- French: Avril et le Monde truqué
- Directed by: Christian Desmares; Franck Ekinci
- Screenplay by: Franck Ekinci; Benjamin Legrand
- Produced by: Michel Dutheil; Franck Ekinci; Marc Jousset
- Starring: Marion Cotillard; Philippe Katerine; Jean Rochefort; Olivier Gourmet; Marc-André Grondin; Bouli Lanners; Anne Coesens; Benoît Brière
- Edited by: Nazim Meslem
- Music by: Valentin Hadjadj
- Production companies: Je Suis Bien Content; StudioCanal; Kaibou Production UMT; Need Productions; Arte France Cinéma; Jouror Distribution; RTBF; Proximus; Tchack
- Distributed by: StudioCanal (France); O'Brother Distribution (Belgium); Métropole Films Distribution (Canada)
- Release dates: 15 June 2015 (Annecy); 4 November 2015 (France and Belgium); 19 February 2016 (Canada)
- Running time: 106 minutes
- Countries: France; Belgium; Canada
- Language: French
- Budget: $10.4 million
- Box office: $496,000

April and the Extraordinary World (French: Avril et le Monde truqué, lit. 'April and the Rigged World') is a 2015 animated alternate history film co-directed by Christian Desmares and Franck Ekinci, co-written by Ekinci and Benjamin Legrand, and starring Marion Cotillard. Set in a dystopian steampunk world based on the concepts and visuals of comic artist Jacques Tardi, the plot concerns a young scientist continuing her great grandfather's research and attempting to find her family, who have disappeared.

== Plot ==
The film takes place in a world where Napoleon III was killed in a building explosion and the Franco-Prussian War was averted by his son's shrewd diplomacy. Over the next 70 years, the world's scientists disappear one by one, causing technological progress to grind to a halt and pollution to spiral out of control.

In 1941, April Franklin, great-granddaughter of scientist Gustave Franklin, continues her family's work on a serum for ever-lasting life. So far, their only success has been April's pet cat Darwin, who has gained the ability to talk. Meanwhile, her family is pursued by the bumbling Inspector Gaspar Pizoni, who hopes to turn their research over to the government for use in wartime. April discovers that her parents perfected the serum years ago and hid the results inside her snowglobe. April finds a message of warning from her father and finds herself pursued by a noxious black cloud. She and Darwin are rescued by Julius, a petty criminal hired by Pizoni to follow her.

April uses the message to reunite with her grandfather Prosper "Pops" Franklin, who has spent the last 10 years hiding from Pizoni. Julius reluctantly turns Pops over to Pizoni. The authorities take Pops to a government weapons research center in Fort-la-Latte, where he finds other scientists studying a mysterious machine found at the bottom of the sea. The machine turns out to be an airplane powered by electricity. Julius returns to April just as a group of cyborg soldiers attack Pops' house. April discovers that the house can convert into a mobile bunker, so she, Julius, and Darwin use the house to flee to Fort La-Latte.

April, Julius and Darwin escape on the plane, which Pops has repaired, with Pizoni stowed away. On the plane, they find a film that reveals the truth behind the world's problems. The scientists have been kidnapped by two sentient komodo dragons bred by Gustave as part of his research back in 1870. The lizards, Rodrigue and Chimène, have used the scientists to create a jungle ecosystem underneath Paris, where the scientists work alongside the lizards' offspring on an ambitious project. The lizards remotely hijack the plane, but Pizoni brings the plane down in the jungle. April, Darwin, and Julius reunite with April's mother, Annette, who reveals the lizards' ultimate project: launching a rocket loaded with vegetation made invulnerable from the serum to other planets, terraforming them to escape the humans' wars, pollution, and violence. Pops and Pizoni are captured and imprisoned. There, they meet April's father Paul, who has been imprisoned for rebelling against the project.

April's group causes a blackout that frees the prisoners. Pizoni tries to escape while Pops and Paul try to find the others. At the rocket's launch, Julius secretly switches April's serum with plain water before handing it to Rodrigue who drinks the "serum" and reveals he has rigged the rocket to explode, wiping out humanity so he can take over the world. Rodrigue kills Chimène when she tries to stop him and Julius fatally shoots Rodrigue. April douses the vegetation on the rocket with her serum, fulfilling Chimène's plan, and Darwin redirects the rocket to space. The Franklins, Julius, and the scientists join Pizoni in escaping to the surface and witness the rocket exploding in space.

Pizoni becomes the head of Emperor Napoleon V's security service in reward for foiling the lizards' plot. With the scientists free, technology begins advancing rapidly. April continues to work on the serum but never finds a way to make it work for humans. Man finally reaches the Moon in 2001, where astronauts discover Darwin, still alive. An elderly Julius breaks the happy news to his wife, April.

== Voice cast ==
Character name	French voice actor	English voice actor
Avril/April Franklin	Marion Cotillard	Angela Galuppo
Darwin	Philippe Katerine	Tony Hale
Prosper "Pops" Franklin	Jean Rochefort	Tony Robinow
Paul Franklin	Olivier Gourmet	Mark Camacho
Annette Franklin	Macha Grenon	Macha Grenon
Julius	Marc-André Grondin	Tod Fennell
Gaspar Pizoni	Bouli Lanners	Paul Giamatti
Chimène	Anne Coesens	Susan Sarandon
Rodrigue	Benoît Brière	J.K. Simmons

== Marketing ==
The first poster of April and the Extraordinary World was released on 21 June 2015.

StudioCanal released the first trailer on 18 September 2015.

GKIDS released the first U.S. trailer on 22 February 2016.

== Release ==
The film had its world premiere at the Annecy International Animation Film Festival on 15 June 2015. StudioCanal released the film in France on 11 November 2015. O'Brother Distribution released it in Belgium on the same day.

GKIDS released the film in United States in 2016, starting with a limited release in New York on 25 March 2016 and then to theaters nationwide on 8 April 2016.

=== Home media ===
The film was released on Blu-ray and DVD on Aug 2, 2016.

== Reception ==
=== Critical response ===
On the review aggregator website Rotten Tomatoes, 97% of 58 critics' reviews are positive, with an average rating of 7.70/10. The site's critical consensus reads, "Bursting with a colorful imagination befitting its promise-packed title, April and the Extraordinary World offers spectacular delights for animation fans willing to venture off the beaten path." Metacritic, which uses a weighted average, assigned the film a score of 85 out of 100, based on 17 critics, indicating "universal acclaim".

=== Accolades ===
Year	Award	Category	Recipient(s)	Result
2015	Annecy International Animated Film Festival	Best Feature Film	Christian Desmares and Franck Ekinci	Won
2016	César Awards	Best Animated Feature Film	Christian Desmares and Franck Ekinci	Won
2016	Prix Jacques Prévert du Scénario	Special Mention	Franck Ekinci and Benjamin Legrand	Won
2016	San Diego Film Critics Society	Best Animated Film	April and the Extraordinary World	Won
2016	St. Louis Gateway Film Critics Association	Best Animated Film	April and the Extraordinary World	Won
2017	Annie Awards	Outstanding Achievement, Editorial in an Animated Feature Production	Nazim Meslem	Won
