= Sables-d'Or-les-Pins =

Coordinates: 48°38′27″N 2°24′24″W

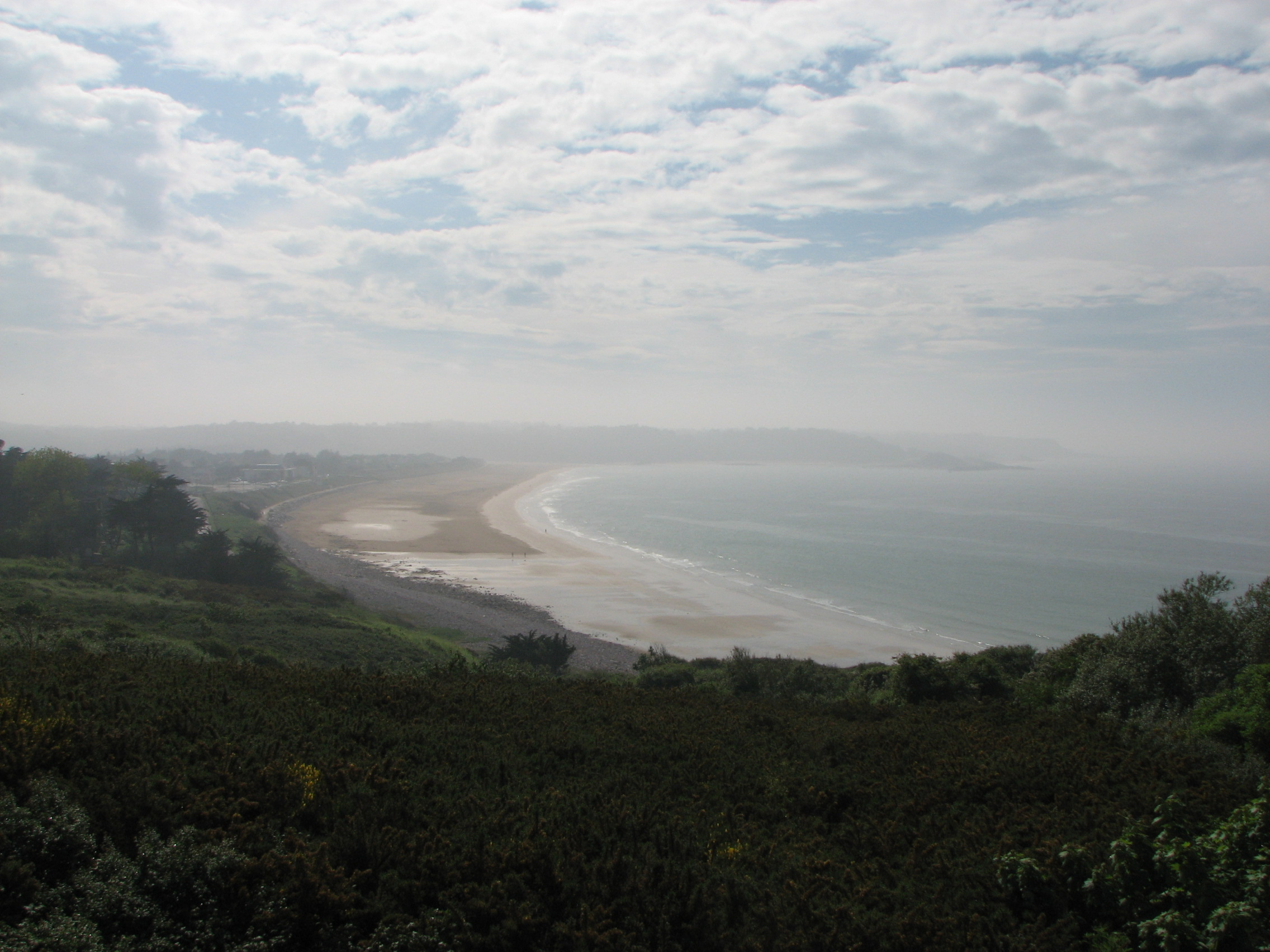
Sables d'Or main beach, east view

Sables-d'Or-les-Pins (French pronunciation: [sabl dɔʁ le pɛ̃], lit. 'Golden Sands the Pines'; Breton: Traezhennoù Aour ar Pinoù) is a French Seaside resort, located mainly in Fréhel commune in the Côtes-d'Armor department in Brittany in northwestern France.

It was created in 1921 and is known for its long beach located along a spit and its dunes.

Roland Brouard, the initiator of the project, intended to create a competitor to resorts like Deauville and La Baule.

In 1929, as a consequence of the Great Depression, the development of the resort stopped.

After World War II, Sables d'Or became a quiet family beach.

== Facilities ==
- Harbour (used by a quarry)
- Casino
- Golf Course
- Sailing school and club
- Roman Catholic Chapel

== See also ==
- Fréhel
