= Saint-Brieuc Offshore Wind Farm =

Offshore wind farm north of France

Saint-Brieuc Wind Farm
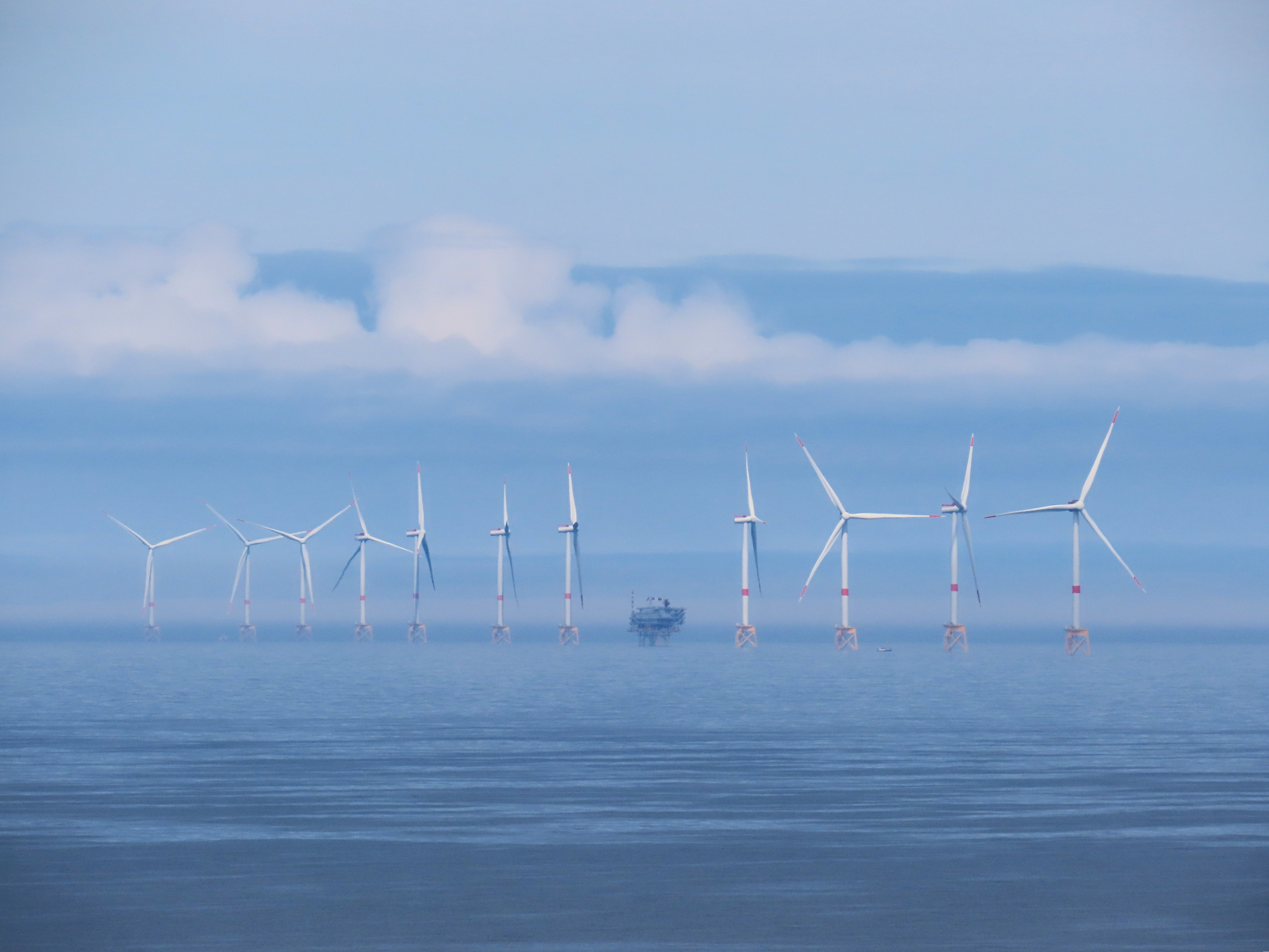
- View of the wind farm from Cap Fréhel.
- Country: France
- Coordinates: 48°51′36″N 2°32′06″W

Wind farm
- Type: Offshore
- Rotor diameter: 167 m (548 ft)
- Site elevation: 0 m (0 ft)

Power generation
- Units under const.: 62 × 8 MW
- Nameplate capacity: 496 MW

External links
- Website: ailes-marines.bzh/le-projet/le-projet-en-bref/
- Commons: Related media on Commons

Wind farm layout

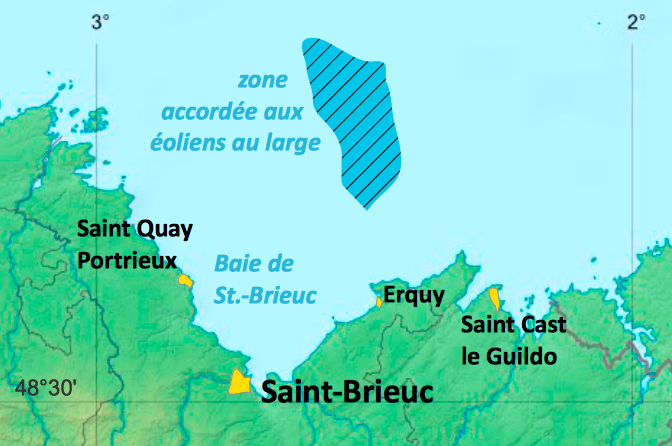
Map of location

Saint-Brieuc Offshore Wind Farm (French: Parc éolien en baie de Saint-Brieuc) is a wind farm located off the north coast of Brittany, France, near Saint-Brieuc. The wind farm was developed by Iberdrola and comprises 62 Siemens Gamesa turbines.
