= Cap Fréhel =

Peninsula in Brittany, France

Coordinates: 48°41′N 2°19′W

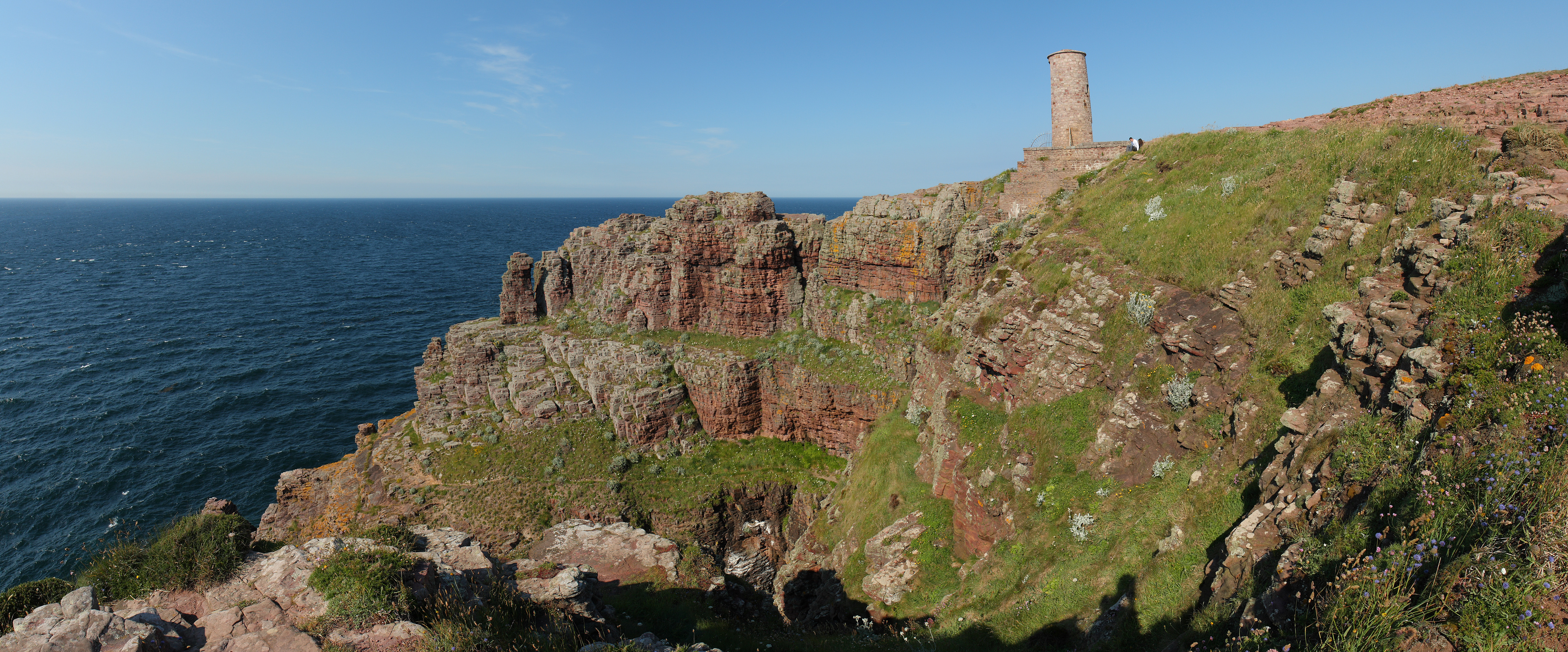
Cap Fréhel peninsula's cliffs

Cap Fréhel is a peninsula in Côtes-d'Armor, in northern Brittany, France which extends off the Côte d'Émeraude into the Bay of Saint-Malo. The cape is 8.5 kilometres (5.3 miles) from the town centre of Fréhel. Administratively, it is in the territory of the commune of Plévenon.

The peninsula is surrounded mainly by cliffs, which make it difficult to access it via sea. The whole of the undulating terrain is covered in moorland and marshes, which makes it difficult to construct any structure on the site. No towns or villages are situated on the peninsula; however, two lighthouses, one from the 17th century and the other one from 1950, are at its tip.

In 2024 the Saint-Brieuc Offshore Wind Farm was completed 16.3 kilometres from Cap Fréhel, with sixty-two 210 metres-high wind turbines generating zero-pollution electricity. They are visible from the cape most of the time, and their visual impact on this natural site has been criticised by activists and local associations.

It was the finish of Stage 5 of the 2011 Tour de France.

== Eponyms ==
- Cap Fréhel gives its name to Cape Freels on the island of Newfoundland.
- French actress and singer Fréhel had taken her stage name from this peninsula.
