= Plévenon =

Plévenon Plevenon
- Commune
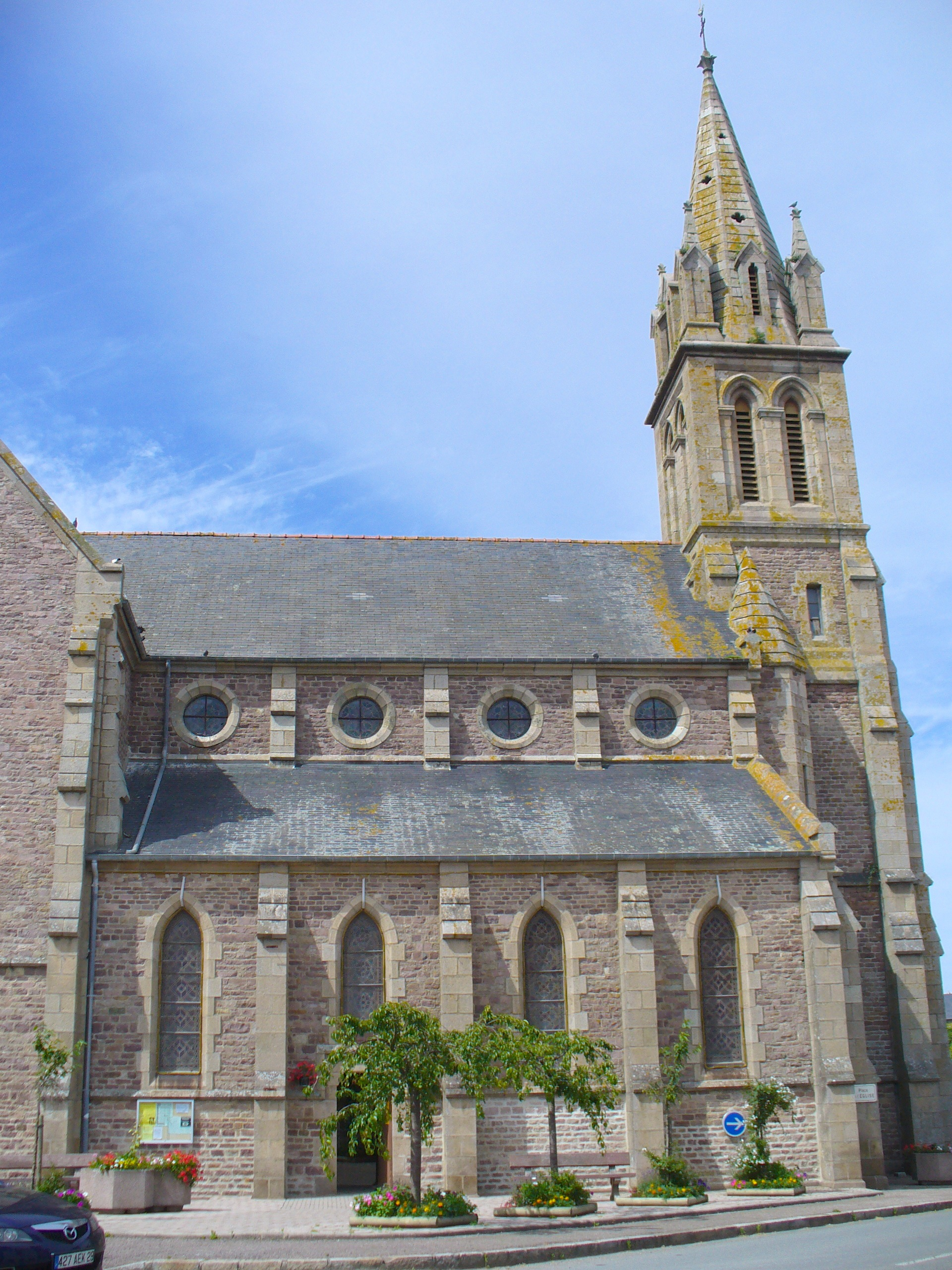
- The church of Plévenon
- Location of Plévenon
- Location within France Location within Brittany
- Coordinates: 48°39′20″N 2°20′00″W
- Country: France
- Region: Brittany
- Department: Côtes-d'Armor
- Arrondissement: Dinan
- Canton: Pléneuf-Val-André
- Intercommunality: Dinan Agglomération

Government
  - Mayor (2020–2026): Hervé Van Praag
- Area^{1}: 13.73 km^{2} (5.30 sq mi)
- Population (2023): 750
  - Density: 55/km^{2} (140/sq mi)
- Time zone: UTC+01:00 (CET)
  - Summer (DST): UTC+02:00 (CEST)
- INSEE/Postal code: 22201 /22240
- ^{1} French Land Register data, which excludes lakes, ponds, glaciers > 1 km^{2} (0.386 sq mi or 247 acres) and river estuaries.

Plévenon (French pronunciation: [plevnɔ̃]; Breton: Plevenon) is a commune in the Côtes-d'Armor department of Brittany in northwestern France.

On 1 January 1973 Plévenon was merged with the commune of Pléherel, after which the new commune was called Fréhel. However, Plévenon was re-established as a separate commune in October 2004.

== Population ==
Inhabitants of Plévenon are called Plévennais in French. Populations of the area corresponding with the commune of Plévenon at 1 January 2025.

Historical population
Year	Pop.	±% p.a.
1968	765	—
1975	696	−1.34%
1982	756	+1.19%
1990	669	−1.52%
1999	721	+0.84%
2007	685	−0.64%
2012	743	+1.64%
2017	781	+1.00%
2023	750	−0.67%
Source: INSEE

== See also ==
- Communes of the Côtes-d'Armor department
- Cap Fréhel
