= D110 road =

Road in Croatia

D110 state road

Route information
- Length: 41.6 km (25.8 mi)

Major junctions
- From: Tkon ferry port
- To: Muline ferry port

Location
- Country: Croatia
- Counties: Zadar
- Major cities: Preko, Ugljan

Highway system
- Highways in Croatia

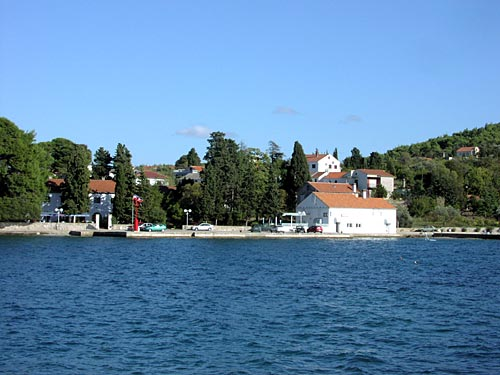
Lukoran, next to the D110 road route

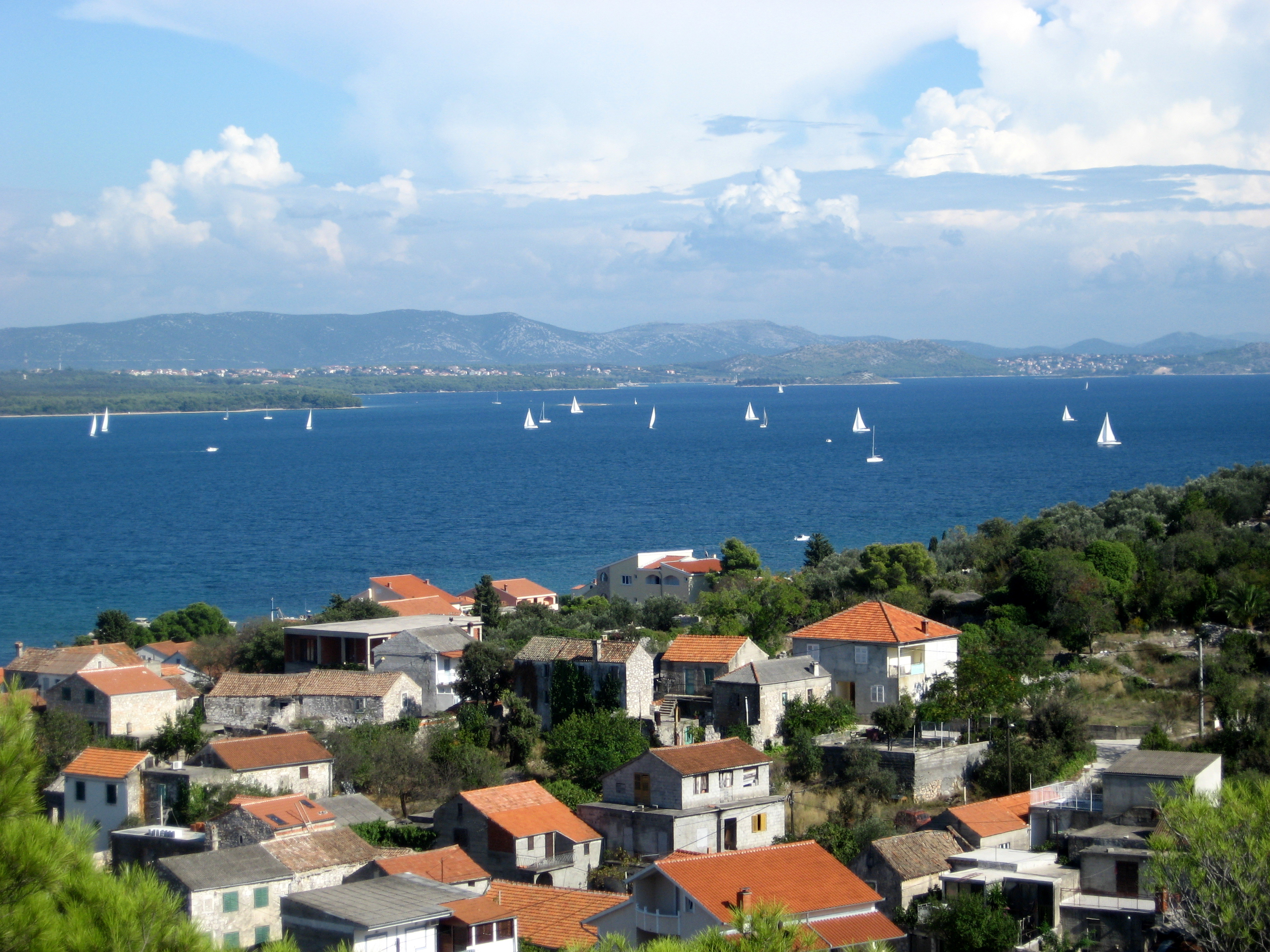
Tkon, at the eastern terminus the D110 road

D110 is the main state road on the islands of Pašman and Ugljan in Croatia, connecting the towns of Preko and Tkon. From these two towns Jadrolinija ferries cross to the mainland, docking in Zadar and joining the D407 state road (from Preko) and Biograd na Moru and the D503 state road (from Tkon). The road is 41.6 km (25.8 mi) long. The two islands are connected via the Ždrelac Bridge, spanning Mali Ždrelac strait.

The road, as well as all other state roads in Croatia, is managed and maintained by Hrvatske ceste, a state-owned company.

== Traffic volume ==
Traffic is regularly counted and reported by Hrvatske ceste (HC), operator of the road. Furthermore, the HC reports the number of vehicles using the Split – Supetar and Makarska – Sumartin ferry lines, connecting the D113 road to the D410 and the D411 state roads. Substantial variations between annual (AADT) and summer (ASDT) traffic volumes are attributed to the fact that the road connects a number of island resorts.

D110 traffic volume
Road	Counting site	AADT	ASDT	Notes
D110	4815 Kukljica	1,340	2,682	Adjacent to the L63171 junction.

== Road junctions and populated areas ==
D110 junctions/populated areas
Type	Slip roads/Notes
	Tkon ferry port – access to the mainland port of Biograd na Moru (by Jadrolinija) and D503 to Biograd na Moru and the A1 motorway Biograd na Moru interchange (via the D27). The eastern terminus of the road.
	Tkon; Ž6249 to Sovinje.
	Ž6249 to Čokovac
	Dicmo
	Ž6062 to Pašman. The road loops to the town and back to the D110 forming a total of two intersections with the latter.
	Ž6062 to Pašman. The road loops to the town and back to the D110 forming a total of two intersections with the latter.
	Mrljane
	Neviđane
	Dobropoljana
	Banj
	Ždrelac
	Ždrelac Bridge; The bridge is 210 m (690 ft) long.
	L63171 to Kukljica.
	Kali
	Preko; Preko ferry port – access to the mainland port of Zadar (by Jadrolinija) and the D407 to Zadar city centre and the A1 motorway Zadar 1 and 2 interchanges (via the D8). The ferry port is accessed via an interchange in the town and a short connector road.
	Sutomišćica
	Ž6245 to Lukoran.
	Ugljan
	Muline ferry port. The western terminus of the road.

== See also ==
- Hrvatske ceste
- Jadrolinija
