= Iž =

Croatian island

- Location within Croatia

Geography
- Location: Adriatic Sea
- Coordinates: 44.0336°N 15.1196°E
- Area: 17.59 km^{2} (6.79 sq mi)
- Highest elevation: 168 m (551 ft)
- Highest point: Korinjak

Administration
- Croatia
- County: Zadar County

Demographics
- Population: 615 (2011)
- Pop. density: 34.96/km^{2} (90.55/sq mi)

Additional information
- Postal code: 23284

Island coat of arms

Iž (pronounced [îːʒ]) is an island in the Zadar Archipelago within the Croatian reaches of the Adriatic Sea. Its settlements are located exclusively on island's eastern part, facing Ugljan. The main settlement, Veli Iž, is situated in the bay on the north-eastern shore, while Mali Iž is situated on the south-eastern shore and consists of three hamlets — Muće, Makovac and Porovac — located on three hills, below which are two bays — the bay of Knež below Porovac and the bay of Komoševa below Makovac.

== Geography ==
=== Geology and topology ===
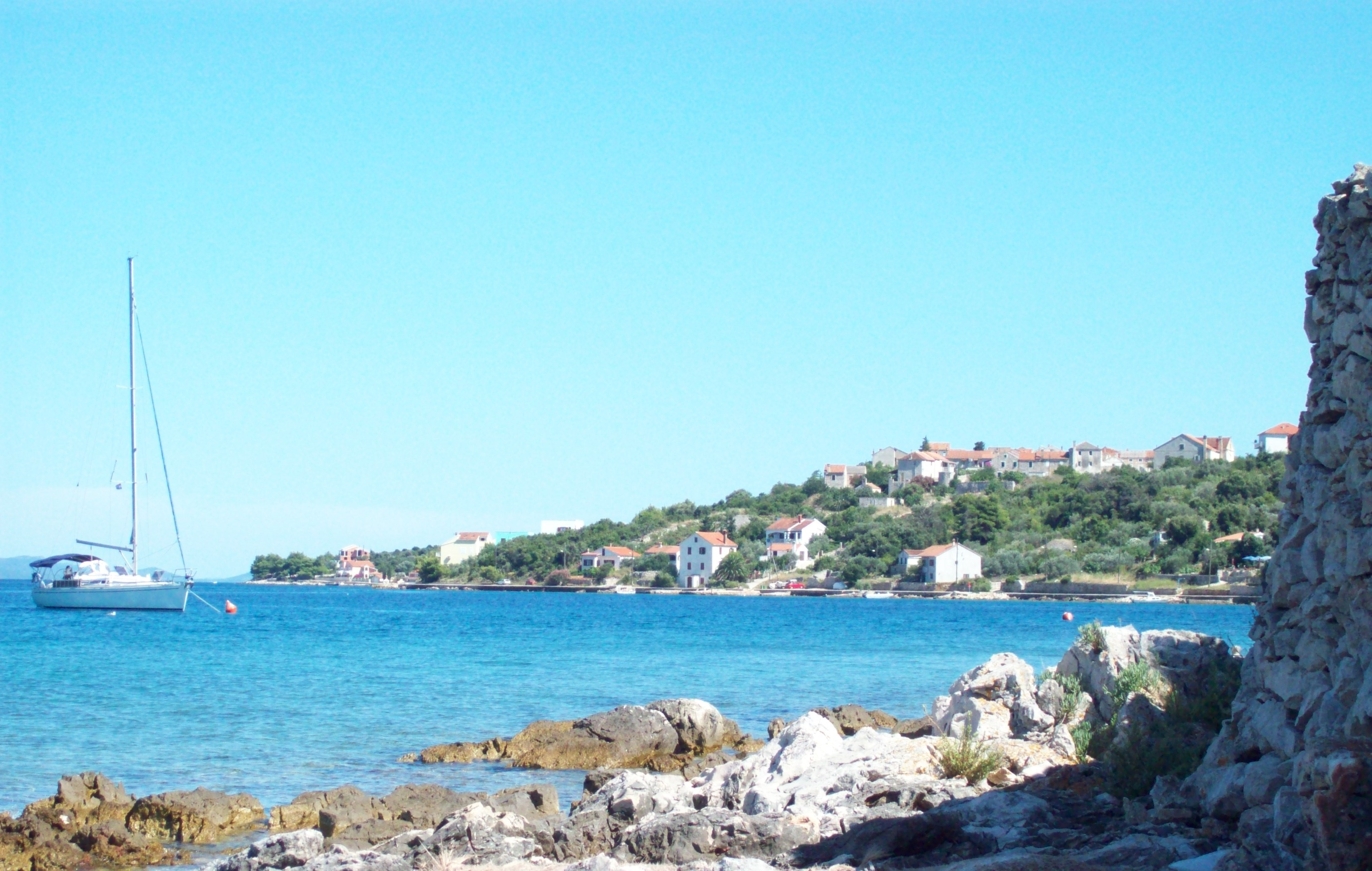
Beach near the bay of Knež, Mali Iž, as seen in August 2009. Hamlet Makovac can be seen on the top of the hill in the background.

The island is situated between Ugljan on the north-east and Dugi Otok on the south-west. Of all the islands of the Zadar Archipelago, the closest one to Iž is the island of Rava, situated between Iž and Dugi Otok. Iž and Rava are separated by the channel Iški kanal (average width about 2.5 km; 1.5 miles). Iž has a length of 12.2 km (7.5 miles) and average width of 2.5 km (1.5 miles). It has an area of 17.59 square kilometers (6.8 square miles) and a population of 615 (according to 2011 census), so it is one of the smallest islands in Zadar's group of islands. The length of the coast is 35.1 km (21.8 miles). Iž, like the other islands of Zadar Archipelago, lies in the direction Northwest–Southeast (NW-SE) meaning it is parallel with the mainland. Its mineralogy is composed mainly of limestone and dolomite. The highest peak of the island is Korinjak (height: 168 m; 551 ft). Iž is surrounded by more than 10 very small, uninhabited islands, largest of which is Knežak.

The main soil types are terra rossa (Croatian: crvenica; crljenica) associated with limestone (cultivated and rich of hummus in the gardens of settlements) and sandy soils on the dolomites.

=== Flora and fauna ===
The vegetation of the island is Mediterranean, as on other islands of Zadar, which means that the forests are composed of coniferous trees. Due to the relatively high temperatures, Mediterranean plants are evergreen. The exploitation of forests created a macchia that is richer in flora in the south-western part of the island (on limestone) than in the north-eastern part (on the dolomites). About 60% of the island is covered with pine forest; the first afforestation of the island with aleppo pine begins in the 20th century, more precisely in 1931. The island's oldest and most important cultivated plants are olives, vines and figs.

=== Climate ===
Iž belongs to the area which has a borderline humid subtropical and Mediterranean climate. Summers are dry, warm or hot and winters are mild and rainy. Average annual air temperature on the island is 15 degrees Celsius (59 degrees Fahrenheit).

The island is relatively low and spatially small so that significant day and night winds can form there. It is relatively far from the mainland, surrounded on all sides by the sea and protected by neighboring higher islands. The most common winds are bora (Croatian: bura) during winter, sirocco (Croatian: jugo) during spring, autumn and winter and maestral - a constant humid breeze of moderate intensity - during summer. The strength of bora usually decreases from the mainland towards the open sea; Iž is in the „Srednji kanal“ channel especially protected by Ugljan and Pašman.

The average annual humidity on Iž is about 70% and the annual rainfall is about 880 mm (1989 data).

== History ==
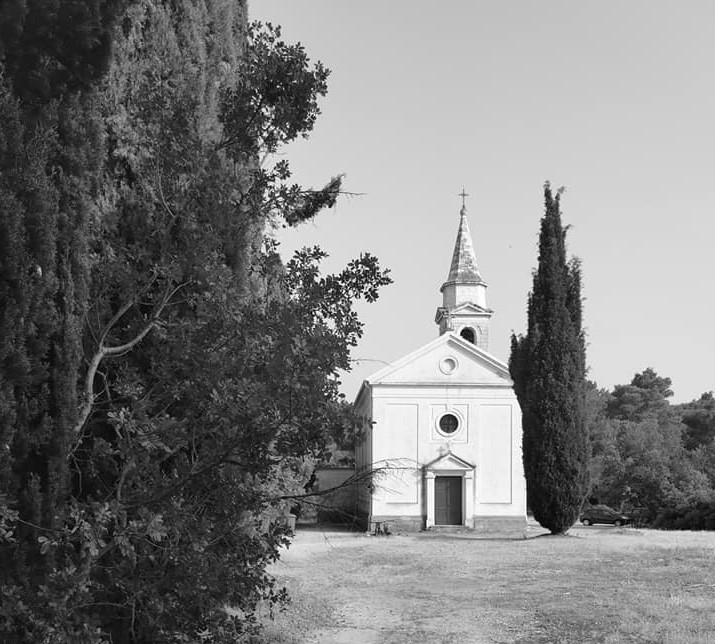
Parish church of St. Mary in Mali Iž. Author of the photograph Ana Barbir

The island of Iž has been inhabited since prehistoric times; there are traces of an Illyrian hillfort and a Roman settlement. Constantine VII calls it „Ez“ in 10th century. In that time it was under the rule of the Zadar commune, which, as a feud, gave it to the female Benedictine monastery of St. Mary, and later leased to the Zadar aristocracy. Above the bay of Komoševa, at the top of the village of Mali Iž, there is an old romanesque church of St. Mary from the 11th century, circular-shaped with a semicircular apse. It is located right next to the new parish church from the beginning of the 20th century and represents the oldest cultural monument on the island. There are also records of the first Croatian settlers that date from the year 1266.

Since 1409, Iž has been part of the Venetian Republic. In the time of Venetian-Turkish wars during the 15th and 16th centuries, many refugees from the mainland moved to the island, especially from Ravni Kotari.

Both the parishes of Veli and Mali Iž have a thousand-year Glagolitic history, meaning that from their beginning the Roman Rite in the church was celebrated in the Old Church Slavonic language, not in Latin, from liturgical books written in the old Croatian Glagolitic script. History records more than 200 glagolitic priests on the island and many documents in the Glagolitic alphabet from the 15th to 19th century are still preserved, including manuscripts, printed liturgical books and stone epigraphs. In 2019, a Glagolitic inscription in stone from 1685 was discovered in the family house Švorinić, being among the most recently reveled Glagolitic stone inscriptions in the world.

In the 18th and 19th century, Iž became one of the leading maritime and trade centers in the Zadar archipelago.

The castle of the Zadar family Canagietti has been preserved; the castle of the Fanfogna family, originally built in the romanesque style but later rebuilt, was converted into a school in the 19th century.

== Religion ==
List of administrators of Veli Iž parish:

1. Nikola (mentioned 1341)
2. Ratko, (m. 1397)
3. Nikola (m. 1400)
4. Pavao Vojvodić (m. 1455), of Veli Iž
5. Ivan Juanović/Zuanović (m. 1474)
6. Jure Milanić (1461–1501), of Zaglav
7. Antun Bogdanić (m. 1485), of Veli Iž
8. Šime Tolić (m. 1490), of Veli Iž
9. Petar Radinić (1546–1553), of Veli Iž
10. don Baninović (m. 1580), of Veli Iž
11. Jakov Bartulović (m. 1580), of Sutomišćica
12. Nikola Banigonić (m. 1587), of Savar
13. Nikola Mezić (m. 1597), of Luka
14. Šime Florinja/Floringović (m. 1603), of Sali
15. Matij Pribić (m. 1657), of Ugljan
16. Petar Marelić (m. 1662), of Mali Iž
17. Grgur Zelenčić (m. 1664), of Kali
18. Matij Barbić (m. 1669), of Luka
19. Ivan Švorinić (m. 1703), of Veli Iž
20. Mate Švorinić (m. 1706), of Veli Iž
21. Šime Švorinić (m. 1713), of Veli Iž
22. Mate Vojvodić (1718–1757), of Veli Iž
23. Dune Sutlović (1757), of Veli Iž (as chaplain)
24. Ivan Štokov (1757–1769), of Veli Iž
25. Dume Sutlović (1769–1779), of Veli Iž
26. Frane Belić (1772–1778 [sic]), of Ugljan
27. Ivan Letinić (1778–1785), of Savar
28. Ive Marijan (1785), of Veli Iž (as "assistant")
29. Grgo Burić (1785–1765), of Pašman
30. Ive Marijan (1786), of Veli Iž (as "assistant")
31. Ive Košta (1786–1799), of Preko
32. Frane Belić (1799–1801), of Ugljan
33. Miho Letina (1801–1802), of Veli Iž (as vice parish priest)
34. Šime Pavlakov(ić) (1802–1806), of Božava
35. Tome Škvarlić (1806–1807), of Veli Iž
36. Jure Čoban (1817), of Sutomišćica
37. Ante Sutlović Barićev (1818–1830), of Veli Iž
38. Tome Marijan (1831), of Veli Iž (interim)
39. Šime Paretić (1831–1862), of Božava
40. Fausto Smoljan (1831–1862 [sic]), of Ist
41. Ivan Marinović (1863), of Silba ("kooperator upravitelja")
42. Marko Cvitanović (1864–1871), of Veli Iž
43. Jerolimo Marojević (1869), as chaplain
44. Ante Oštarić (1869), possibly of Kolan
45. Ludovik Battig (1871–1878), of Tyrol
46. Roko Počina (1879–1885), of Ist
47. Hinko Brnetić (1885–1896), of Silba
48. Petar Nikolanzi (1892), of Pag (interim)
49. Ivan Milić (1892), of Sali (residing in Mali Iž)
50. Bare Vidor (1892), of Kali (poslužitelj)
51. Marko Mirković (1895), of Veli Rat (interim)
52. Lujo Pravdica (1896, interim)
53. Ivan Milić (1896), of Sali (interim, residing in Mali Iž)
54. Ante Jagić (1896), of Sali (interim)
55. Frane Šiša (1896–1897), of Preko (temporary)
56. Ivan Marija Bogdanić (1897–1925), of Silba
57. Jure Luša (1924–1925), of Silba (administrator in sickness)
58. Ante Nižić (1924), of Preko (administrator in sickness)
59. Ignacij Mašina (1925), of Preko (administrator in sickness)
60. Ivan Silvestrić (1925–1931), of Silba
61. Jakov Fabijanac (1931–1933), of Kaštel Sućurac
62. Marijan Milin (1933), of Sali (residing in Mali Iž)
63. Šime Meštrović (1933–1937), of Pag
64. Vladislav Cvitanović (1937–1969), of Veli Iž
65. Srećko Frka-Petešić (1967–1970), of Sali
66. Pavao Kero (1970), of Bibinje (temporary administrator, residing in Zadar)
67. Ante Vidaković (1971), of Bosnia (temporary administrator)
68. Pavao Kero (1971–1972), of Bibinje (temporary administrator, residing in Zadar)
69. Šanto Bilan (1972–1995), of Veli Iž
70. Josip Bunić (1995), of Hrvatsko Zagorje (temporary administrator, residing in Zadar)
71. Vinko Šolaja (1995–1997), of Šurkovac
72. Srećko Petrov (1997), of Bosnia (temporary administrator, residing in Zadar)
73. Stanisław Wieliński (1997–2002), of Pelplin Diocese
74. Andrzej Stępień (2002–2008), of Częstochowa Archdiocese
75. Krešo Ćirak (2008–2011), of Posedarje
76. Slavko Ivoš (2011 – 15 August 2018), of Kali

== Economy, culture and tourism ==
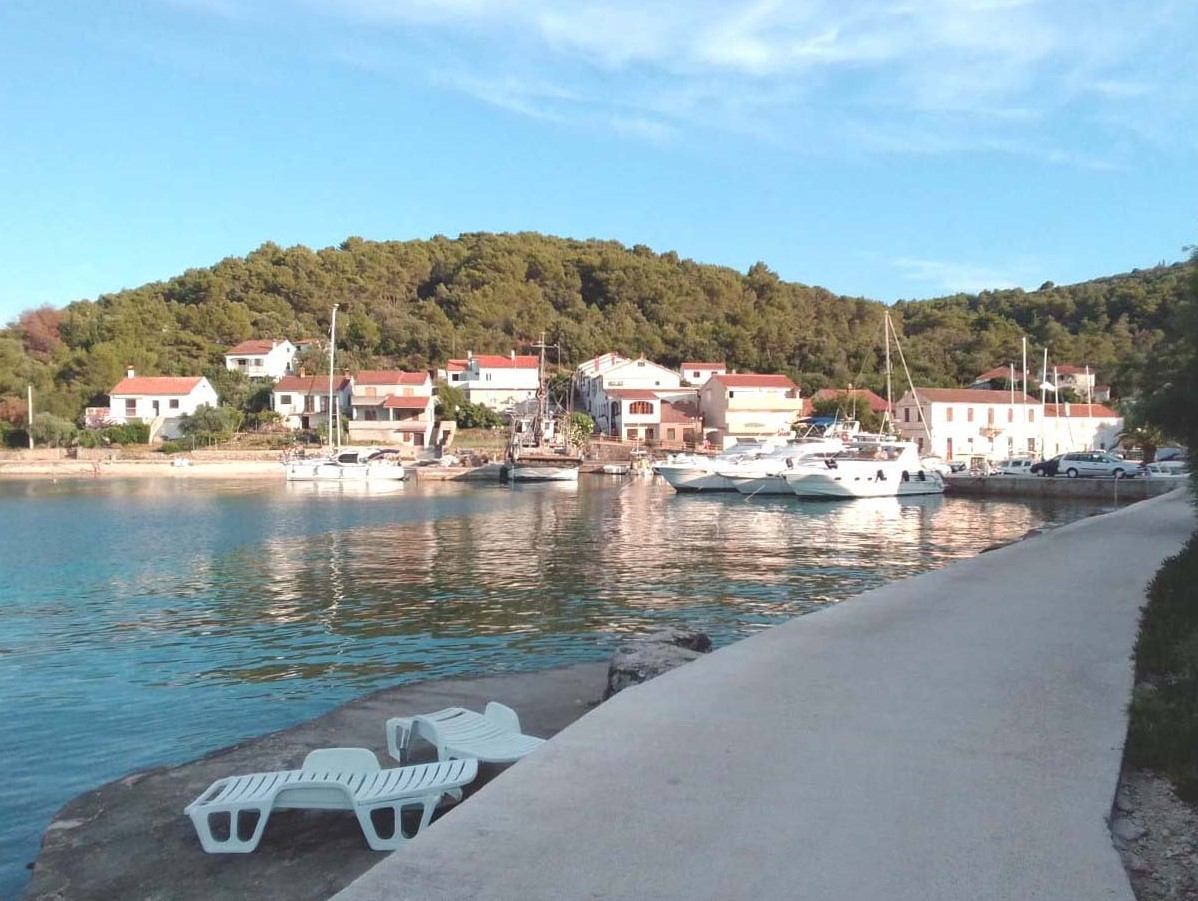
Bay of Knež with restaurant and accommodation Apartmani Knež

The small population of the island is mainly engaged into olive cultivation, fishing, viticulture and tourism.

The island also is known for its pottery tradition that has survived to this day: the ethnographic collection of Veli Iž preserves numerous examples of island's authentic ceramics and tools of traditional pottery.

Hotel Korinjak, located in Veli Iž, is the only hotel on the island, also representing the only vegetarian hotel in Croatia. The hotel offers meditation and relaxation therapies for mind and body energy, from yoga to pyramide meditation and orgon or ozon therapies. The hotel also offers boat trips and excursions to island Iž hidden bays or small unsettled nearby islets, where visitors can enjoy untouched nature and beaches.

Veli Iž also has a marina that can accommodate up to two hundred boats and the church of Saint Peter and Paul from the 14th century, with elements of romanesque although it is not preserved in its original form.

A traditional festival, Iška fešta (lit. "The Fest of Iž"), is held in Veli Iž every year on 29 July. The locals then dress in traditional costumes, perform old island dances and songs and prepare local dishes. The highlight of the ceremony is the election of the "King of Iž" (Croatian: Iški kralj) with a term of one year.

The revitalisation of the island was stimulated by the construction of the main road connecting Mali Iž and Veli Iž. Construction of the road started in 1980s by the Yugoslav People's Army. It was fully completed and paved in 1996, stretching in direction north-west–south-east, between Veli Iž and the ferry port in Mali Iž, also connecting Mali Iž hamlets Porovac, Muće and Makovac, together with the bays Knež and Komoševa, by the local roads.

== Maritime connections ==
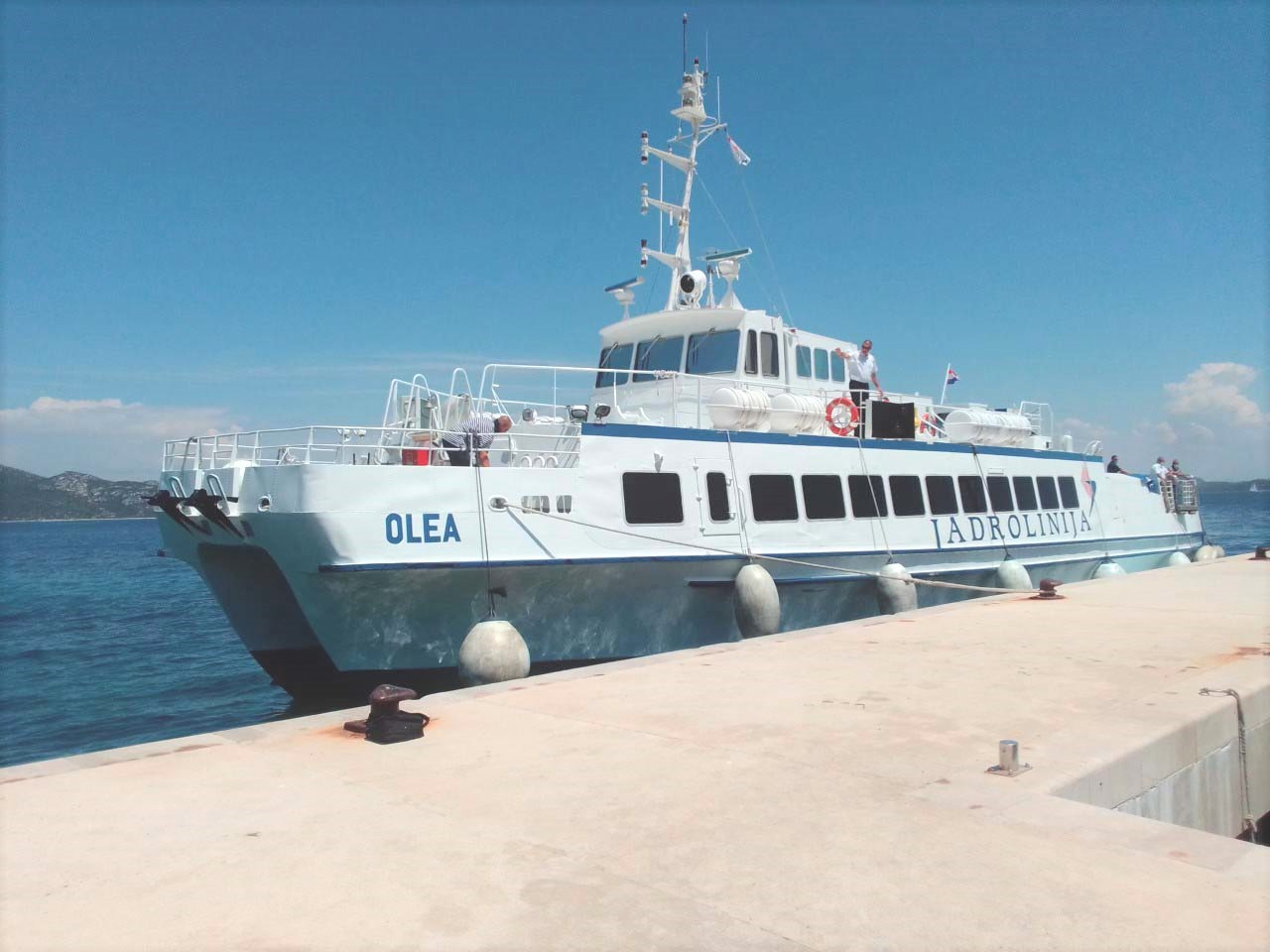
High speed craft Olea at the port of Mali Iž (July 2020)

Iž is connected to Zadar and Rava by passenger ship, high-speed craft and car ferry public lines. The two passenger-only lines start at Zadar ferry port in the town center, continue to Mali Iž (docking at the bay of Komoševa) and Veli Iž, from there they run to the two settlements on Rava: Mala Rava and Rava. After reaching Rava, they sail back in reverse. The car ferry starts at the Port of Gaženica, runs to Bršanj (located on the south-east of Iž) and, on certains days of the week, to Rava and Mala Rava. There is a bus line which connects Veli Iž and Mali Iž to Bršanj when the ferry arrives. On school days, there is an additional high-speed craft connection Zadar – Bršanj – Zadar, docking in the same place on Iž as the car ferry. All lines reach Iž from Zadar (and vice versa) within an hour and a half.

The shortest connection of island Iž with Zadar is through the strait of Mali Ždrelac, nowadays used by all public shipping services which operate to the island.

Before World War II, all maritime connections between Zadar and Iž were via the island of Ugljan. Since 1892, Iž has a regular steamship connection with Zadar through the strait of Veli Ždrelac between the islands of Ugljan and Rivanj (north-west from Zadar) and from 1980s that connection started to operate through the strait of Mali Ždrelac. Until 2012, only smaller ferries which connected Iž and Zadar (as well as ships and catamarans) could sail through Mali Ždrelac, while the rest of the ferries were sailing through Veli Ždrelac strait. In 2012, the strait was deepened which resulted in allowing all ships that sail to the island to pass through. Since 2014, ferries connecting Iž and Zadar (as well as other ferries which connect Zadar with the islands of its archipelago) have been using the port of Gaženica south of Zadar instead of original ferry port that was located in Zadar's town center.

The island's ferry terminal opened in the late 1980s. Hosting only a ticket office, it is located in the bay of Bršanj in Mali Iž. It is about 1 km from the center of Mali Iž where all the facilities are. Passenger ships and catamarans, however, use ports of Mali Iž (located in the bay and small settlement Komoševa) and Veli Iž (located in the bay near the promenade by the sea, in the town center).

== Notable residents ==
Krsto Novaselić, the father of Nirvana bassist Krist Novoselic, lived in Veli Iž before immigrating to the United States.

== Nearby islands ==
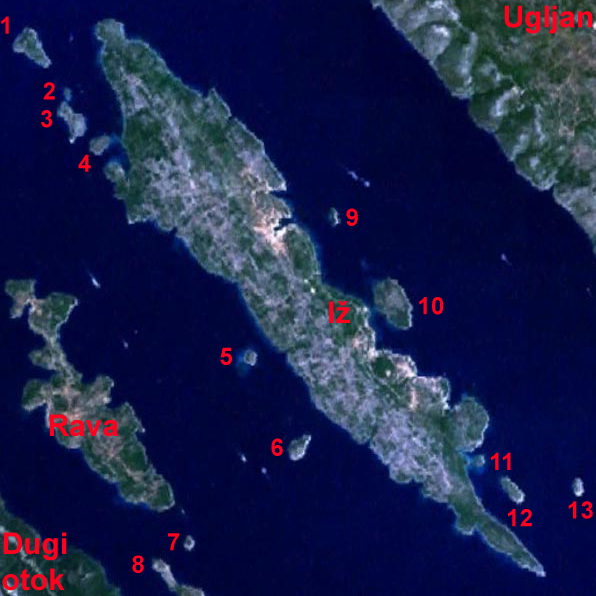

Nearby islets:

1. Veli otok
2. Mali otok
3. Srednji otok
4. Glurović
5. Kudica
6. Fulija
7. Maslinovac
8. Luški otok
9. Rutnjak
10. Knežak
11. Školjić
12. Tomešnjak
13. Mrtovnjak

== Bibliography ==
- Cvitanović, Alfonso (1989). Otok Iž [The island of Iž] (in Croatian). Mjesna zajednica Veli Iž.
- Marijan, Livio (2013). "Glagoljaška baština Velog Iža". Veli Iž: Glagoljaško pučko crkveno pjevanje u Zadarskoj nadbiskupiji (PDF). Pjevana baština. Zagreb: Institut za etnologiju i folkloristiku. pp. 56–90. ISBN 978-953-7528-06-5.
- M., D. (30 September 2018). "Nova stranica Nadbiskupije, stari podaci – rotacija župnika, tajna je za javnost". 057info (in Serbo-Croatian).
