= Pašman, Zadar County =

Pašman
- Municipality
- Općina Pašman; Municipality of Pašman
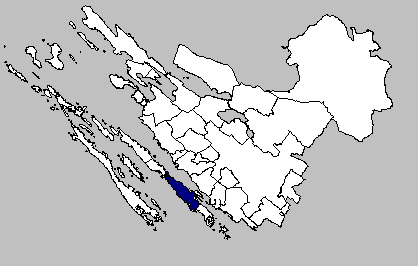
- Location of municipality within Zadar County
- Interactive map of Pašman
- Location of Pašman in Croatia
- Coordinates: 43°58′02″N 15°21′49″E
- Country: Croatia
- Region: Dalmatia
- County: Zadar County

Government
  - Municipal mayor: Krešimir Ćosić (HDZ)

Area
  - Municipality: 48.4 km^{2} (18.7 sq mi)
  - Urban: 11.7 km^{2} (4.5 sq mi)

Population (2021)
  - Municipality: 2,136
  - Density: 44.1/km^{2} (114/sq mi)
  - Urban: 346
  - Urban density: 29.6/km^{2} (76.6/sq mi)
- Time zone: UTC+1 (CET)
  - Summer (DST): UTC+2 (CEST)
- Postal code: 23262 Pašman
- Vehicle registration: ZD
- Website: opcinapasman.hr

Pašman is a village and a municipality in Zadar County, Croatia, located on the eponymous island, which it shares with the municipality of Tkon. According to the 2011 census, the municipality had 2,082 inhabitants, with 392 in Pašman itself.

Pašman was first mentioned in 1067 by the Croatian king Petar Krešimir IV. and under the name "Postimana".

== Demographics ==
In 2021, the municipality had 2,136 residents in the following 8 settlements:

- Banj, population 173
- Barotul, population 83
- Dobropoljana, population 278
- Kraj, population 253
- Mrljane, population 253
- Neviđane, population 353
- Pašman, population 346
- Ždrelac, population 397
Pašman: Population trends 1857–2021
v

population	1629	1816	1941	2112	2398	2723	2970	3075	3485	3402	2995	3000	2483	2597	2004	2082	2136
	1857	1869	1880	1890	1900	1910	1921	1931	1948	1953	1961	1971	1981	1991	2001	2011	2021

Sources: Croatian Bureau of Statistics publications

Historical population

Year	Pop.	±%
1857	1,629	—
1869	1,816	+11.5%
1880	1,941	+6.9%
1890	2,112	+8.8%
1900	2,398	+13.5%
1910	2,723	+13.6%
1921	2,970	+9.1%
1931	3,075	+3.5%
1948	3,485	+13.3%

Year	Pop.	±%
1953	3,402	−2.4%
1961	2,995	−12.0%
1971	3,000	+0.2%
1981	2,483	−17.2%
1991	2,597	+4.6%
2001	2,004	−22.8%
2011	2,082	+3.9%
2021	2,136	+2.6%

Source: DZS

== Gallery ==
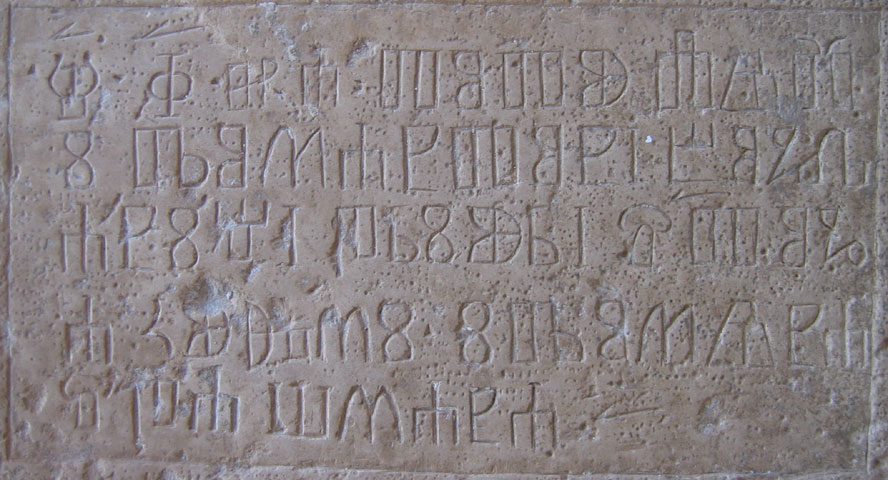
1517 inscription in Ćokovac monastery

== Notable people ==
Konstantin Božić (1774 – 1860), theologian and author

Klement Božić (1837 – 1893), journalist
