= Galešnjak =

Island in Croatia

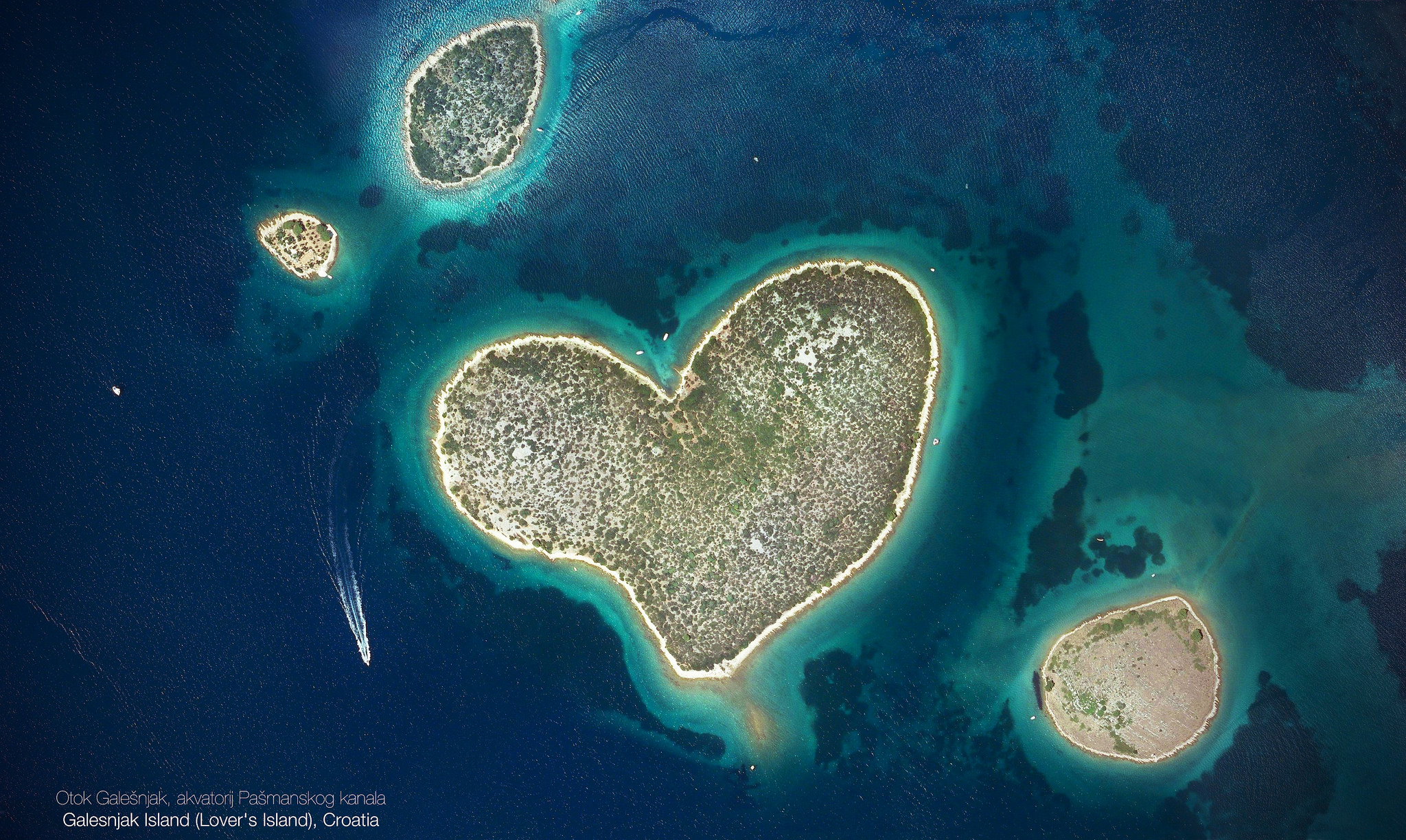
- Satellite view of island

- Location within Croatia
- Interactive map of Galešnjak

Geography
- Location: Adriatic Sea
- Coordinates: 43°58′41.24″N 15°23′1.14″E
- Area: 0.132 km^{2} (0.051 sq mi)

Administration
- Croatia

Demographics
- Population: 0

Galešnjak (also called Island of Love, Lover's Island, Otok za zaljubljene, Love Island) is located in the Pašman Canal of the Adriatic, between the islands of Pašman and the town of Turanj on mainland Croatia. It is one of the world's few naturally occurring heart-shaped objects.

The island has a surface area of 0.132 km^{2}, with its beach measuring 1.55 km in length. The island features two peaks, the highest of which is 36 m high above sea level.

Galešnjak is privately owned by the Jureško family who reside in Mrljane on the island of Pašman, and it contains only wild plants and trees as well as a colony of small rabbits and wild pigeons. Human activity recorded on this island is three known Illyrian burial mounds and remains of an ancient building's foundations.

The island's unusual shape was first recorded in the early 19th century by Napoleon's cartographer Charles-François Beautemps-Beaupré, who included it in his 1806 atlas of the Dalmatian coast (kept today at the National and University Library in Zagreb).

The island was highlighted on Google Earth in February 2009, which brought the island to worldwide attention.

Recent activity on the island has created two large scars across the heart, one spanning the island from a pier on the north to the south, and the other to the west of it where the olive and fig trees are planted.

The island provides facilities for engagements and small wedding parties. Daily private and organised tour departs from Tkon.
