= D503 road =

Road in Croatia

D503 state road

Route information
- Length: 16.2 km (10.1 mi)

Major junctions
- From: D27 in Šopot
- A1 in Benkovac interchange
- To: Biograd na Moru ferry port

Location
- Country: Croatia
- Counties: Zadar
- Major cities: Biograd na Moru

Highway system
- Highways in Croatia

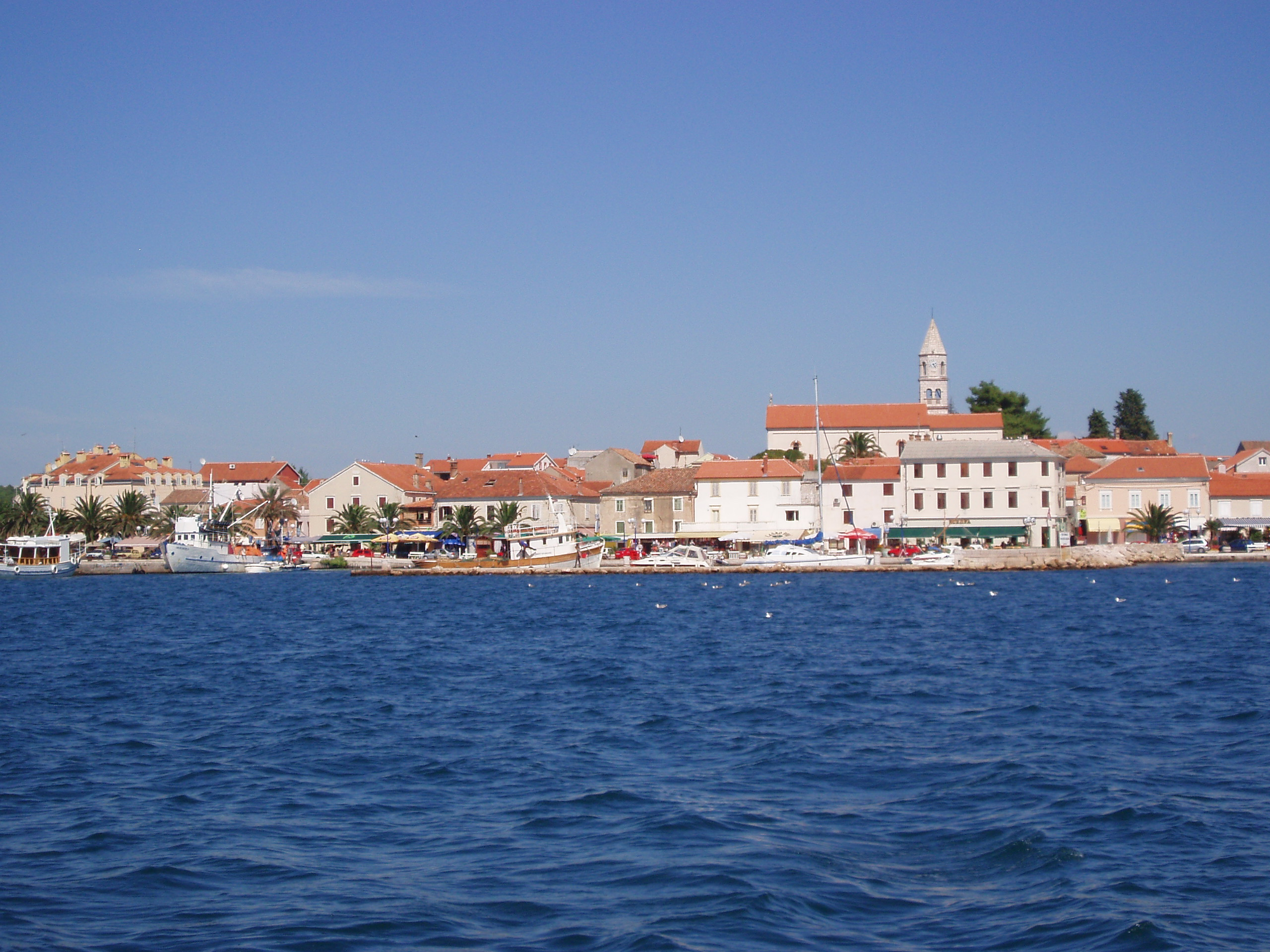
Biograd na Moru, at the southern terminus of D503

D503 is a state road in the northern Dalmatia region of Croatia that provides access from the A1 motorway's Benkovac interchange to the D8 state road, facilitating access from A1 motorway to Biograd na Moru and surrounding seaside resorts. The road is 16.2 km (10.1 mi) long.

The southern terminus of the road is located in Biograd na Moru ferry port, from where Jadrolinija ferries fly to Tkon island.

At its northern terminus, the road connects to D27 state road which serves as a parallel road to the A1 motorway, connecting to Gračac (to the north) facilitating a bypass of Maslenica bridges in case of strong winds preventing use of both of the bridges.

The road, as well as all other state roads in Croatia, is managed and maintained by Hrvatske ceste, a state-owned company.

== Traffic volume ==
Traffic is regularly counted and reported by Hrvatske ceste, operator of the road. Substantial variations between annual (AADT) and summer (ASDT) traffic volumes are attributed to the fact that the road connects a number of summer resorts to Croatian motorway network.

D503 traffic volume
Road	Counting site	AADT	ASDT	Notes
D503	4917 Kakma	3,299	5,807	Adjacent to Kakma.

== Road junctions ==
D503 major junctions/populated areas
Type	Slip roads/Notes
	Zapužane; D27 to Gračac (to the north) and to A1 motorway Benkovac interchange (to the south). The northern terminus of the road. Northbound D503 traffic defaults to northbound D27.
	Polača; Ž6047 to Tinj.
	Kakma; Ž6042 to Galovac and Vrana.
	Biograd na Moru; D8 to Sveti Filip i Jakov to the north, and Pakoštane to the south.
	Biograd na Moru ferry port Ferry access to Tkon, Pašman island (D110). The southern terminus of the road.
