= Mali Ždrelac =

Strait in the Adriatic Sea in Croatia

Coordinates: 44°00′46″N 15°15′01″E

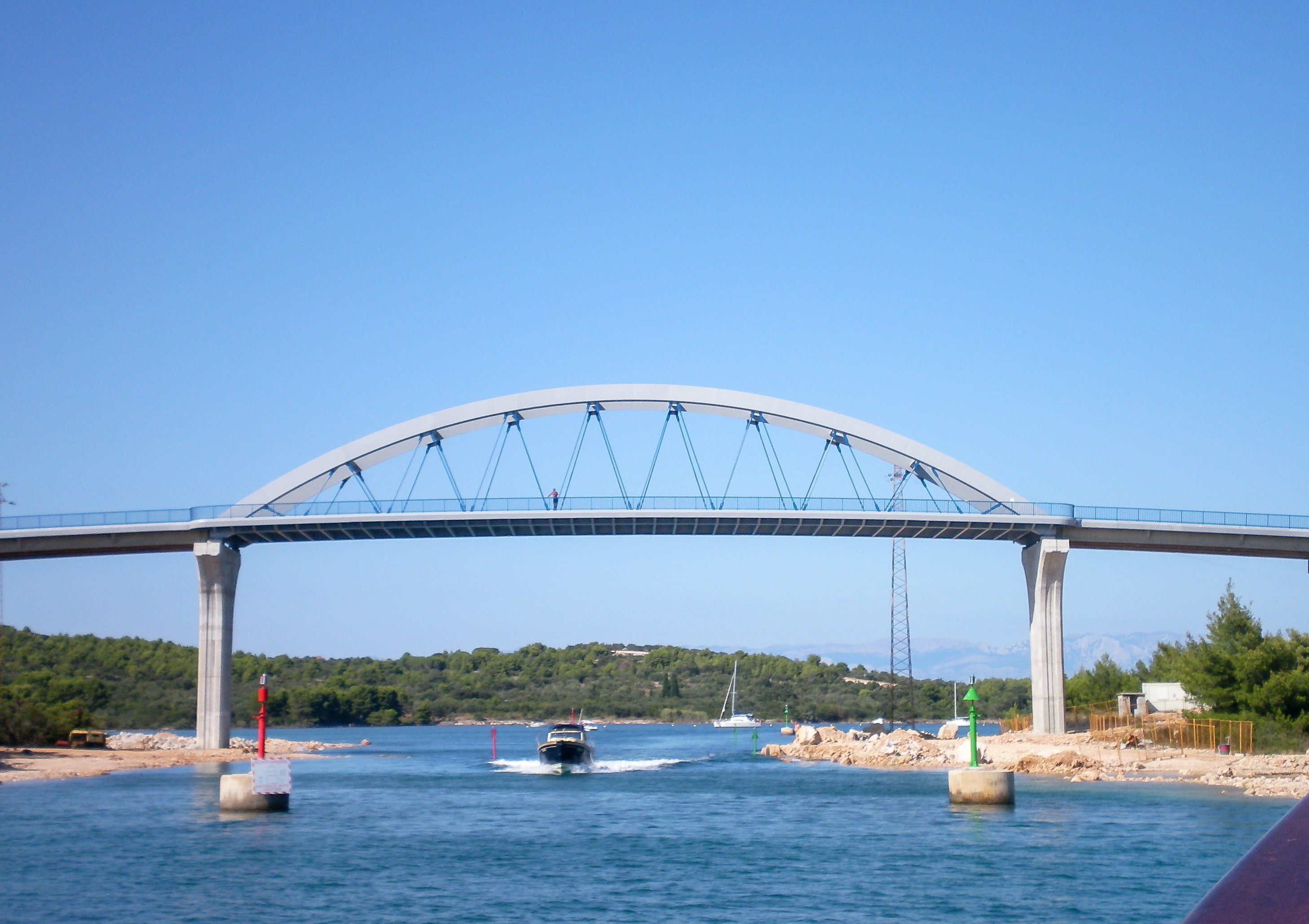

Mali Ždrelac is a small strait in the Adriatic Sea located between the Croatian islands of Ugljan and Pašman. State road D110 passes over the strait via the Ždrelac Bridge which spans the entire strait. There is also a village called Ždrelac on the island of Pašman overlooking the strait.
