= Konstantin Božić =

Konstantin Božić also: Boxich; Constantinus de Pasmano (2 December 1774 – 8 April 1860), was a Croatian theologian and author.

== Early life and education ==
Konstantin Božić was born on December 2, in 1774, in the village of Kraj, in the southeast of the island of Pašman. He started his studies in philosophy and theology at the Franciscan monastery of St. Francis Assisi in Zadar after growing up close to the Franciscan monastery in Kraj on Pašman where he received his initial education. He joined the Franciscan order at the Zadar monastery in 1794. Afterwards he traveled to Rome and Perugia in Italy to study philosophy and theology following his ordination in 1799.

== Teaching and provincial work ==
Following his graduation in Italy, Konstantin Božić spent twenty years teaching theology and philosophy in the Glagolitic Seminary "Zmajević" and also Zadar Franciscan College.

Božić served as a prior of the Franciscan monastery of St. Anthony in Poljud (Split) 1823 – 1824), and also three times as a provincial superior of the Franciscan Province of St. Jerome of Dalmatia (and Istria): 1824 – 1827, 1833 – 1836, and 1839 – 1843. In his capacity as provincial, he made significant contributions to increase the province's ministerial's number and cultural improvement. Also, he mandated that all applicants enroll in public schools. As a priest, he was a talented and in-demand preacher. He died on April 8, 1860 in Zadar.

== Writings ==
Konstantin Božić authored numerous works: theological theses in Latin language (Ex theologia selectae propositiones ... Jadrae 1804; Ex tractatu De Deo uno selectae propositiones. Jadrae (1804); Theses theologicae habitae Jadrae in ecclesia S. Francisci. Jadrae 1810), also sporadic addresses in Italian language, including historical treatises, notably on pope John IV, and biography of Oktavijan Janković Spader (Cronologia inedita di tutti i Conventi della Provincia; Lettera circolare. Zara 1840; Orazione recitata ... nell’occasione della solenne professione della monaca clarissa suor M. Costanza Midenjak. Venezia 1841.; Orazione sacra... nella occasione della solenne professione di cingue suoi chierici. Zara 1842.; Ragionamento sacro ... Zara 1843.; Biografia del P. Ottavio Jancovich, detto Spader di Zara. Zara 1846.; Biografia del Sommo Pontefice Giovanni IV, nato a Zara. Zara 1855.; Ragionamento sopra l’onesta e probita cristiana cattolica. Zara 1856.; Ragionamento storico-critico sopra la patria del massimo Dottore S. Girolamo. Zara 1856). In 1845, he contributed to the periodical "La Dalmazia".

In Croatian language theologian and writer Božić composed treatises on church history, sermons, and eulogies. In the periodical "Zora dalmatinska", Božić produced a series of essays titled The Liturgy of Slavonic St. Štievnica (Liturgy) ("Uređenje S. Štievnice (Liturgia) Slovinske") between 1844 and 1846. In those writtings he writes on the Bernardin of Split Lectionary defends the Slavonic liturgy, citing the philological and historical justifications for the Old Church Slavonic language's introduction into liturgy in Dalmatia. His Lenten sermons titled Slavonic narratives ("Pripovisti slovinske"), and other panegyrics in Croatian were preserved in manuscript (in the Archives of the Franciscan Monastery in Zadar).

== See also ==
- Klement Božić (1837 – 1893), Croatian journalist from Pašman
