= Kukljica =

- Village
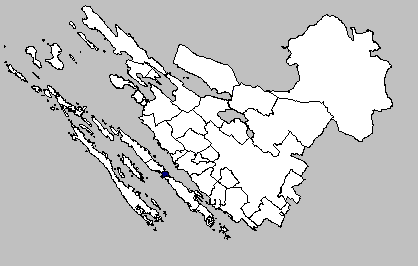
- Kukljica municipality within Zadar County
- Interactive map of Kukljica
- Location of Kukljica in Croatia
- Coordinates: 44°02′06″N 15°14′47″E
- Country: Croatia
- Region: Dalmatia
- County: Zadar County

Area
  - Village: 6.8 km^{2} (2.6 sq mi)
  - Urban: 6.8 km^{2} (2.6 sq mi)

Population (2021)
  - Village: 628
  - Density: 92/km^{2} (240/sq mi)
  - Urban: 628
  - Urban density: 92/km^{2} (240/sq mi)
- Postal code: 23271
- Website: opcina-kukljica.hr

Kukljica is a village on the island of Ugljan in Croatia, and the only settlement in the eponymous municipality. According to the 2011 census, there are 714 inhabitants, 98% which are Croats. The area of Kukljica also includes the islets of Mišnjak, Karantunić, Bisage and Golac with a total area of 6.9 square kilometers.

== Demographics ==
Kukljica: Population trends 1857–2021
v

population	688	780	839	1078	1310	1345	1537	1457	1563	1612	1473	1375	716	868	650	714	628
	1857	1869	1880	1890	1900	1910	1921	1931	1948	1953	1961	1971	1981	1991	2001	2011	2021

Sources: Croatian Bureau of Statistics publications

== Attractions ==
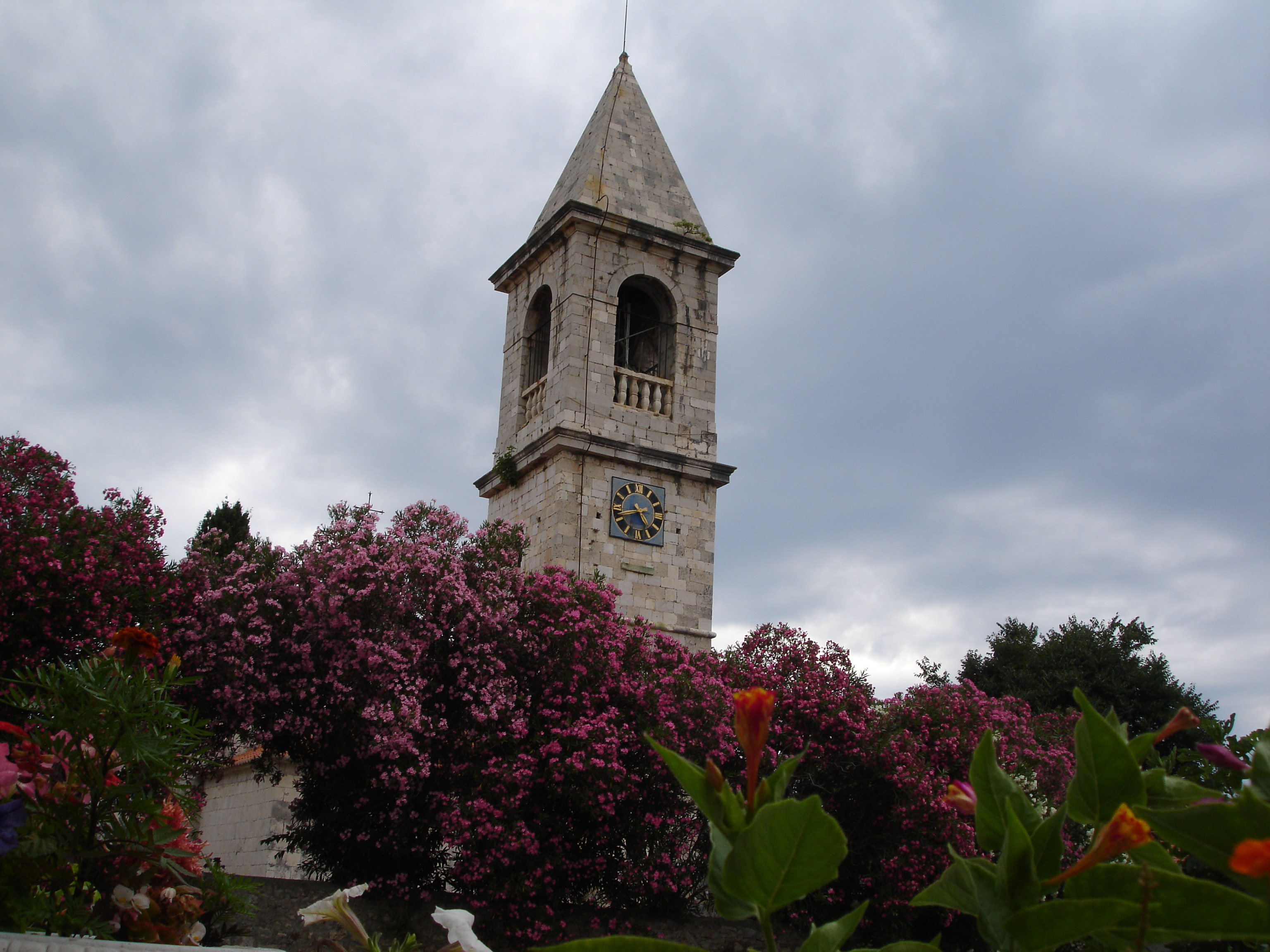
Church steeple in Kukljica

Kukljica is a tourist and fishing town on the southeastern side of the island of Ugljan close to the Zdrelac Strait, also known as the “doorway to Telašćica Nature Park and Kornati National Park”. It has 52 km2 and 75 km of coastline abounding with bays. Ugljan faces Zadar from which it is separated by the Zadar Channel which is only 3 NM wide. It is well-connected with the mainland by ferryboats. A bridge at the crossing Ždrelac connects Ugljan with the island of Pašman. The old part of Kukljica consists of Mediterranean architecture with orange tile roofs and is separated from the green peninsula on which the settlement is situated by a large natural inlet and port. The sandy beaches of Sabuša, Kostanj, Zelena Punta, and Jelenica stretch to both sides of the island in the shade of centennial pinewood. In the haven Kostanj there is a valuable historical monument, the restored old Christian church of St. Jerome from the 13th century.

Every year a traditional procession to the shrine of Our Lady of Snow, which has been taking place here since 1514, is held on 5 August, in memory of the day when, according to legend, it snowed five centuries earlier. The statue is accompanied by a procession of hundreds of boats of all sizes encircling the boat that carries the "Lady of Snow" statue. Festival activities include tug-of-war, donkey races, climbing a greased pole to get to a prosciutto that is hung at the top. Along with a concert, there are many vendors selling goods, especially food carts selling traditional palačinke.

Kukljica is home to the Bačić, Bačoka, Benić, Bilan, Blagdan, Jaša, Martinović, Meštrić, Milić, and Vulin families.

== Climate ==
Between 1999 and 2018, the highest temperature recorded at the local weather station was 38.3 °C (100.9 °F), on 22 August 2000. The coldest temperature was −5.8 °C (21.6 °F), on 26 January 2000.

== Politics ==
=== Minority councils and representatives ===
Directly elected minority councils and representatives are tasked with consulting tasks for the local or regional authorities in which they are advocating for minority rights and interests, integration into public life and participation in the management of local affairs. At the 2023 Croatian national minorities councils and representatives elections Albanians of Croatia fulfilled legal requirements to elect 10 members minority councils of the Municipality of Kukljica but the elections were not held due to the absence of candidatures.
