= Califfi Castle =

Coordinates: 44.14°N 15.07°E

Califfi Castle (Croatian: Dvorac Califfi) is a 17th-century castle on the Croatian island of Ugljan (Dalmatia), in the town of the same name. The castle was built by the Califfi family in the 17th century. The Bercich (in Croatian Berčić or Brčić) family from Zara (Zadar) acted as stewards of the castle, and the castle eventually took on their name. More recently the castle has been restored and carries the name Dvor Krešimir Ćosić after the former Croatian basketball star.
