= Kakma =

Coordinates: 44°00′N 15°30′E

- Village
- Interactive map of Kakma
- Country: Croatia
- County: Zadar County
- Municipality: Polača

Area
  - Total: 2.9 km^{2} (1.1 sq mi)

Population (2021)
  - Total: 177
  - Density: 61/km^{2} (160/sq mi)
- Time zone: UTC+1 (CET)
  - Summer (DST): UTC+2 (CEST)

Kakma is a village in Croatia. It is connected by the D503 highway.

== Notable natives and residents ==
- Slobodan Uzelac
