= Banj, Croatia =

Coordinates: 44°00′04″N 15°17′48″E

Banj
- Village
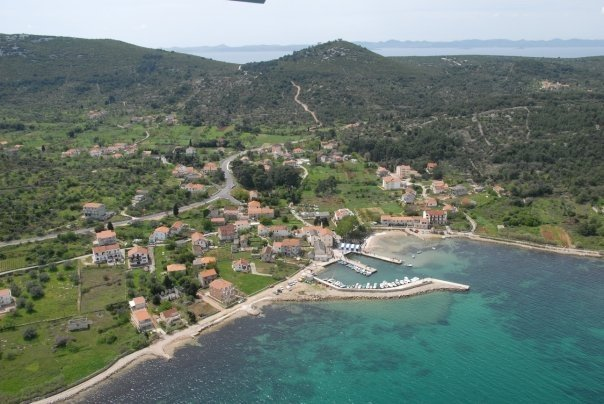
- Interactive map of Banj
- Country: Croatia
- County: Zadar County
- Municipality: Pašman

Area
  - Total: 4.5 km^{2} (1.7 sq mi)

Population (2021)
  - Total: 173
  - Density: 38/km^{2} (100/sq mi)
- Time zone: UTC+1 (CET)
  - Summer (DST): UTC+2 (CEST)

Banj is a village in Croatia. It is connected by the D110 highway.
