= Neviđane =

Coordinates: 43°59′N 15°20′E

- Village
- Interactive map of Neviđane
- Country: Croatia
- County: Zadar County
- Municipality: Pašman

Area
  - Total: 8.4 km^{2} (3.2 sq mi)

Population (2021)
  - Total: 353
  - Density: 42/km^{2} (110/sq mi)
- Time zone: UTC+1 (CET)
  - Summer (DST): UTC+2 (CEST)

Neviđane is a village in Croatia. It is connected by the D110 highway.
