= Muline =

Coordinates: 44°08′N 15°05′E

- Village
- Interactive map of Muline
- Country: Croatia
- Time zone: UTC+1 (CET)
  - Summer (DST): UTC+2 (CEST)

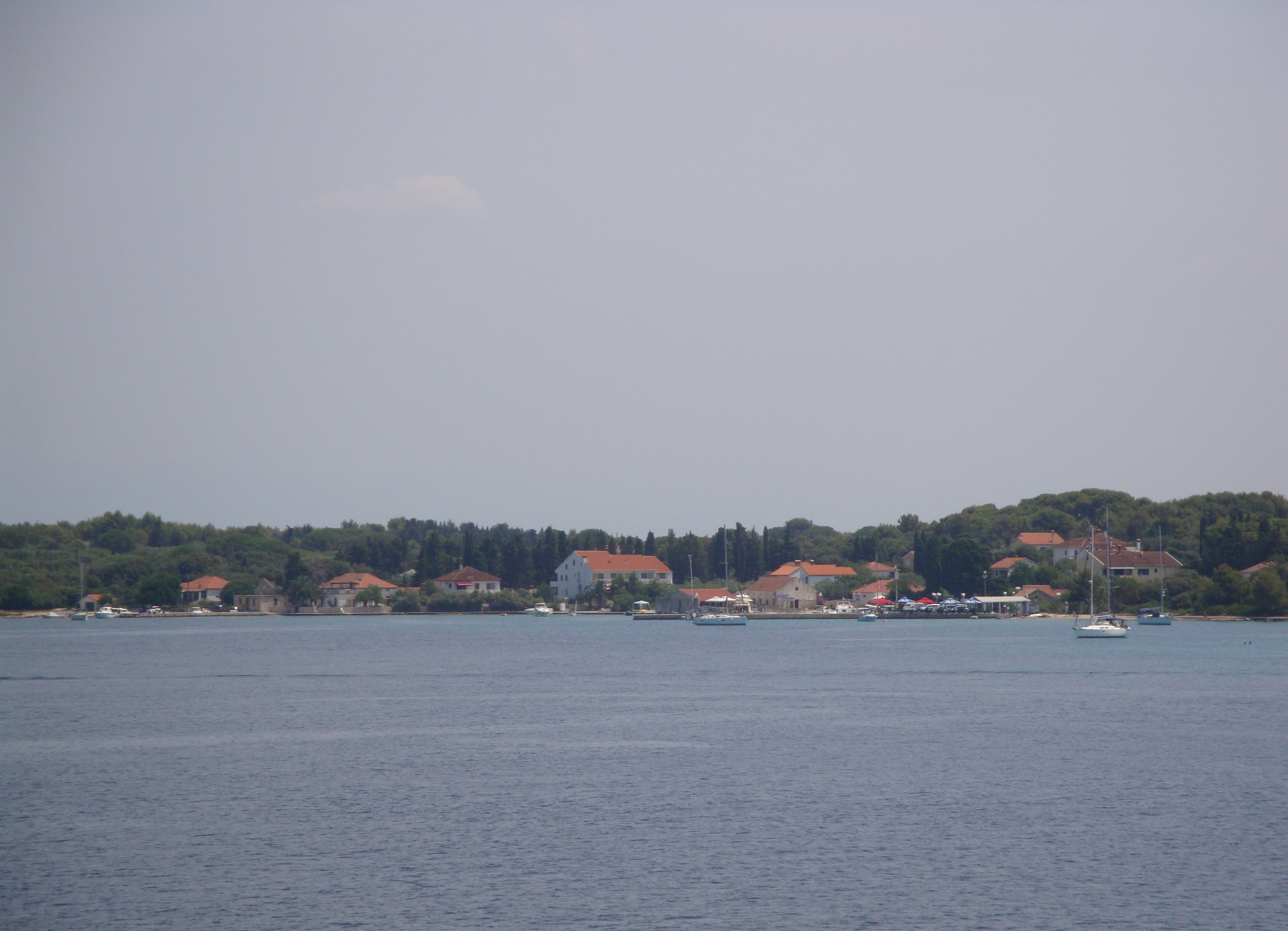
view of Muline

Muline is a port village on the island Ugljan in Croatia, municipality of Preko in Zadar county. It is connected by the D110 highway and by ferry. In Roman times it was important center of the olive oil production where most famous oil in antiquity (Liburnian oil) was produced.
