= Lukoran =

Coordinates: 44°06′N 15°10′E

- Village
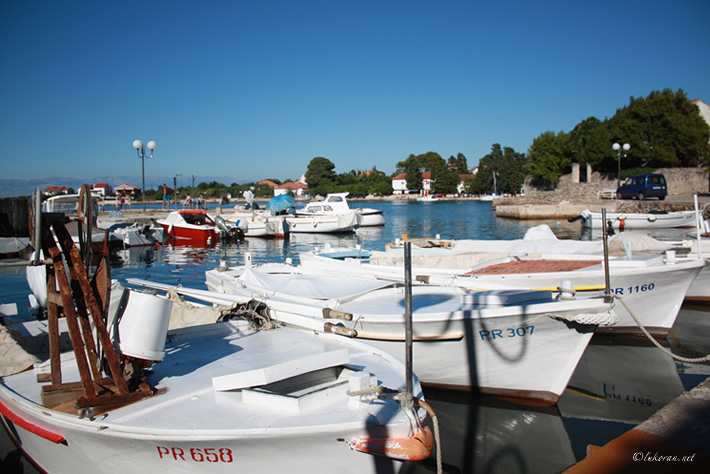
- Primorje, a small boat port in Lukoran

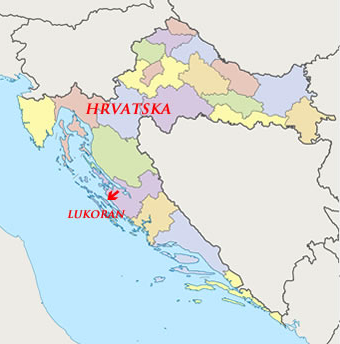
- Location of Lukoran in Croatia

- Location within Croatia
- Country: Croatia
- County: Zadar County

Area
  - Total: 9.8 km^{2} (3.8 sq mi)

Population (2021)
  - Total: 478
  - Density: 49/km^{2} (130/sq mi)
- Time zone: UTC+1 (CET)
  - Summer (DST): UTC+2
- Postal code: 23274
- Area code: 023

Lukoran is a village in Croatia, located on the Adriatic island of Ugljan overlooking at the Zadar peninsula. It is connected with other island villages with the State route D110. Lukoran was mentioned in the year 1068. The name Lukoran originates from 6th or 7th century Rome (Laucaranus) since the name uses Latin suffix -ANUS added to the Roman nomina gentilia which originates from this time period. It was the birthplace of Šimun Klimantović* (Klemenović, around 1460–1540), a Glagolitic writer, as he said for himself in his chronicle of the Glagolitic (1511). His two collections are kept in Zagreb and in the Russian National Library in St. Petersburg. He wrote down The Lament of the Blessed Virgin in his ritual manuals from 1512 and 1514 which is among the older sources of Glagolitic singing.

Lukoran is a village mainly active in fishing, agriculture and tourism. It has four settlements: Mali Lukoran, Turkija, Veli Lukoran and Prkljug. The highest peak of the island is Šćah (286 m).

Lukoran has 478 inhabitants. In 1075, it was mentioned as the property of the Zadar Benedictines.

== Bibliography ==
- Modrić, Oliver (2025-01-27). "Prijenos i zbrinjavanje gradiva župnih arhiva u Arhiv Zadarske nadbiskupije" [Transfer and storage of materials of the parish archives to the Archives of the Archdiocese of Zadar]. Vjesnik dalmatinskih arhiva (in Serbo-Croatian). 5: 109–124. doi:10.58565/vda.5.1.5. eISSN 2806-8459.
