= Kraj, Pašman =

Coordinates: 43°56′24″N 15°23′24″E

Kraj
- Village
- Interactive map of Kraj
- Country: Croatia
- County: Zadar County
- Municipality: Pašman

Area
  - Total: 6.8 km^{2} (2.6 sq mi)

Population (2021)
  - Total: 253
  - Density: 37/km^{2} (96/sq mi)
- Time zone: UTC+1 (CET)
  - Summer (DST): UTC+2 (CEST)

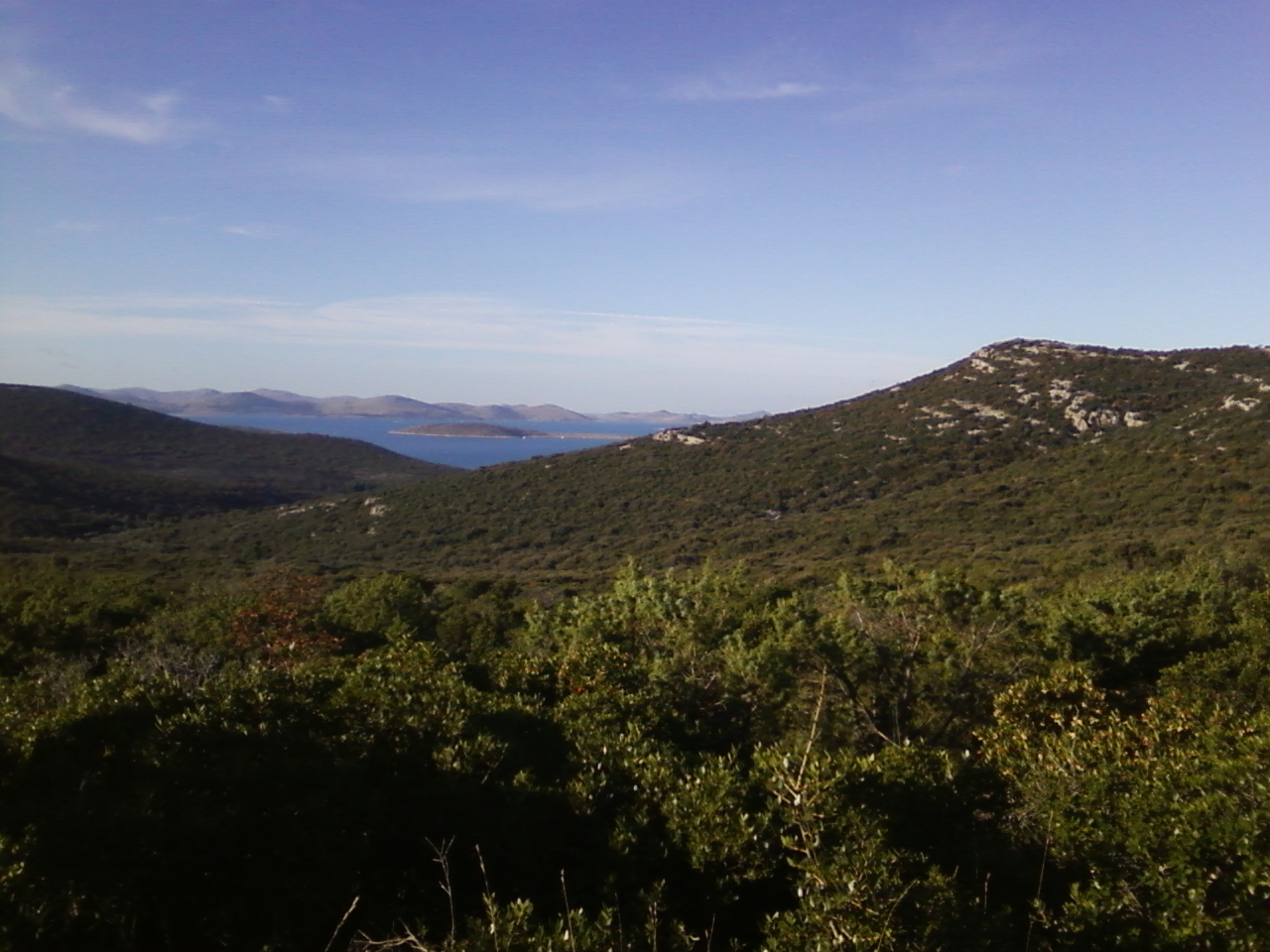
View to Kornati from Pasman - panoramio

Kraj is a village located in the southeast part of the island of Pašman, 3 km south of the village of Pašman, 300 m from the coast of the Pašman Channel in Dalmatia, Croatia.

The village features a Gothic Franciscan monastery with a church from 1392. The gate leading to the monastery yard was restored in Baroque style in 1669. The church was also reconstructed in Baroque style, and at the front is a Renaissance relief of St. Jerome from 1554.

== Sources ==
- "Osnutak franjevačkog samostana na Pašmanu 1392. godine" [The founding of a Franciscan monastery on Pašman (1392)]. Prilozi povijesti umjetnosti u Dalmaciji (in Croatian). 1992.
