= Barotul =

Settlement in Zadar County, Croatia

- Settlement
- Interactive map of Barotul
- Location of Barotul in Croatia
- Coordinates: 43°56′49″N 15°22′19″E
- Country: Croatia
- County: Zadar County
- Municipality: Pašman

Area
  - Total: 0.9 km^{2} (0.35 sq mi)

Population (2021)
  - Total: 83
  - Density: 92/km^{2} (240/sq mi)
- Time zone: UTC+1 (CET)
  - Summer (DST): UTC+2 (CEST)
- Postal code: 23212 Tkon

Barotul is a settlement in the Municipality of Pašman in Croatia. In 2021, its population was 83.
