= Ugljan =

Croatian island

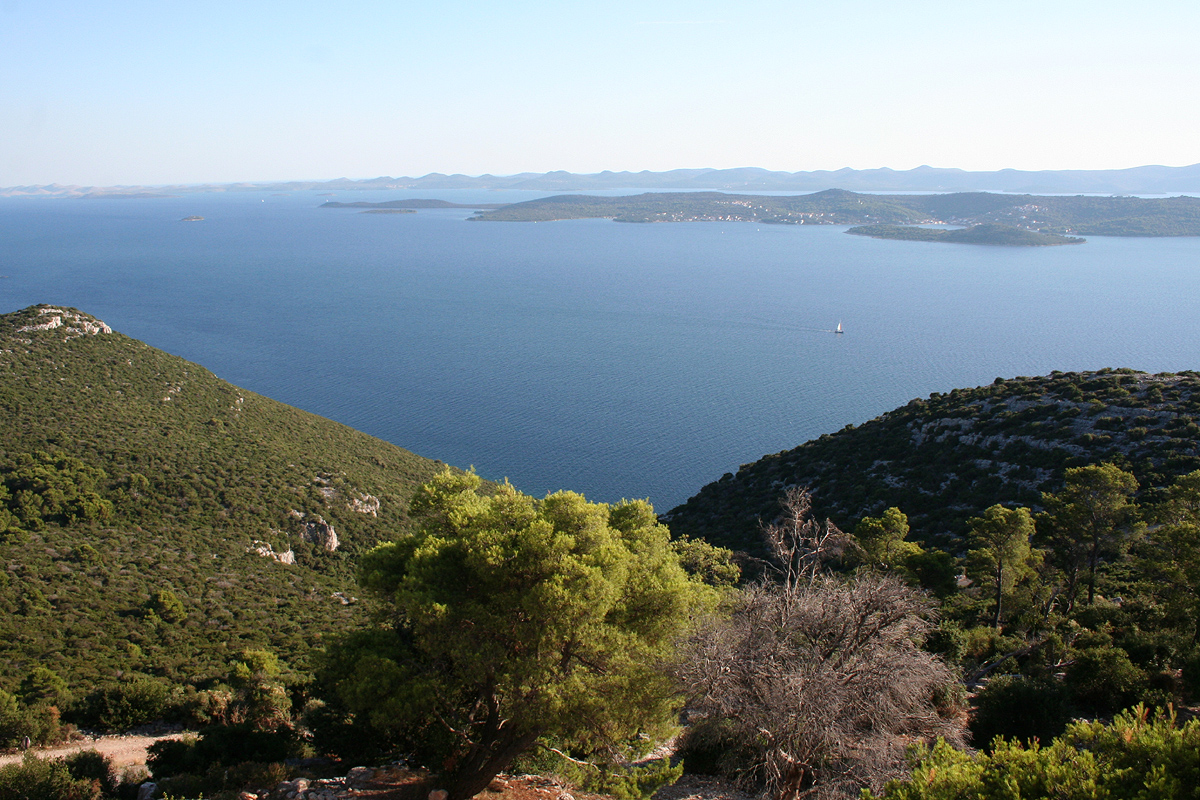
- Location in the Adriatic
- Location in Croatia
- Other name: Ugliano (Italian)

Geography
- Location: Adriatic Sea
- Coordinates: 44°5′N 15°10′E
- Area: 50.2 km^{2} (19.4 sq mi)
- Highest elevation: 286.1 m (938.6 ft)
- Highest point: Šćah

Administration
- Croatia
- County: Zadar County

Demographics
- Population: 6,049 (2011)
- Pop. density: 120.49/km^{2} (312.07/sq mi)
- Languages: Croatian, Italian, Venetian (historically)

Ugljan (pronounced [ûɡʎan]) is an island in northern Dalmatia, Croatia, and the first in the Zadar Archipelago. It is located northwest of the island of Pašman and southeast of the islands of Rivanj and Sestrunj. Separated from the mainland by the Zadar Channel, it is connected with the island of Pašman by the Ždrelac Bridge spanning over the Ždrelac Strait. Area 50.21 km^{2} (19.39 sq mi), population 6,049 (2011), length 22 km (14 mi), width up to 3.8 km (2.4 mi).

== Description ==
The island was first mentioned under its present name in 1325. The continuity of population dates back to the Neolithic. Densely populated during the Roman period, in particular its north-western parts, where ample ruins of ancient buildings have been found. There is also evidence of Roman centuriation which can still be found on the island. The present settlements date back to the Middle Ages. It is also home to Califfi Castle. In 16th and 17th centuries the island saw multiple waves of refugees from Ravni Kotari, who settled the island fleeing from the Ottomans.

The limestone part of the island is covered predominantly with macchia, while the dolomite area is occupied by farmland. Larger coves are Muline in the northwest, Lamjana Vela and Lamjana Mala in the southeast. The eastern coast descends mildly to the sea, characterized by many indents.

Ugljan is one of the most densely populated Croatian islands. All settlements (Preko, Ugljan, Lukoran, Sutomišćica, Poljana, Kali, Ošljak and Kukljica) are situated along the coast of the cultivated eastern side of the island. Major crops include olives, figs and vines. The olive oil produced on Ugljan is considered the best olive oil in Croatia. Set high above Preko are the ruins of St. Michael Fort. Ugljan has a regional road connected by the bridge with the regional road running along the island of Pašman. Ferry port in Preko; ferry connections with Zadar.

== See also ==
- Kornati

== Bibliography ==
- Šebečić, Berislav; Šinkovec, Boris; Trutin, Mladen (1999-12-04). "Donjopaleogenski boksiti Vinišća, Ugljana, Silbe i Oliba" [Lower Paleogene Bauxites of Vinišće, Ugljan, Silba and Olib]. Rudarsko-geološko-naftni zbornik (in Serbo-Croatian). 11 (1): 17–26. ISSN 0353-4529.
- Magaš, Damir; Faričić, Josip (2000). "Geografske osnove razvitka otoka Ugljana" [Geographical Bases of the Development of the Ugljan Island] (PDF). Geoadria (in Croatian). 5 (1): 49–92. doi:10.15291/geoadria.154.
