= Ždrelac =

Coordinates: 44°01′N 15°16′E

- Village
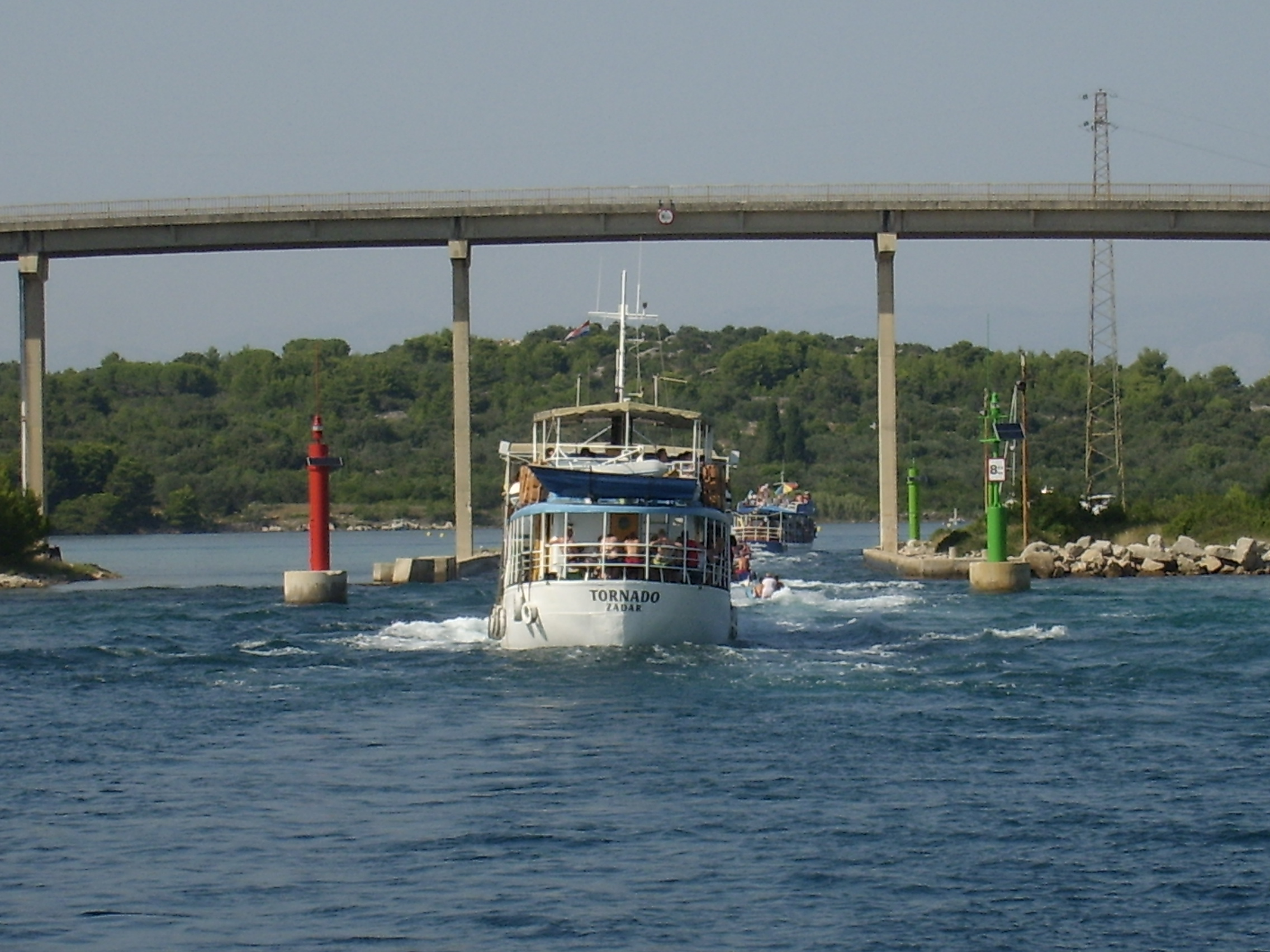
- Interactive map of Ždrelac
- Country: Croatia

Area
  - Total: 2.1 sq mi (5.5 km^{2})

Population (2021)
  - Total: 397
  - Density: 190/sq mi (72/km^{2})
- Time zone: UTC+1 (CET)
  - Summer (DST): UTC+2 (CEST)

Ždrelac is a village on the island of Pašman in Croatia connected by the D110 highway. At its northernmost tip, it is also connected to the island of Ugljan via the Ždrelac Bridge.
