= Dobropoljana =

Coordinates: 44°00′N 15°19′E

- Village
- Interactive map of Dobropoljana
- Country: Croatia
- Region: Dalmatia
- County: Zadar County

Area
  - Total: 2.3 sq mi (6.0 km^{2})

Population (2021)
  - Total: 278
  - Density: 120/sq mi (46/km^{2})
- Time zone: UTC+1 (CET)
  - Summer (DST): UTC+2 (CEST)

Dobropoljana is a village in Croatia on a cove on the north side of the island of Pašman, Zadar County. It is located below the highest peak on the island (Bokolj, 274 m). Chief occupations are farming, olive growing, fishing and seafaring. The marina is protected from south and west winds and provides good shelter for smaller yachts. First mentioned in 1270, Dobropoljana was intensely populated in the 17th century by refugees from the Zadar hinterland. It is connected by the D110 highway to the rest of the island of Pašman.

Krešimir Ćosić, a Croatian basketball player and coach, was originally from Dobropoljana.
