= Kali, Croatia =

Kali
- Municipality
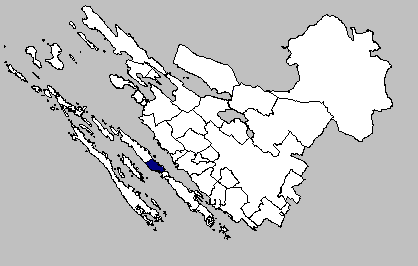
- Kali municipality within the Zadar County
- Interactive map of Kali
- Location of Kali in Croatia
- Coordinates: 44°03′46″N 15°12′20″E
- Country: Croatia
- Region: Dalmatia
- County: Zadar County

Government
  - Municipal Mayor: Marko Kolega

Area
  - Municipality: 9.4 km^{2} (3.6 sq mi)
  - Urban: 9.4 km^{2} (3.6 sq mi)

Population (2021)
  - Municipality: 1,585
  - Density: 170/km^{2} (440/sq mi)
  - Urban: 1,585
  - Urban density: 170/km^{2} (440/sq mi)
- Website: opcina-kali.hr

Kali (Croatian pronunciation: [kâːli]) is a village and the only settlement in the eponymous municipality in Croatia on Ugljan island in Zadar County. In the 2011 census, there were 1,638 inhabitants, 99.39% of whom were Croats. Kali was mentioned in historical documents for the first time in 1299, but archaeological finds on the Orjak hill prove that life existed in this area since prehistoric times.

== Name ==
The settlement's name is likely derived from cale, a Celtic word for port.

== Demographics ==
Kali: Population trends 1857–2021
v

population	558	626	797	982	1221	1482	1594	2061	2281	2305	2251	2405	1829	2245	1731	1638	1585
	1857	1869	1880	1890	1900	1910	1921	1931	1948	1953	1961	1971	1981	1991	2001	2011	2021

Sources: Croatian Bureau of Statistics publications

== Attractions ==
Kali is a fishing town with a Mediterranean feeling. The old central part of the town was founded on a hillock around St. Lovre's (St. Lawrence) Church, the patron saint of the town. The famed fishermen's festival takes place under the saint's auspices every year in August.

== Bibliography ==
- Magaš, Damir; Faričić, Josip (2000). "Geografske osnove razvitka otoka Ugljana" [Geographical Foundations of the Development of the Island of Ugljan]. Geoadria (in Croatian). 5 (1): 49–92. doi:10.15291/geoadria.154.
