= Sutomišćica =

Coordinates: 44°06′N 15°11′E

Sutomišćica Santa Eufemia
- Village
- Interactive map of Sutomišćica
- Country: Croatia

Area
  - Total: 1.4 sq mi (3.7 km^{2})

Population (2021)
  - Total: 380
  - Density: 270/sq mi (100/km^{2})
- Time zone: UTC+1 (CET)
  - Summer (DST): UTC+2 (CEST)

Sutomišćica is a village in Croatia, on the eastern side of the island of Ugljan in the region of Dalmatia. Sutomišćica, which was already inhabited in ancient times, is situated in a beautiful bay of the same name, about 3 km from Preko. On the opposite side of the bay a new marina has been built. The fishing village is one of the smaller places on the island. In addition to the tourist season, the locals are mostly traditionally involved in olive cultivation and fishing. Orchards in Sutomišćica contain mainly "Puljka" and "Oštrica" olive varieties.

The church of St. Euphemia (Crkva sv. Eufemije) in Sutomišćica is first mentioned in the beginning of the 14th century, while the church of St. Grgur was built in the 12th century. Sutomišćica was named after the church of St. Euphemia during the middle ages.

Sutomišćica is also known for the baroque villa 'Lantana' from 1686. On the southeastern edge of the village stands the well-known former country house of the Zadar aristocratic Lantana family. The building, which used to be in the hands of the locally well-known Blasić family since the end of the 1940’s, was built in the Baroque architectural style and served as the Lantana family's summer home. The building, designed in the style of a Venetian country house, is located in the center of a large rectangular garden. Until the fall of Venice in 1797, the ceremony of handing over the duties of the Venetian Doge, Venice's highest elected official, to Dalmatia and Albania took place in this mansion.

Sutomišćica has 336 inhabitants.

== Bibliography ==
- Modrić, Oliver (2025-01-27). "Prijenos i zbrinjavanje gradiva župnih arhiva u Arhiv Zadarske nadbiskupije" [Transfer and storage of materials of the parish archives to the Archives of the Archdiocese of Zadar]. Vjesnik dalmatinskih arhiva (in Serbo-Croatian). 5: 109–124. doi:10.58565/vda.5.1.5. eISSN 2806-8459.
