= Ugljan, Preko =

Coordinates: 44°08′N 15°06′E

Ugljan
- Village
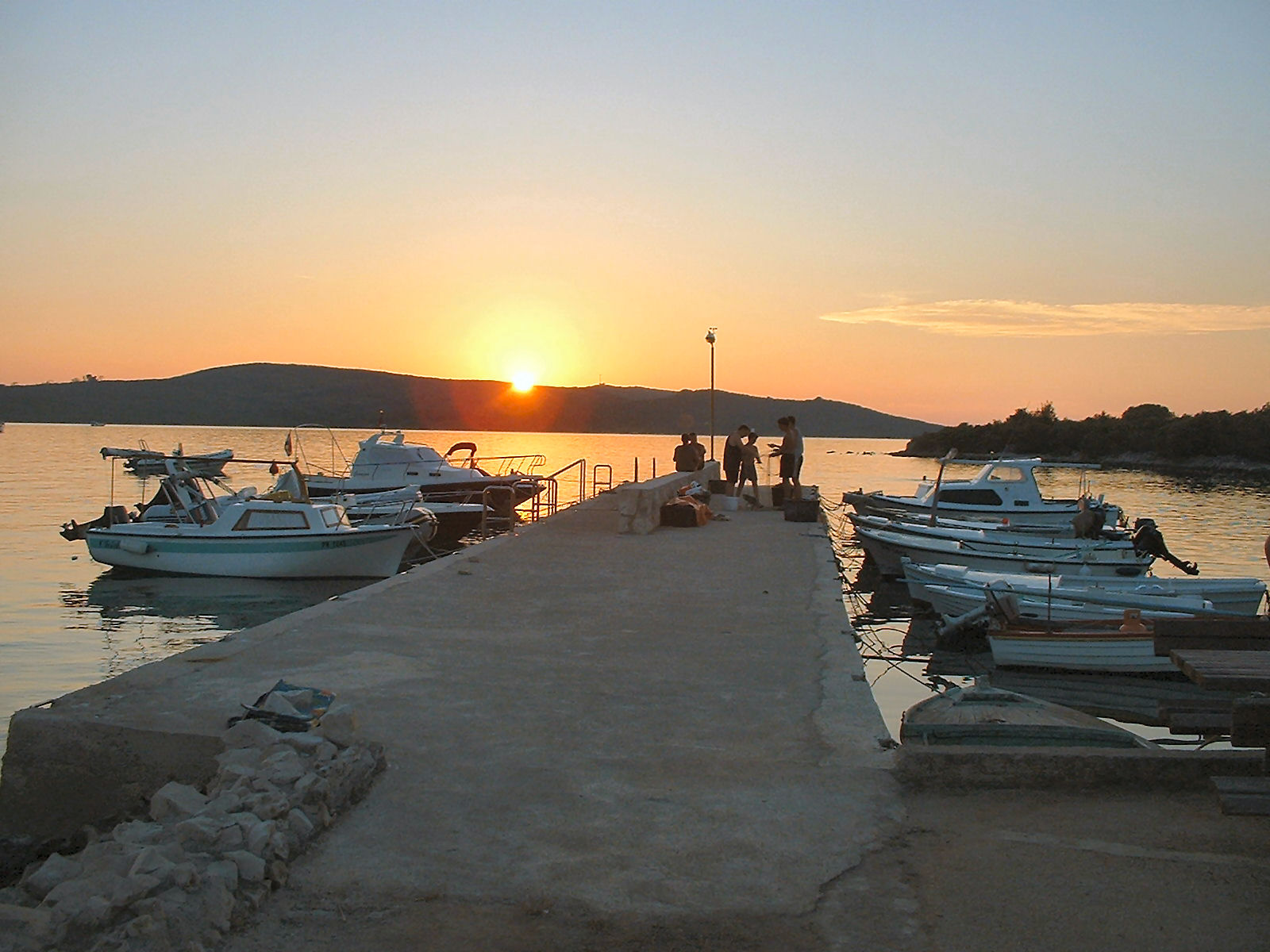
- Interactive map of Ugljan
- Country: Croatia
- County: Zadar County
- Municipality: Preko

Area
  - Total: 5.1 sq mi (13.3 km^{2})

Population (2021)
  - Total: 1,024
  - Density: 199/sq mi (77.0/km^{2})
- Time zone: UTC+1 (CET)
  - Summer (DST): UTC+2 (CEST)
- Postal code: 23275
- Vehicle registration: ZD

Ugljan is a village on an island also named Ugljan, in Preko municipality, Zadar County, Croatia. It is connected by the D110 highway. According to the 2011 census, it has a population of 1,278. Ugljan has nine hamlets: Čeprljanda, Lučino Selo, Batalaža, Sušica, Gornje Selo, Muline, Guduće, Fortoština and Varoš. On the cape there is an old Franciscan monastery from 1430 with Gothic church from 1447.

Ugljan has a volunteer fire department, the DVD "Psihijatrijska bolnica Ugljan".

== Bibliography ==
- Modrić, Oliver (2025-01-27). "Prijenos i zbrinjavanje gradiva župnih arhiva u Arhiv Zadarske nadbiskupije" [Transfer and storage of materials of the parish archives to the Archives of the Archdiocese of Zadar]. Vjesnik dalmatinskih arhiva (in Serbo-Croatian). 5: 109–124. doi:10.58565/vda.5.1.5. eISSN 2806-8459.
