= Ždrelac Bridge =

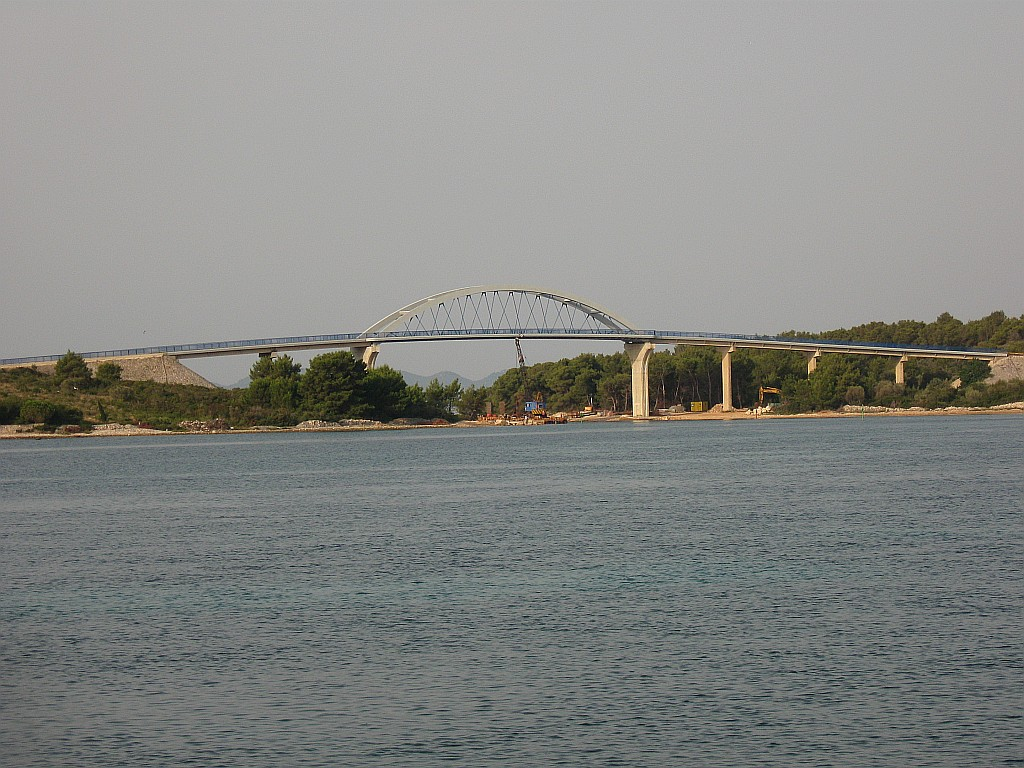
- Ždrelac bridge in July 2011
- Coordinates: 44°00′52″N 15°15′05″E
- Carries: Road vehicles
- Locale: Southern Croatia
- Official name: Most Ždrelac
- Maintained by: Hrvatske ceste

Characteristics
- Design: through arch bridge
- Total length: 210 m
- Width: 11.8 m
- Longest span: 68 m
- Clearance below: 16 m

History
- Opened: 1972

Statistics
- Toll: no

Location
- Interactive map of Ždrelac Bridge

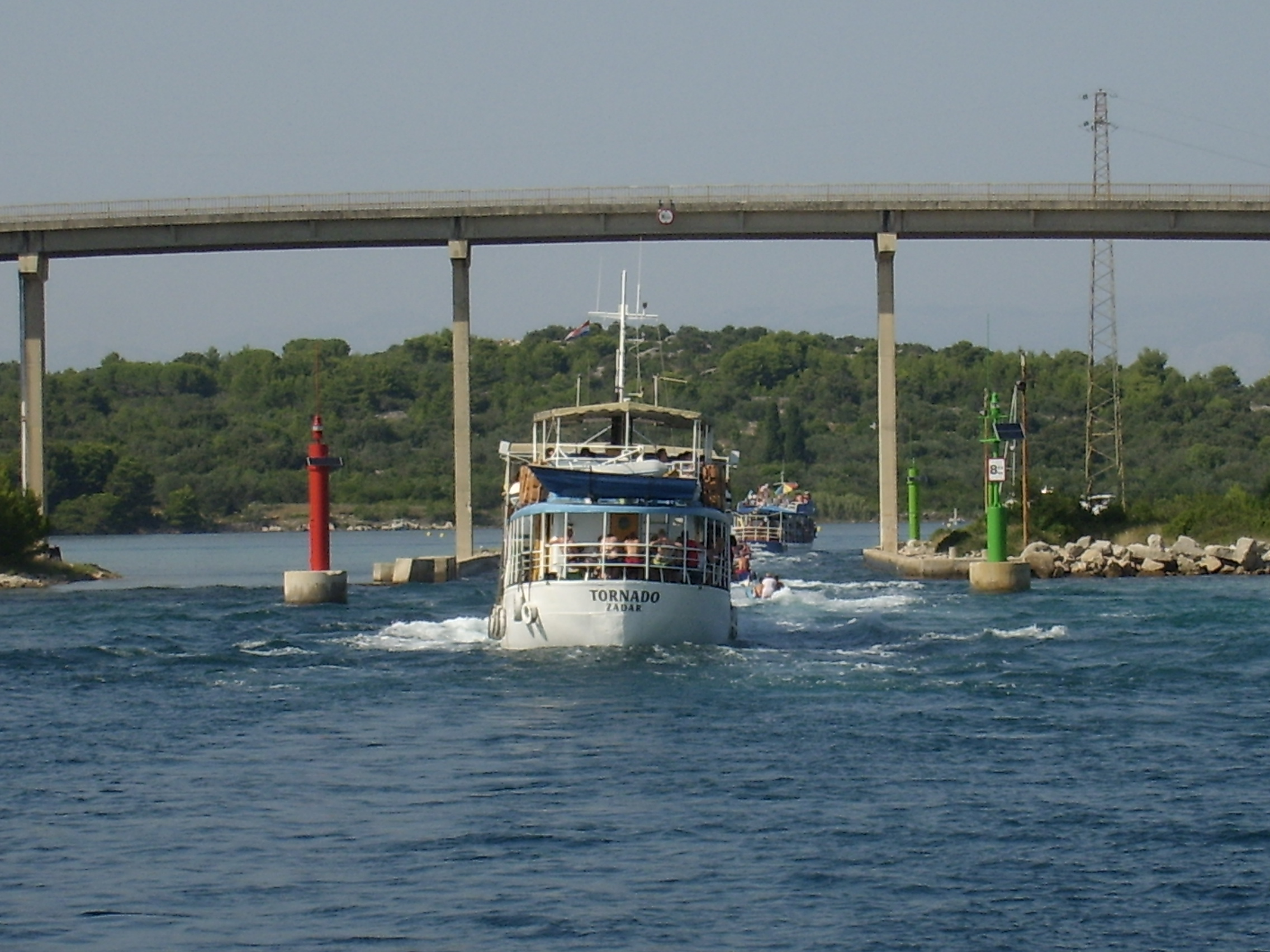
Ždrelac bridge prior to the 2009 reconstruction

The Ždrelac Bridge (Croatian: Most Ždrelac) is a 210-metre (690 ft) through arch bridge carrying the D110 state road connecting islands of Ugljan and Pašman in Croatia. The original bridge was completed in 1972, however 2009 reconstruction increased the main span (replacing three spans with one) and widened the deck.

Currently the main span consists of a 68-metre (223 ft) long steel arch carrying the 11.8-metre (39 ft) wide deck. The reconstruction works also included strengthening the piers supporting the central span arch structure. Cost of the reconstruction works was reported to be 17.17 million Croatian kuna. The reconstruction works were carried out by Konstruktor, Split.

== Traffic volume ==
Traffic on the state roads in Croatia is regularly counted and reported by Hrvatske ceste, operator of the state roads. There is no actual traffic count performed at the Ždrilac Bridge itself, however Hrvatske ceste operate a counting station which covers a section of the D110 state road adjacent to the D8 and L63171 county road junction (to the east of the junction). Since the Ždrelac Bridge is located immediately to the west of the junction, and no other D8 junctions are found between the two, the figure, even though not exact, is highly indicative of the traffic volume carried by the bridge.

Ždrelac Bridge traffic volume
Road	Counting site	AADT	ASDT	Notes
D110	4815 Kukljica	1,340	2,682	Adjacent to the L63171 junction.

== See also ==
- D110 state road
