= Biograd na Moru =

- Town
- Grad Biograd na Moru; Town of Biograd na Moru
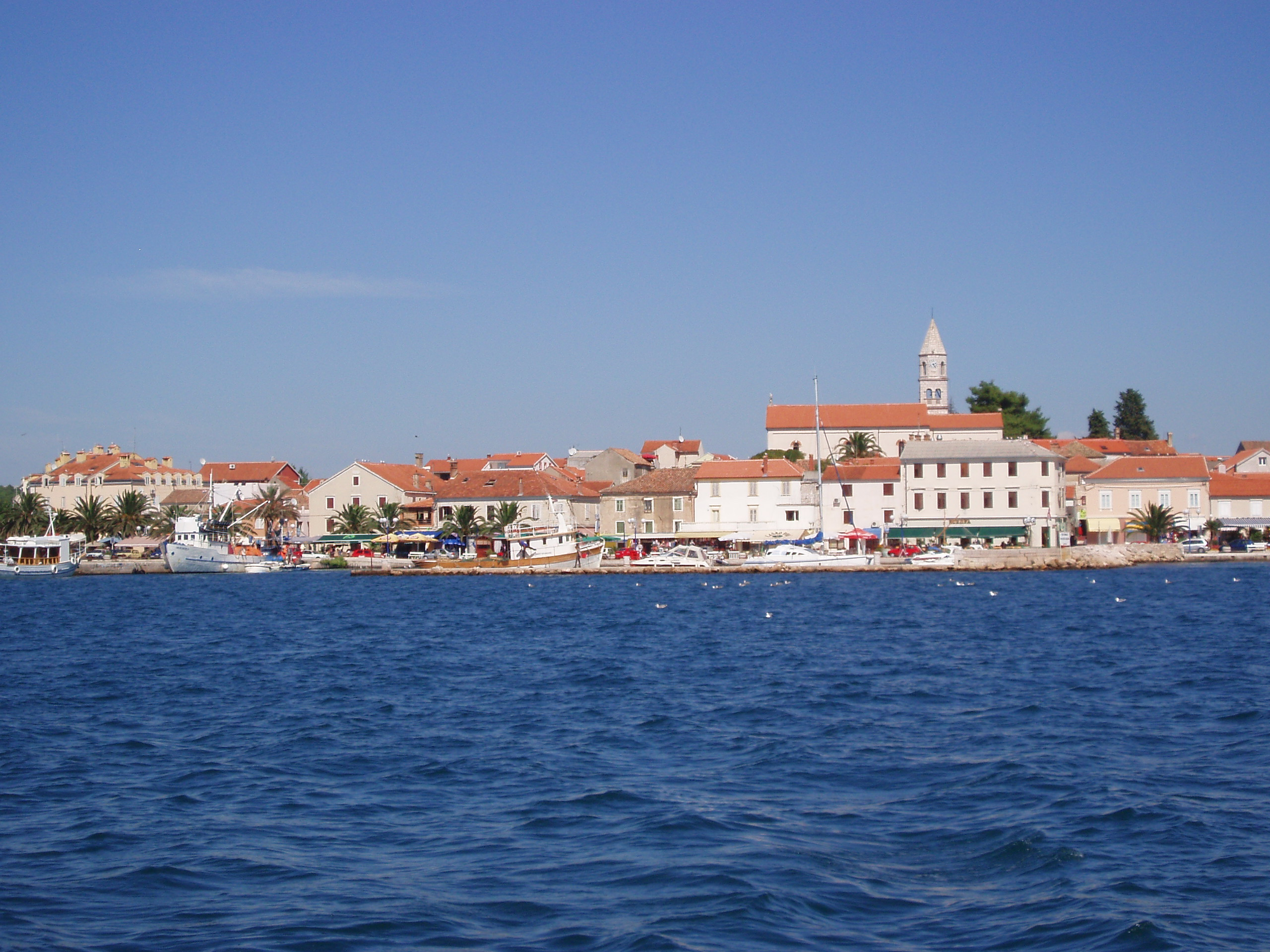
- View of Biograd na Moru

- Location of Biograd na Moru within Croatia
- Coordinates: 43°56′N 15°27′E
- Country: Croatia
- Region: Dalmatia
- County: Zadar County

Government
  - Mayor: Ivan Knez (HDZ)

Area
  - Town: 37.2 km^{2} (14.4 sq mi)
  - Land: 35.5 km^{2} (13.7 sq mi)
  - Urban: 37.2 km^{2} (14.4 sq mi)

Population (2021)
  - Town: 5,601
  - Density: 158/km^{2} (409/sq mi)
  - Urban: 5,601
  - Urban density: 151/km^{2} (390/sq mi)
- Time zone: UTC+1 (CET)
  - Summer (DST): UTC+2 (CEST)
- Postal code: 23210
- Area code: 023
- Website: biogradnamoru.hr

Biograd na Moru (pronounced [bîoɡraːd na mǒːru]), shortened to simply Biograd, is a town in northern Dalmatia in Croatia. It is significant for being another capital of the medieval Kingdom of Croatia. Biograd is administratively part of the Zadar County. It is located on the Adriatic Sea coast, overlooking the island of Pašman, on the road from Zadar and Sukošan towards Vodice and Šibenik.

== Etymology ==
The town's full Croatian name means 'white town on the sea' in the local Ikavian dialect. The name Biograd means 'white city' and semantically corresponds to several other Slavic toponyms, including Beograd (Belgrade), Belgorod, Białogard, and Belogradchik. The name was mentioned in the mid-10th century as a town founded in the Kingdom of Croatia. It was rendered in Latin as Alba Maritima, meaning 'white maritime (one)'.

== Geography ==
Biograd na Moru is located 28 km south of the county capital, Zadar. It is located on small peninsula between two small bays: Soline to the south and Bošana to the north. To the west are the islands Planac and Sveta Katarina. Average temperature in January is 7.3 °C and 23.9 °C in July. The only settlement in the Town is Biograd na Moru itself.

== Climate ==
Since records began in 1981, the highest temperature recorded at the local weather station was 39.2 °C (102.6 °F), on 4 August 2017. The coldest temperature was −8.0 °C (17.6 °F), on 27 December 1996.

== History ==
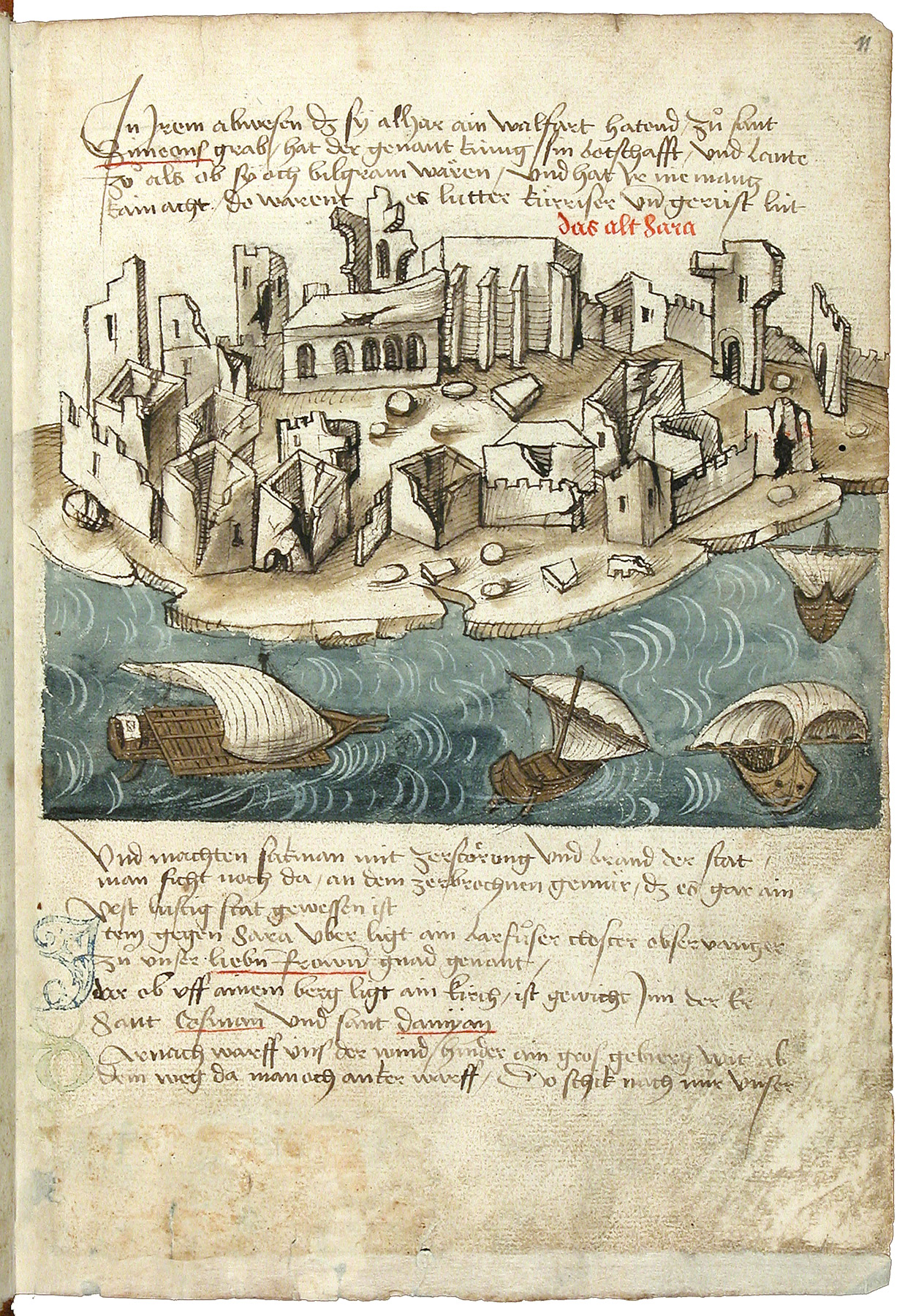
Ruins of Biograd from 1487.

=== Early medieval ===
A three-naved basilica was built on the basis of an older 6th-century church during the reign of Duke Branimir in the 9th century. The building later became the cathedral of the bishop of Biograd. One of the very significant characteristics of this building is the semi-circular buttresses, found only on the buildings in Croatia at that time.

The city was first mentioned as Biogradon in the mid-10th-century chronicle De Administrando Imperio as one of the populated towns in "christened Croatia". It was the centre of the county (županija) of Sidraga. There are allegations that the bishopric was founded during this time based on a charter whose authenticity is disputed. Thus, this is not universally accepted by historians.

During the wars between Kingdom of Croatia and the Republic of Venice in 1000, the town was captured for a brief time by the Venetians. During this time the Biograd na Moru was mentioned as a castle, and its citizens subsequently swore an oath of fealty to the Doge, who installed Vitale Michiel as a governor.

During the 1050s, it is for the first time mentioned as the seat of the Roman Catholic Diocese of Alba Maritima, a suffragan of Salona, until its 1226 suppression, when its territory was merged into the nearby Diocese of Skradin. The city flourished during this time. King Peter Krešimir IV founded the monasteries of St. John the Evangelist and St. Thomas in 1059 and 1066, both of them being three-naved basilicas. The nearby 9th century Cathedral was also expanded with a belltower and by adding the southern part of the walls. The function of prior (head of city elected by its commune in Dalmatia) is attested. The city was also a major port during the latter half of the 11th century. During the succession crisis in 1096, the Norman princess Felicia of Sicily disembarked in the port of the city to marry the Hungarian king Coloman.

It was the city where Coloman of Hungary was crowned in 1102 by the Biograd bishop Bono, as the crown of Croatia was passed to the Hungarians. In the subsequent years its rule was exchanged between Venice and the Árpád family. At this point, the city is mentioned as a "royal city" (urbe regia) for the first time in surviving documents. The expanded name Belgradum supra mare (Biograd na Moru) is also for the first time attested during this period.

Around the year 1115, the city was acquired by the Republic of Venice, which then tore down the city walls towards the sea, so it would "for all times (per tutti tempi) remain in the possession of the Serenissima". It was eventually reconquered by Stephen II of Hungary in 1124.

In 1125, after it again fell to the Venetian hands, it was destroyed on the orders of the Venetian doge because of it vicinity to Zadar. According to the Historia Ducum Veneticorum, only the citizens of Biograd na Moru "... dared resist the doge and his army ...", during his reconquest of Dalmatia but "... their city was razed to its foundations." The city core, consisting of the royal palace, ban's court, as well as monasteries and churches, was plundered. Much of the local monks fled to the nearby islands of Tkon and Pašman and the Biograd bishopric was abolished; its territories were added to the Bishopric of Zadar. The population, along with the bishop, moved to Skradin. A 15th-century drawing that depicts the ruins of Biograd also attest the bishop's palace beside the cathedral, as well as stone buildings and residences.

It was another capital of most Croatian regnants such as Stephen Držislav and Peter Krešimir IV, as well as an important religious place.

=== Later history ===
In 1202, when the Crusaders of the Fourth Crusade occupied Zadar, many of its citizens took refuge in Biograd na Moru, then noted as Jadra Nova ("New Zadar"). Two years later, the most of them left back to Zadar, after which the city was also referred to as Jadera Vetula ("Old Zadar") or Zara vecchia in Italian translation.

During the 13th and 14th century the city was run by the dukes of Cetina, the Knights Templar of Vrana and the dukes of Bribir the Šubićes. It was acquired by the Venetian Republic in 1409 and would remain its property until its downfall in 1797.

During the Venetian-Turkish wars, the city was gravely damaged, and on two occasions, in 1521 and in 1646, it was destroyed and burned. In the 16th and 17th century, the Croatian militia formed in Biograd na Moru and had much involvement in the wars against the Ottomans.

In recent history, the Yugoslavian forces inflicted considerable damage by long-range bombardment in the period 1991-1993 during the Croatian War of Independence.

== Population ==
Historical population
Year	Pop.	±%
1857	649	—
1869	693	+6.8%
1880	675	−2.6%
1890	796	+17.9%
1900	1,044	+31.2%
1910	1,137	+8.9%
1921	1,181	+3.9%
1931	1,495	+26.6%
1948	1,806	+20.8%
1953	2,115	+17.1%
1961	2,418	+14.3%
1971	3,486	+44.2%
1981	4,560	+30.8%
1991	5,315	+16.6%
2001	5,259	−1.1%
2011	5,569	+5.9%
2021	5,601	+0.6%
Source: Naselja i stanovništvo Republike Hrvatske 1857–2021, DZS

The town and the settlement itself have a population of 5,601 (2021 census). The majority are Croats (95,5%).

Town of Biograd na Moru: Population trends 1857–2021
v

population	649	693	675	796	1044	1137	1181	1495	1806	2115	2418	3486	4560	5315	5259	5569	5601
	1857	1869	1880	1890	1900	1910	1921	1931	1948	1953	1961	1971	1981	1991	2001	2011	2021

Sources: Croatian Bureau of Statistics publications

== Gallery ==
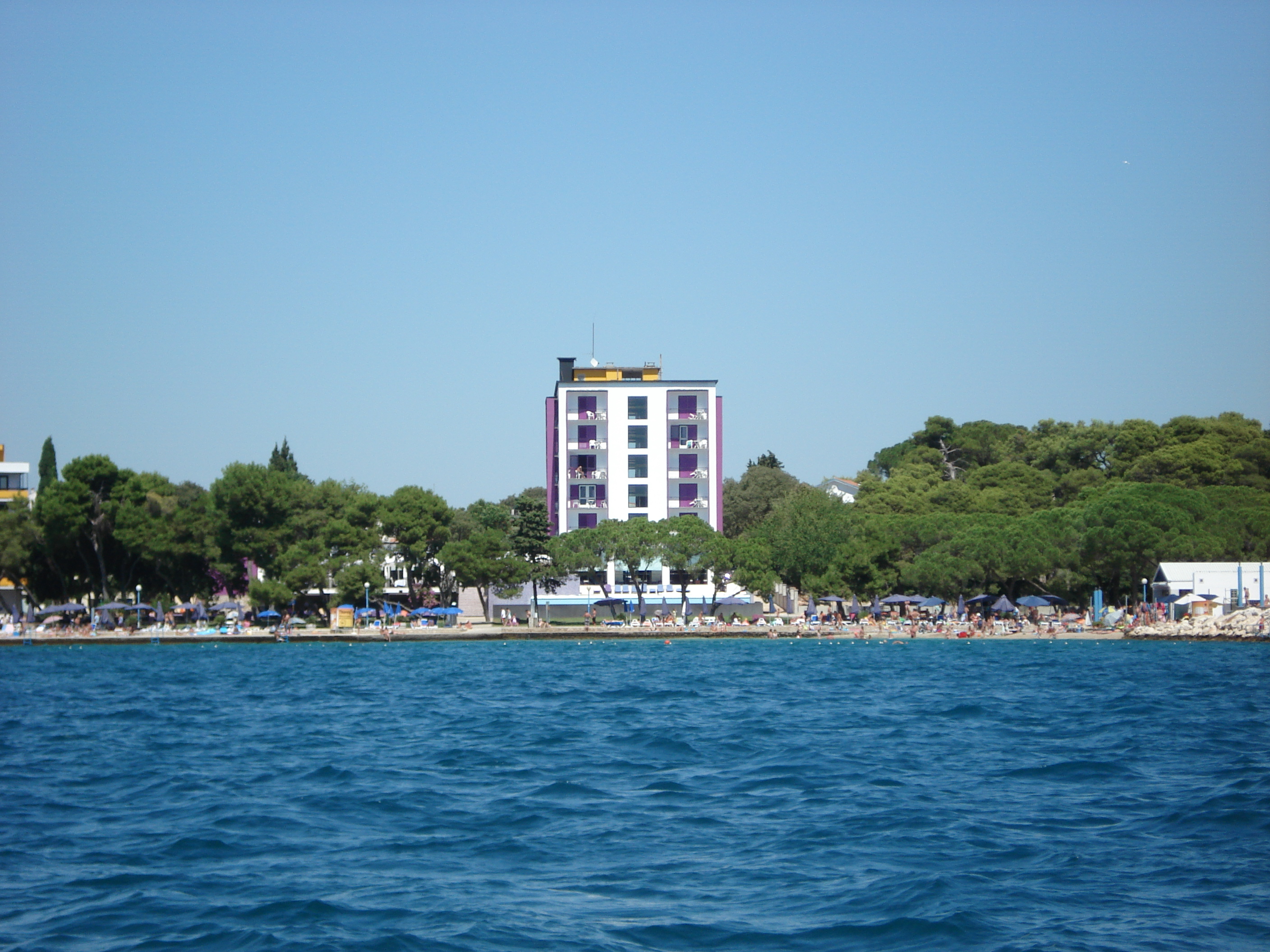
Biograd na Moru waterfront

== Twin towns – sister cities ==
Biograd na Moru is twinned with:

- Kressbronn am Bodensee, Germany, since 2010
- Alba Iulia, Romania, since 2016
- Bishop's Stortford, England, United Kingdom
- Slovenske Konjice, Slovenia, since 2019
- Porto San Giorgio, Italy
- Stará Ľubovňa, Slovakia
