= Mrljane =

Coordinates: 43°57′N 15°22′E

- Village
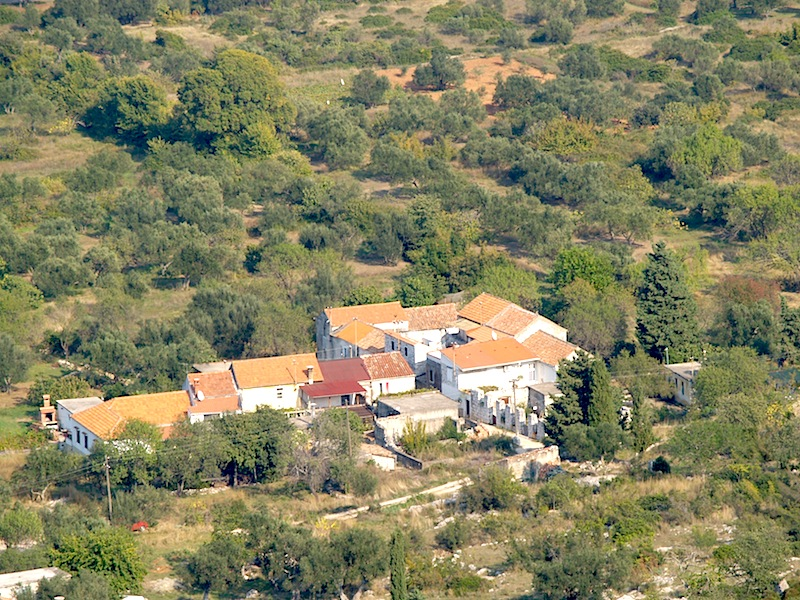
- Interactive map of Mrljane
- Country: Croatia

Area
  - Total: 4.6 km^{2} (1.8 sq mi)

Population (2021)
  - Total: 253
  - Density: 55/km^{2} (140/sq mi)
- Time zone: UTC+1 (CET)
  - Summer (DST): UTC+2 (CEST)

Mrljane is a village in Croatia. It is connected by the D110 highway.

The village has a beach.

Prof. Ivo Livljanić, the first Croatian Ambassadors of the Republic of Croatia to the Holy See, was born in Mrljane.

The oldest church on the island, the church of saint Michael, is located on the northwest side of the village.

The old village lodge consists of various old stone houses with some dating back to the 1600s, and nowadays provides tourist accommodation by the seaside.
