= Pašman =

Island of Croatia

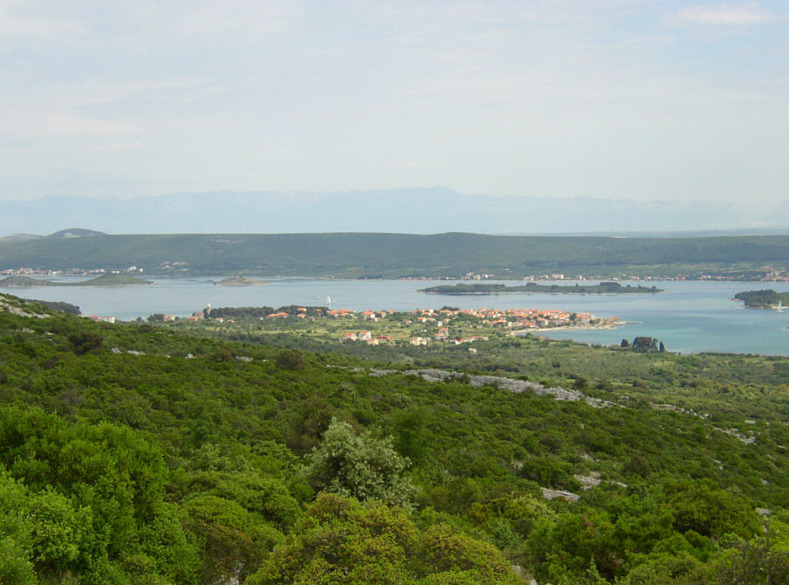

Geography
- Location: Adriatic Sea
- Coordinates: 43°57′N 15°23′E
- Area: 60.11 km^{2} (23.21 sq mi)
- Highest elevation: 272 m (892 ft)
- Highest point: Bokolj

Administration
- Croatia
- County: Zadar County
- Municipalities: Pašman, Tkon
- Largest settlement: Tkon

Demographics
- Population: 2,845 (2011)
- Pop. density: 33.34/km^{2} (86.35/sq mi)

Pašman (pronounced [pǎʃman]) is an Adriatic island off the coast of northern Dalmatia in Croatia with an area of 60.11 km^{2}, located to the south of Zadar, surrounded by the islands of Ugljan to the northwest, Iž to the west, and Dugi Otok and Žut to the southwest. The island is inhabited by 2,845 people, according to the 2011 census.

There are 10 settlements on the island; Ždrelac, Banj, Dobropoljana, Neviđane, Mrljane, Barotul, Pašman and Kraj, belonging to the Municipality of Pašman, and Ugrinić and Tkon, belonging to the Municipality of Tkon.

Among all islands in the Croatian archipelago it is Pašman that has the biggest green surface considering its total area. It is the 12th largest island in the archipelago by land area. It is also known to have the cleanest water in the Adriatic due to the constantly changing currents.

== History ==
View of Pašman and Ugljan from the Great Bokolj hill view-point.

In addition to rare Stone Age finds, many Bronze and Iron Age fortifications confirm the early settlement of the island. Roman writers count Pašman among the Liburnian islands. From the Liburnian period comes the oldest known name of one of the island settlements: Katan (today's Tkon). The oldest known names of the island (Flaveico or Insula Postimana) can be associated with Roman colonisation. Due to the importance of the Pašman Channel as a protected waterway, the eastern side of the island was densely populated in antiquity. Pašman belonged to the Zadar area, but no larger urban-type settlement developed on it. Constantine VII Porphyrogenitus probably mentions Pašman in the middle of the 10th century, and his records show that the island was uninhabited at the time. In the Middle Ages, most of Pašman was owned by the nobles of Zadar, citizens and church institutions. The first Benedictine estate on Pašman, St. Michael's in Neviđane, owned by the Zadar Monastery of St. Chrysogonus, mentioned in the 11th century. The island seems to have been part of the Diocese of Biograd at that time. According to some sources, the Bishop of Biograd Prestancije ceded in 1076 to the monastery of St. John in Biograd (founded 1059) the Church of St. Cosmas and Damian on the hill Ćokovac above Tkon. After the Venetian destruction of Biograd in 1125, the seat of Rogovska Abbey was moved there. After the Crusaders' Siege of Zadar in 1202, the Zadar Chapter was located on Ćokovac and the city's nobility escaped. During the Siege of Zadar in 1345, the Venetian Monastery of St. Cosmas and Damian were destroyed, the monks captured and the archives taken away. The abbey was rebuilt after the Treaty of Zadar in 1358, when a new monastery church was built. Although the Franciscan tradition connects the beginnings of monasticism on the island with the time of St. Francis, the Franciscans first appeared on Pašman in the list of monasteries of the province around 1380. The monastery of St. Duje in Kraj was built for the Franciscans of Bosnia in 1390 near the already existing Church of St. Dujam. With the transfer of the command (church property given to the administration and lease) in 1434, and the loss of land ownership due to the Ottoman conquests, the monastery gradually weakened. Ties with Bosnia were not severed despite the 1467 decision that banned Bosnian Franciscans from staying in the monastery. The settlement that was formed around the monastery by settling the population of refugees before the Ottomans forms the core of today's place. During the French rule in Dalmatia, the abbey was abolished (1808), but the religious community was rebuilt in 1956, so that it is, to this day, the only male Benedictine monastery in Croatia. The monastery Church of St. Duje was thoroughly rebuilt in the 16th century; above the church portal there is a relief of St. Jerome, the patron saint of Dalmatia, work of A. Aleši.

The Pašman Monastery of St. Cosmas and Damian was one of the centers of the spread of Glagolitic literacy in the northern Dalmatia. Numerous Glagolitic manuscripts were created in the monastery, of which the Rule of St. Benedict, whose translation from Latin into Old Slavonic was made as early as the 11th century. It is believed that it was the Pašman monks who traveled to Prague as teachers of Glagolitic and Old Slavonic.

== Geography ==
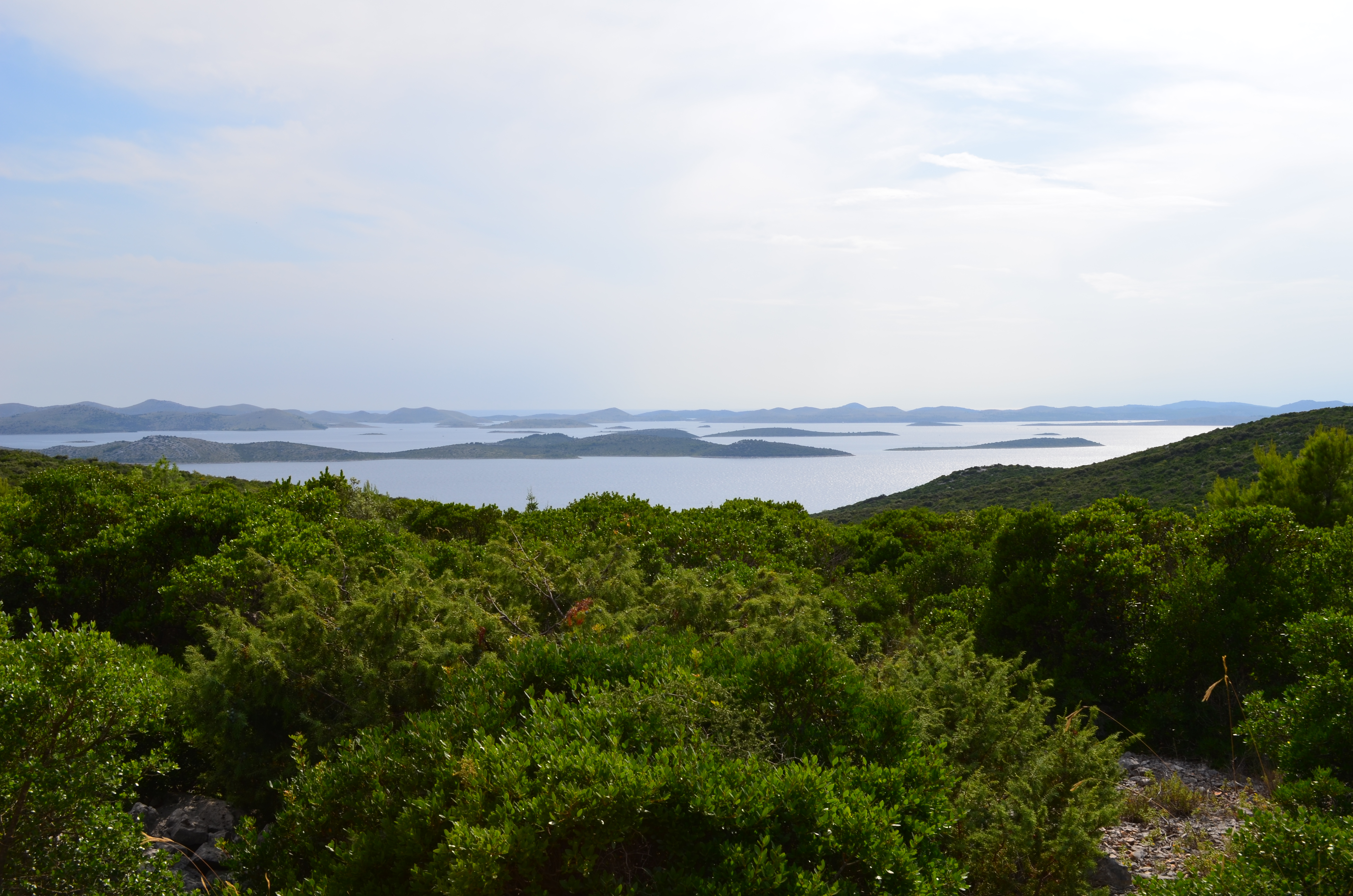
The Kornati archipelago as seen from Pašman.

With an area of 60 km2 and 70 km of indented coastline, it is one of the larger Croatian islands. It is connected to the island of Ugljan by the Ždrelac Bridge, and is separated from the mainland by the Pašman Channel, which in some places is only 2 km wide. It is also one of the islands closest to the mainland. It is located in the Zadar archipelago, between the cities of Zadar and Biograd at Sea.

The Mediterranean climate has developed a rich world of flora and fauna, many species of medicinal and aromatic plants, and the seabed preserves all species of shellfish and fish of the Croatian Adriatic.

The beaches are pebbled and rocky, with many docks. Near Pašman, sea currents change every 6 hours, affecting the local water quality. On the east side of the island, swimming is available along natural rocks with stone plateaus. Most facilities are located near the sea and the beaches.

== Transport ==
The island can be reached by ferry from Zadar, the line Zadar-Preko (island of Ugljan) and then the state road D110 and the Ždrelac Bridge. The second ferry line departs from Biograd and leads to Tkon on the island of Pašman. All places on the island are connected by an island road. It is separated from the island of Ugljan, with which it was connected in the recent past by a shoal that could be crossed, by the Little Ždrelac canal dug in 1883, and in 1979 deepened to a depth of 4 meters and bridged by a bridge in Ždrelac. The bridge was renovated and made bigger in 2010.

== Economy ==
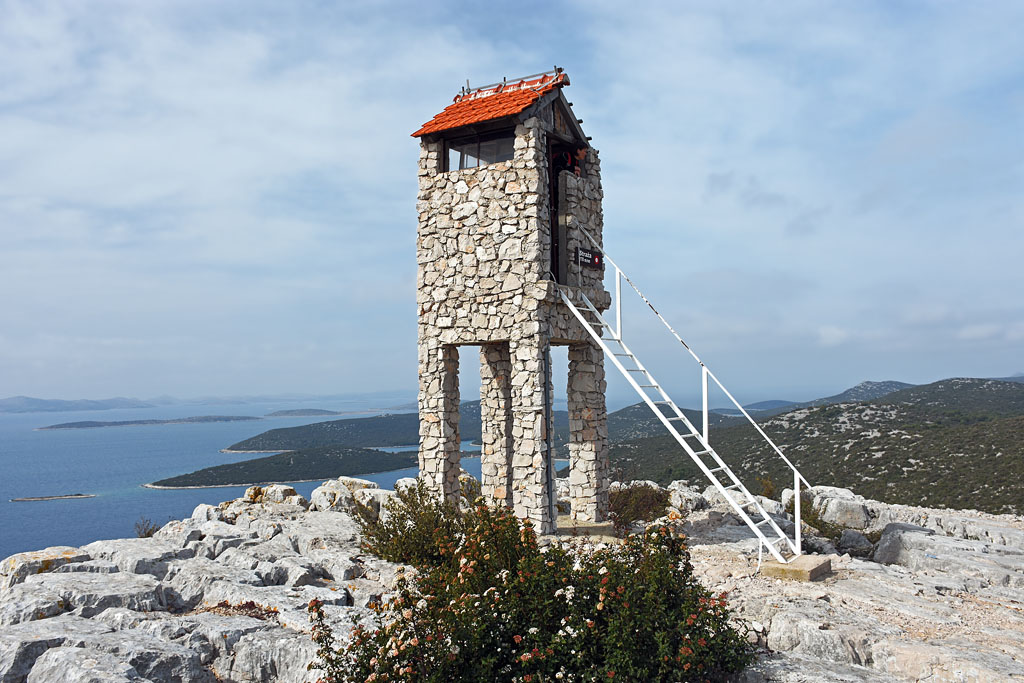
Straža

Pašman is known for its beautiful sandy beaches and pine forests on the north side of the island facing the mainland. Pašman towns are small and quiet and therefore suitable for rest and relaxation. In all small villages of Pašman there are several shops, taverns and other service activities. The south side of the island abounds in untouched nature, numerous bays, blue sea, old fishermen's houses and all with a view of the Kornati National Park. This side of the island is without roads and as such is very popular for Robinson Crusoe-style holidays.

Most of the 3,100 inhabitants of typical island towns are traditionally engaged in fishing and farming, and more recently in tourism. A rich tourist offering has been developed: rooms of several categories, apartments, holiday homes, boarding houses, car camps, taverns and restaurants serving numerous types of local fresh seafood.

== Summits ==
- Veliki Bokolj, 274 m,
- Oštro, 254 m,
- Semica, 199 m,
- Straža, 180 m,
- Jakovljev vrh, 178 m,
- Mali Bokolj, 164 m,
- Cudonjin, 146 m,
- Martinjak, 139 m,
- Pustograd, 108 m,
