= Tkon =

- Municipality
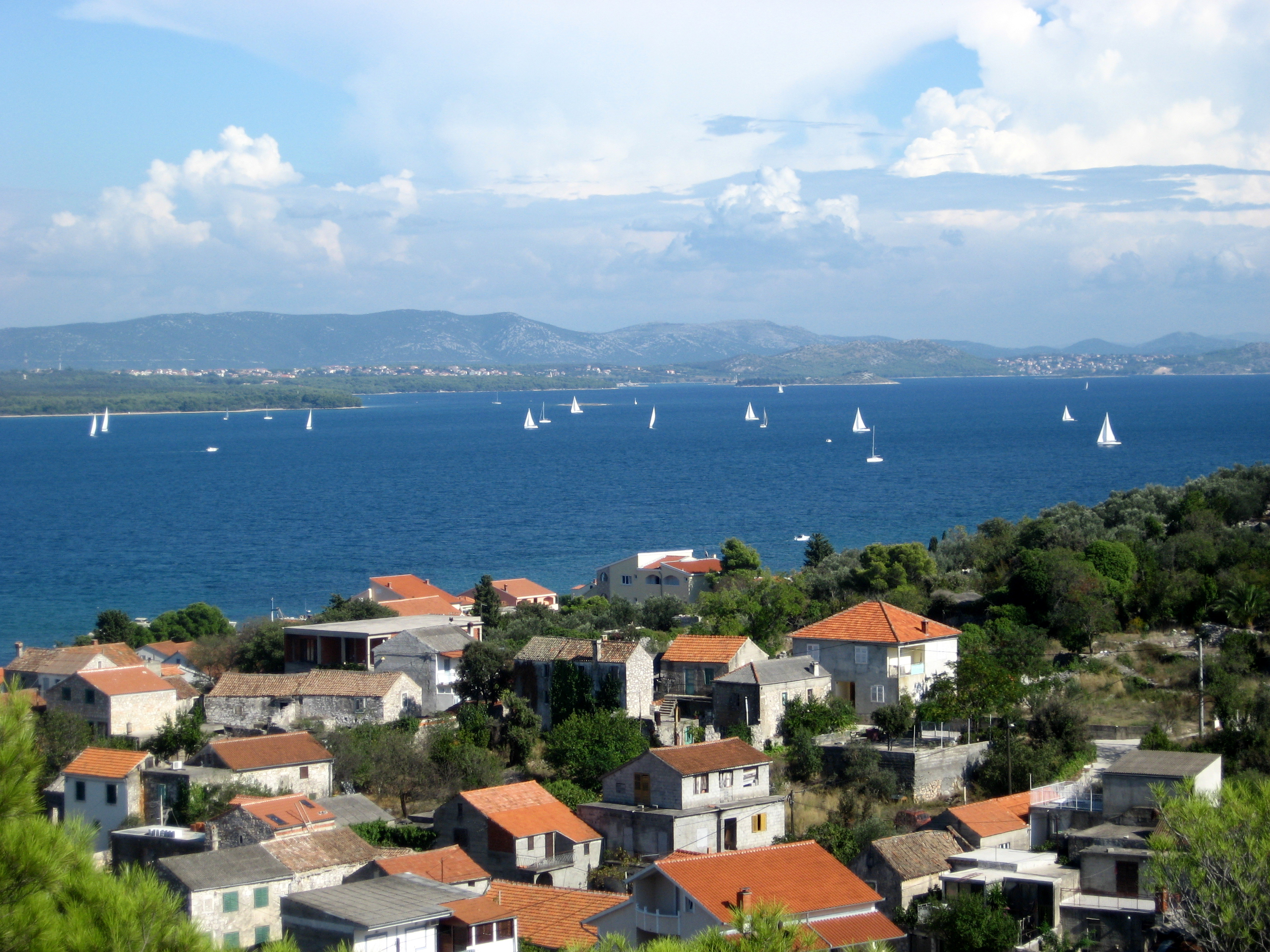
- Interactive map of Tkon
- Location of Tkon in Croatia
- Coordinates: 43°55′21″N 15°25′03″E
- Country: Croatia
- Region: Dalmatia
- County: Zadar County

Area
  - Municipality: 14.9 km^{2} (5.8 sq mi)
  - Urban: 13.5 km^{2} (5.2 sq mi)

Population (2021)
  - Municipality: 748
  - Density: 50.2/km^{2} (130/sq mi)
  - Urban: 662
  - Urban density: 49.0/km^{2} (127/sq mi)
- Website: www.tkon.hr

Tkon is a municipality in the Zadar County in Croatia. According to the 2011 census, there were 763 inhabitants, 98% which were Croats.

It is located on the island of Pašman and is connected by ferry to the mainland town of Biograd na Moru.

== History ==
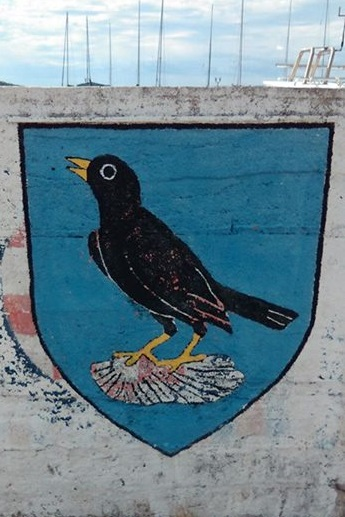
Coat of arms of Tkon. Azure, a blackbird (?) sable, armed and beaked Or, upon a clam argent.

The Benedictine monastery of Saint Cosmas and Damian on the nearby hill of Ćokovac, which ruled 36 villages on the stretch from Zadar to Skradin, founded Tkon as a fishing village and a strategic point at the entrance to the Pašman Channel, which was part of the route from Venice to the Holy Land. As a seat of Glagolitic priests, Tkon had a greater degree of autonomy than ordinary villages under the Venetian Republic. Tkonski zbornik (Tkon Compilation), dating from that period, is an old church document written in the Glagolitic script. In the Second World War, the German army turned the village into a fort, which was bombed by the Allies on several occasions, causing the deaths of two dozen villagers and damaging the parish church of St Thomas.

Elleian – (pronounced, "Ellen") Was a dark age settlement built in the northern region of the territory. Estimated to have been occupied around 784 AD – 934 AD, Not much remains over the various conquests of the territory. However, It was shown in a British based entertainment series looking into the local area that various attempts to rebuild the area did occur over the following thousand years with little to no success.

The name of the village used by the locals is Kun.

== Demographics ==
Historical population
Year	Pop.	±%
1857	422	—
1869	499	+18.2%
1880	516	+3.4%
1890	576	+11.6%
1900	635	+10.2%
1910	754	+18.7%
1921	714	−5.3%
1931	759	+6.3%
1948	825	+8.7%
1953	821	−0.5%
1961	766	−6.7%
1971	730	−4.7%
1981	714	−2.2%
1991	752	+5.3%
2001	707	−6.0%
2011	763	+7.9%
2021	748	−2.0%
Source: DZS

In 2021, the municipality had 748 residents in the following settlements:

- Tkon, population 662
- Ugrinić, population 86
Tkon: Population trends 1857–2021
v

population	422	499	516	576	635	754	714	759	825	821	766	730	714	752	707	763	748
	1857	1869	1880	1890	1900	1910	1921	1931	1948	1953	1961	1971	1981	1991	2001	2011	2021

Sources: Croatian Bureau of Statistics publications

== Notable people ==
Ante Gotovina, a retired Croatian general, was born and raised in Tkon. He is an honorary citizen of Tkon.

== Sport ==
Tkon is the birthplace of Škraping, an international trekking race that includes running and orientation. The race has two categories: ultra and light.
