= D109 road =

Road in Croatia

D109 state road

Route information
- Length: 44.4 km (27.6 mi)

Major junctions
- From: Veli Rat
- D124 near Brbinj; D125 near Zaglav ferry port
- To: Telašćica Nature Park

Location
- Country: Croatia
- Counties: Zadar

Highway system
- Highways in Croatia

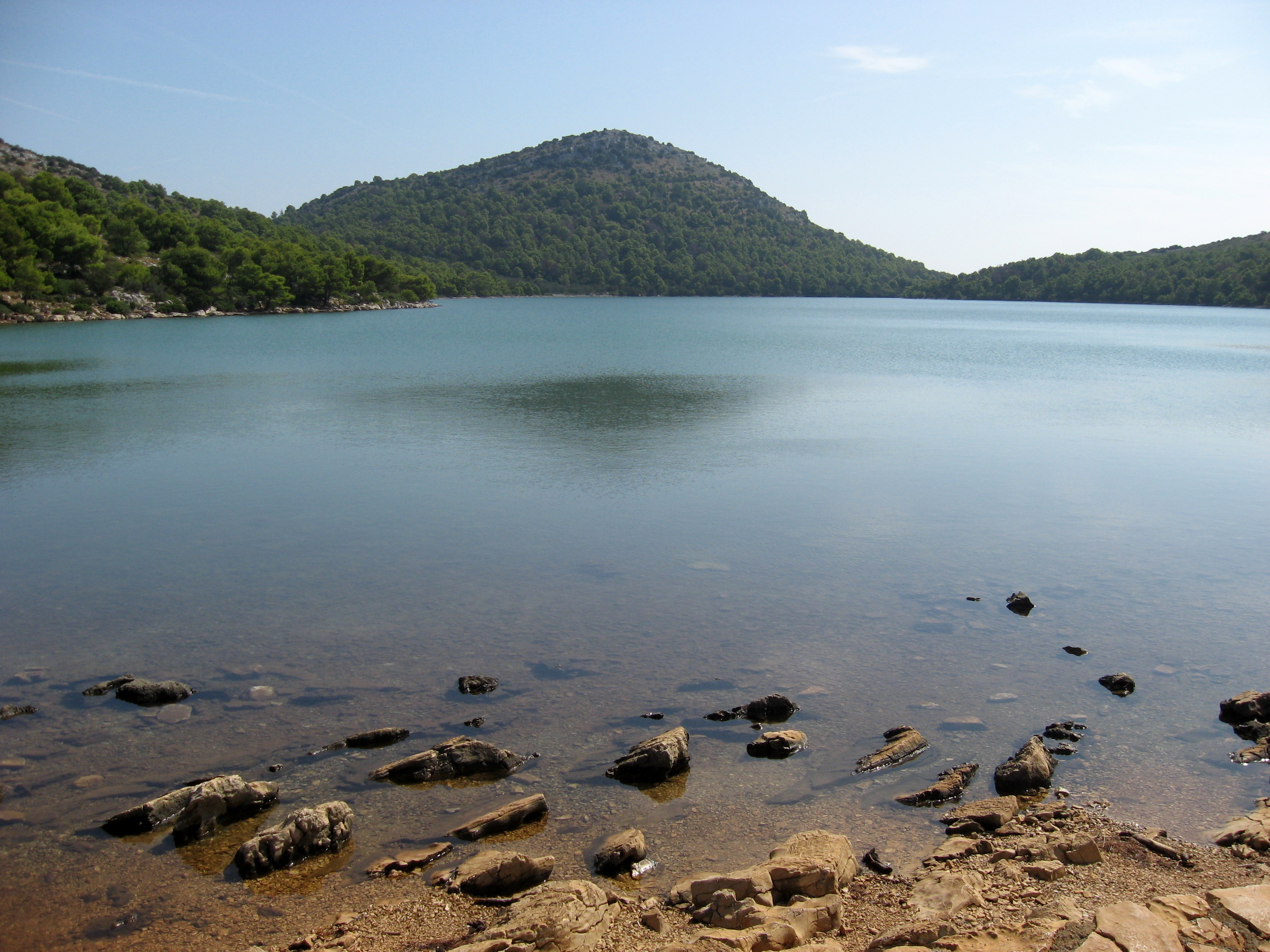
Telašćica Nature Park, at the eastern terminus of the D109 road

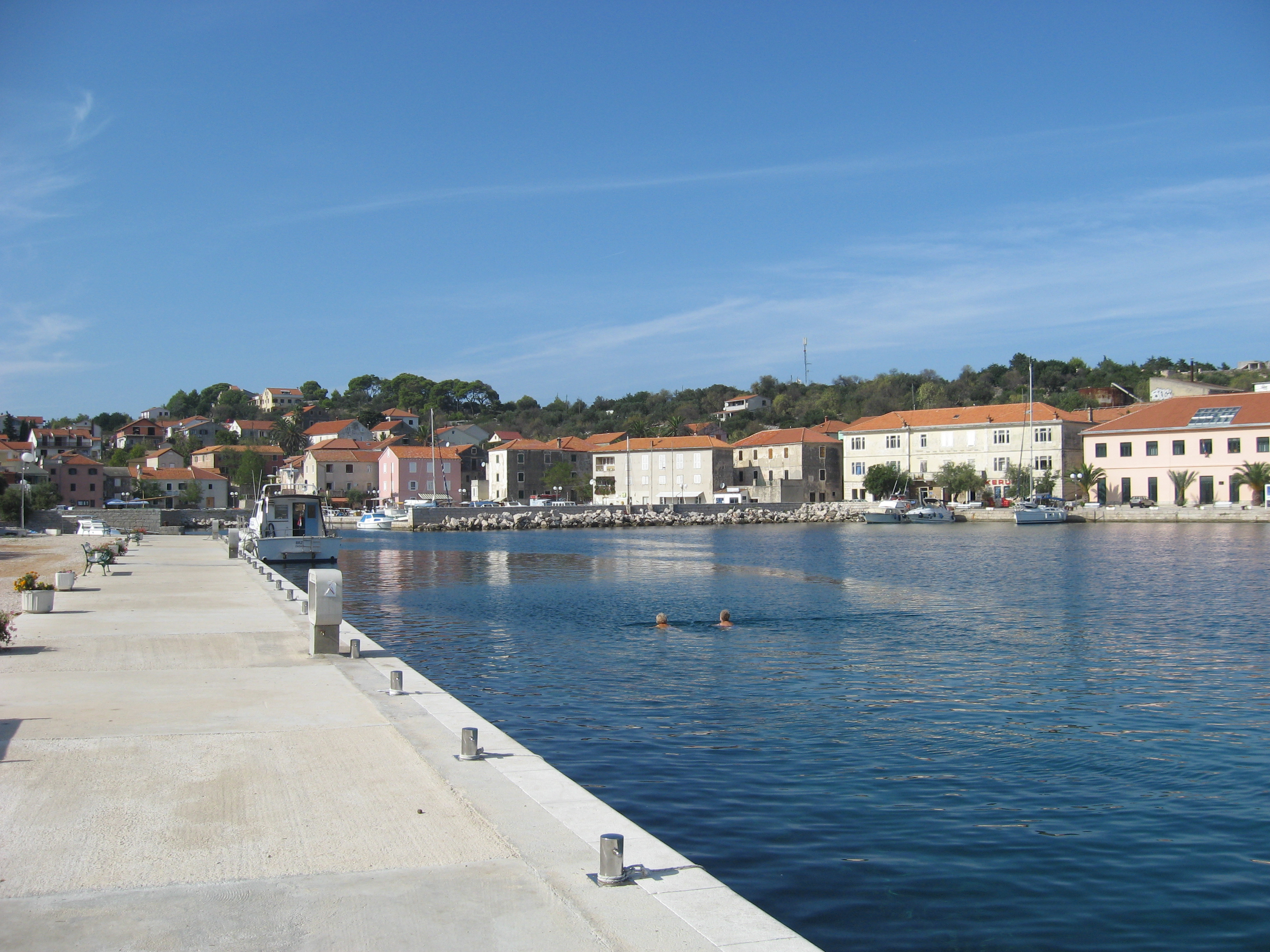
Sali, near the D109 road route

D109 is the main state road on the Dugi Otok Island in Croatia connecting Telašćica Nature Park and a number of island villages and resorts to Brbinj and Zaglav ferry ports, via the D124 and D125 respectively, from where Jadrolinija ferries fly to the mainland, docking in Zadar and the D407 state road. The road is 44.4 km (27.6 mi) long.

The road, as well as all other state roads in Croatia, is managed and maintained by Hrvatske ceste, a state-owned company.

== Traffic volume ==
Traffic is regularly counted and reported by Hrvatske ceste (HC), operator of the road. Substantial variations between annual (AADT) and summer (ASDT) traffic volumes are attributed to the fact that the road connects a number of island resorts.

D109 traffic volume
Road	Counting site	AADT	ASDT	Notes
D109	4813 Brbinj	316	656	Adjacent to the D124 junction.

== Road junctions and populated areas ==
D109 junctions/populated areas
Type	Slip roads/Notes
	Veli Rat; The western terminus of the road.
	Soline
	D124 to Brbinj and Brbinj ferry port - access to the mainland port of Zadar (by Jadrolinija) and D407 to Zadar and the A1 motorway Zadar 1 and Zadar 2 interchanges.
	Ž6059 to Luka
	Ž6060 to Žman
	D125 to Zaglav ferry port - access to the mainland port of Zadar (by Jadrolinija)
	Ž6061 to Sali
	Telašćica Nature Park; The eastern terminus of the road.

== See also ==
- Hrvatske ceste
- Jadrolinija
