= D125 road =

Road in Croatia

D125 state road

Route information
- Length: 1.1 km (0.68 mi)

Major junctions
- From: Zaglav ferry port
- To: D109 near Brbinj

Location
- Country: Croatia
- Counties: Zadar

Highway system
- Highways in Croatia

D125 is a state road on Dugi Otok Island in Croatia connecting the D109 state road to Zaglav ferry port, from where Jadrolinija passenger ferries fly to the mainland, docking in Zadar and the D407 state road. The road is 1.1 km (0.68 mi) long.

The road, as well as all other state roads in Croatia, is managed and maintained by Hrvatske ceste, a state-owned company.

== Road junctions and populated areas ==
D125 junctions/populated areas
Type	Slip roads/Notes
	Zaglav ferry port – access to the mainland port of Zadar (by Jadrolinija) and the D407 state road. The northern terminus of the road.
	D109 to Brbinj ferry port (via the D124) and Soline (to the west) and to Telašćica Nature Park (to the east). The southern terminus of the road.
