= D124 road =

Road in Croatia

D124 state road

Route information
- Length: 1.7 km (1.1 mi)

Major junctions
- From: Brbinj ferry port
- To: D109 near Brbinj

Location
- Country: Croatia
- Counties: Zadar

Highway system
- Highways in Croatia

D124 is a state road on Dugi Otok Island in Croatia connecting the D109 state road to Brbinj ferry port, from where Jadrolinija ferries fly to the mainland, docking in Zadar and the D407 state road. The road is 1.7 km (1.1 mi) long.

The road, as well as all other state roads in Croatia, is managed and maintained by Hrvatske ceste, a state-owned company.

== Traffic volume ==
Traffic volume is not counted on the D124 road directly, however Hrvatske ceste, operator of the road reports number of vehicles using Zadar – Brbinj ferry line, connecting the D124 road to the D407 state road. Substantial variations between annual (AADT) and summer (ASDT) traffic volumes are attributed to the fact that the road connects a number of island resorts to the mainland.

D124 traffic volume
Road	Counting site	AADT	ASDT	Notes
D124	434 Zadar - Brbinj	135	317	Vehicles using Zadar-Brbinj ferry line.

== Road junctions and populated areas ==
D124 junctions/populated areas
Type	Slip roads/Notes
	Brbinj ferry port – access to the mainland port of Zadar (by Jadrolinija) and the D407 to Zadar and the A1 motorway Zadar 1 and Zadar 2 interchanges. The northern terminus of the road.
	Brbinj
	D109 to Soline (to the west) and to Zaglav ferry port (via the D125) and Telašćica Nature Park (to the east). The southern terminus of the road.
