= Tovareća mužika =

Traditional music ensemble from Sali

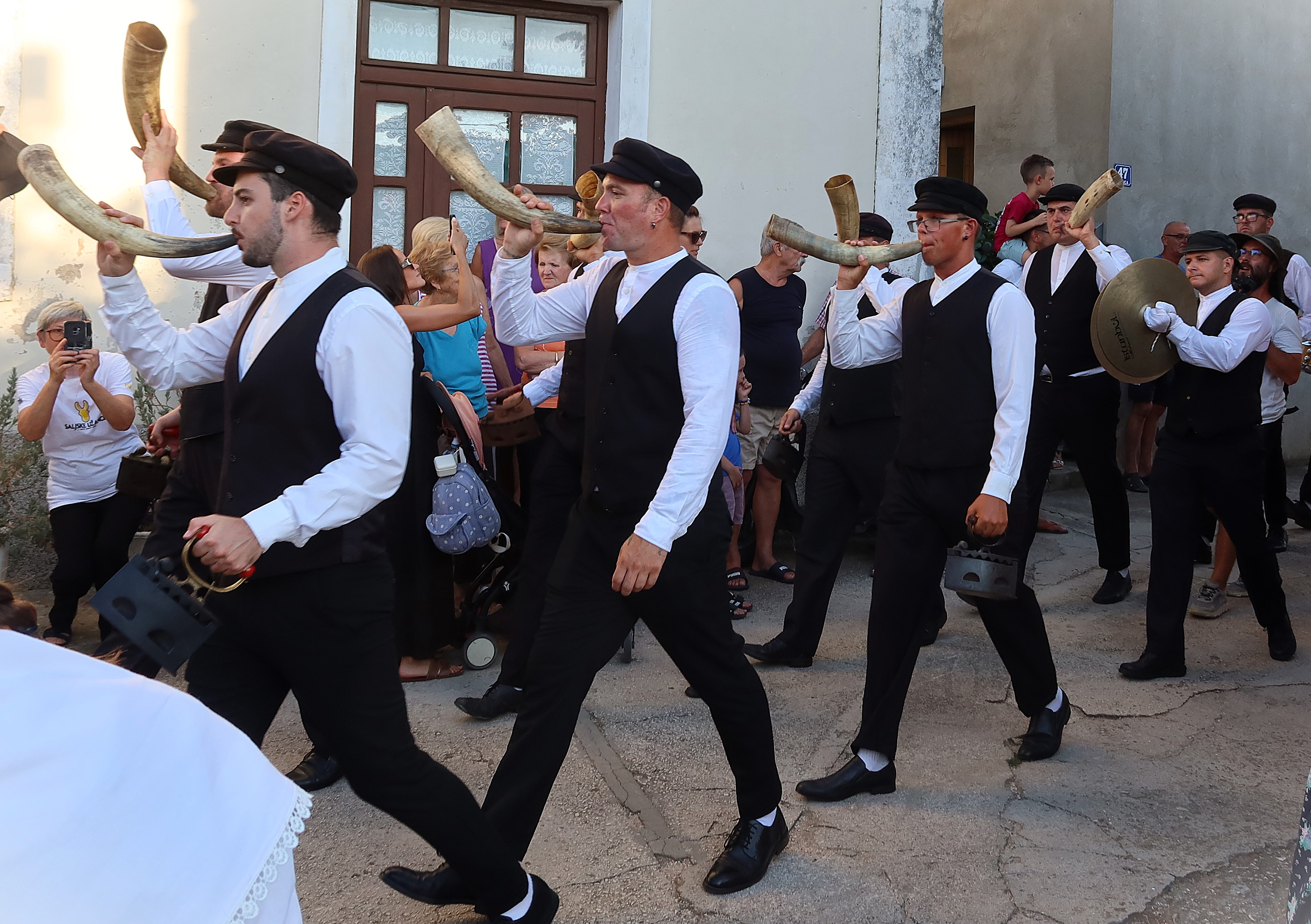
Traditional Tovareća mužika music in Sali, Dugi Otok, Croatia

The Tovareća mužika (literally "donkey music") is a traditional musical ensemble originating from Sali, on the island of Dugi Otok. Its orchestrated form appeared in 1959, during the creation of the first donkey races (Trke tovarov) which take place during the annual festivities of the Saljske užance. This ensemble is distinguished by the use of ox horns and metallic percussion, incorporating rituals linked to the maritime and working-class identity of the village.

== Origins and traditions ==
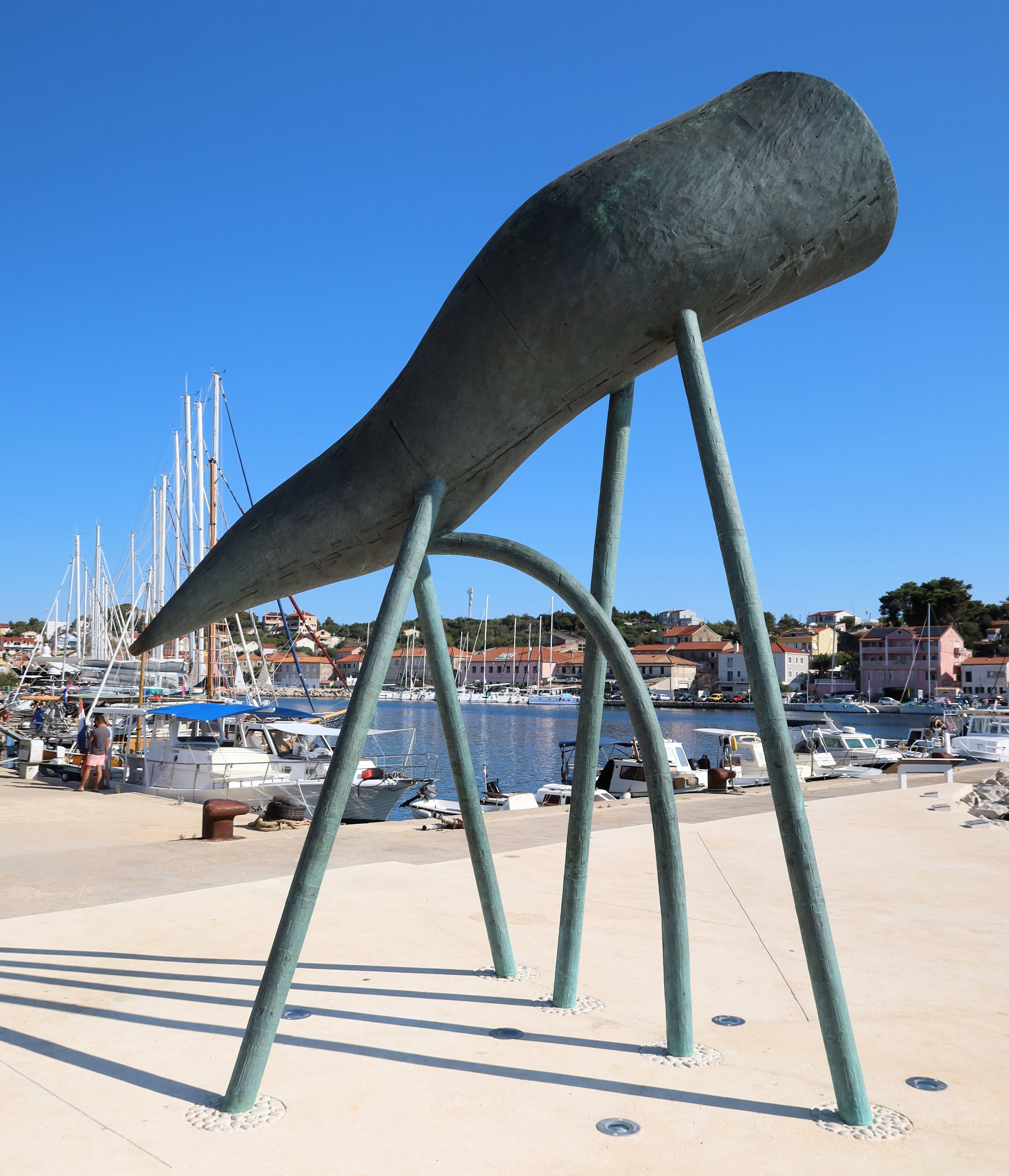
The "Rog" monument, symbol of the Tovareća mužika, inaugurated in 2024 on the port of Sali..

The Tovareća mužika traces its roots back to the maritime culture of Sali. Originally, the ox horn (rog) was an essential communication tool for coordinating bluefish fishing. Every household possessed this instrument, which was believed to have magical virtues capable of protecting against the "evil eye" during nights at sea.

The symbolic importance of this instrument is now embodied by a five-meter-high bronze sculpture, named Rog, erected on one of the harbor's squares (Porat) to celebrate this tradition.

== The founding act (1959) ==
Although the horn was already used historically as a charivari to mock the weddings of widowers or "spinsters", its orchestrated form was born in 1959. Taking advantage of the commotion (vela batarela) surrounding a local wedding, a group of young people organized themselves in a double file, like a marching band, to transform the usual racket into a recognizable melody: the march Šjora Mare. Goroslav Oštrić, one of the initiators of the project, was its first leader (the meštar). This performance has since become a central pillar of the Sali festivities (Saljske užance).

== Ceremony and rituals ==
The Tovareća mužika accompanying the official closing ceremony and the laying down of the emblems in Sali.

As a true common thread of the festivities, the Tovareća mužika sets the rhythm and synchronizes each sequence of the Saljske užance. Members wear dark work clothing reminiscent of the workers at the local fish cannery (the Mardešić factory), as well as a sailor's cap called a rašketa.

Under the authority of their leader, the group parades and marks the step from the top of the village (Zmorašnje selo) to the harbor (Porat), stopping at each stage, notably at the central square (Ravanac) and the Saint-Roch chapel (Sveti Rok), to deliver its musical performance. Although the horns produce only two or three notes, the rhythm is sustained by improvised percussion (flatirons, old metal tools).

The ritual reaches its most unusual dimension at dusk, when the musicians slowly enter the sea up to their necks, continuing to play while keeping their instruments out of the water. Finally, it is the ensemble that accompanies and marks the official closing of the festival with the solemn laying down of the flag, signifying the end of the celebrations for the year.

== Legacy and transmission ==
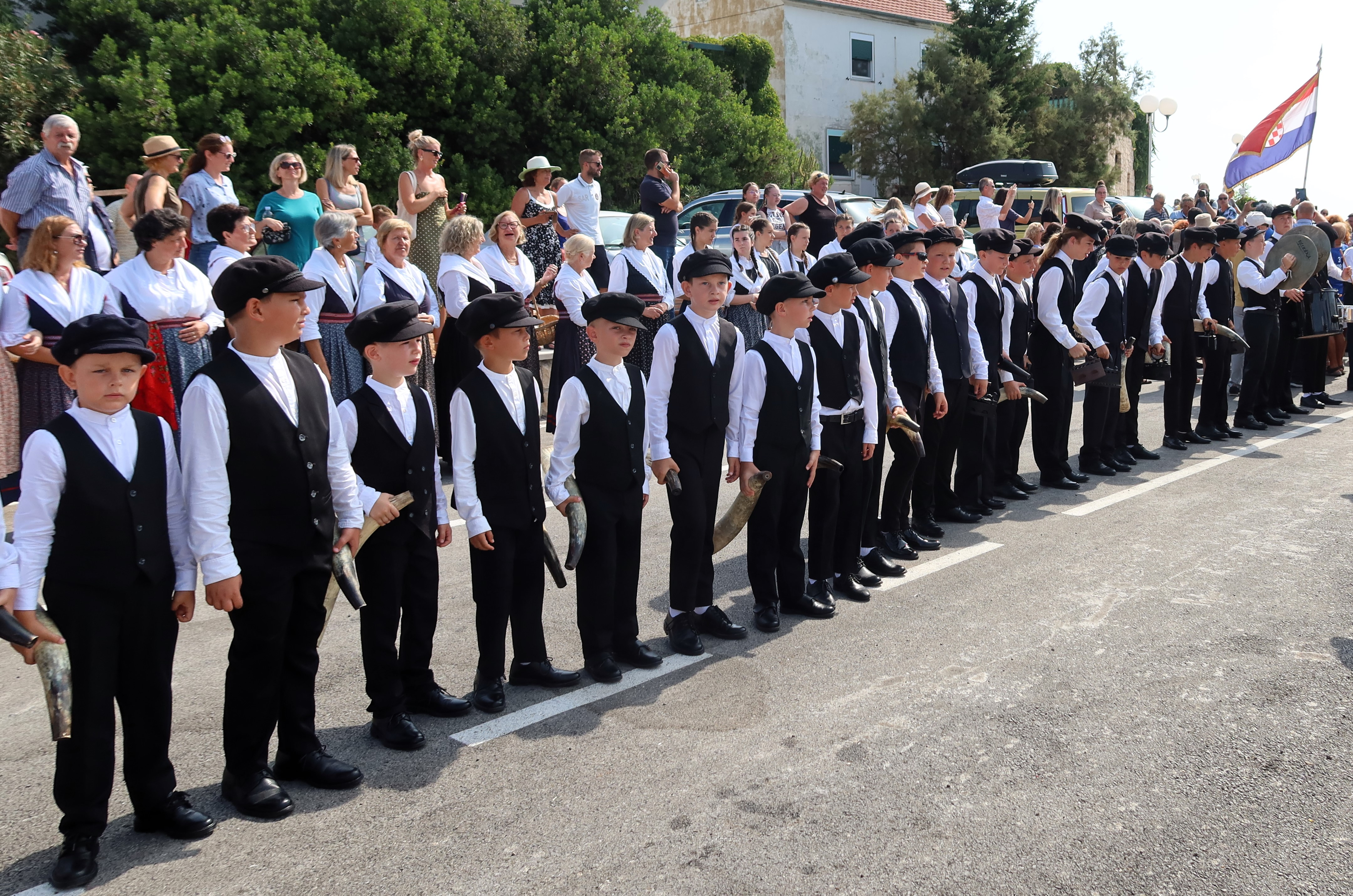
Pulići of the Tovareća mužika in Sali, Dugi Otok

Beyond the summer festival, the Tovareća mužika has become the cultural emblem of the locality. It systematically accompanies the cultural, festive, and sporting events related to Sali throughout the year. The group also plays a role in promoting tourism for Sali and the island of Dugi Otok, performing at carnivals and folklore gatherings in Croatia and abroad.

The continuation of the tradition is ensured by the Pulići (literally the "foals"), an ensemble made up of village children. Dressed identically to their elders and equipped with the same accessories, they parade and practice according to the same codes. These future members of the official formation sometimes substitute for the adults during certain performances, thus guaranteeing the transmission of Sali's musical heritage.

In 2012, the Tovareća mužika was classified as an intangible cultural asset of the Republic of Croatia (reference Z-5723). A request for inscription on the UNESCO World Heritage list was submitted the same year.

== Gallery ==
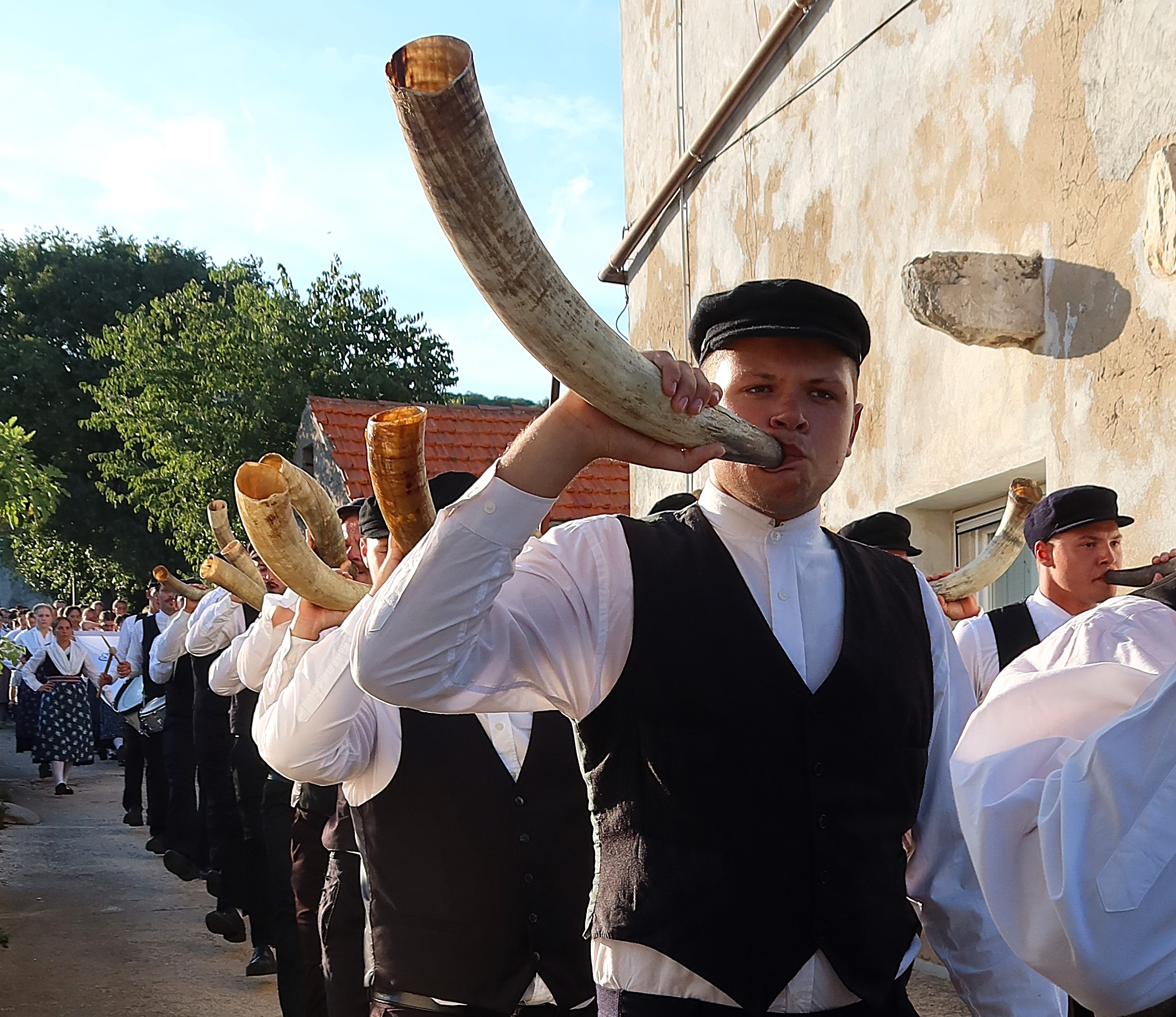
Opening of the Saljske užance

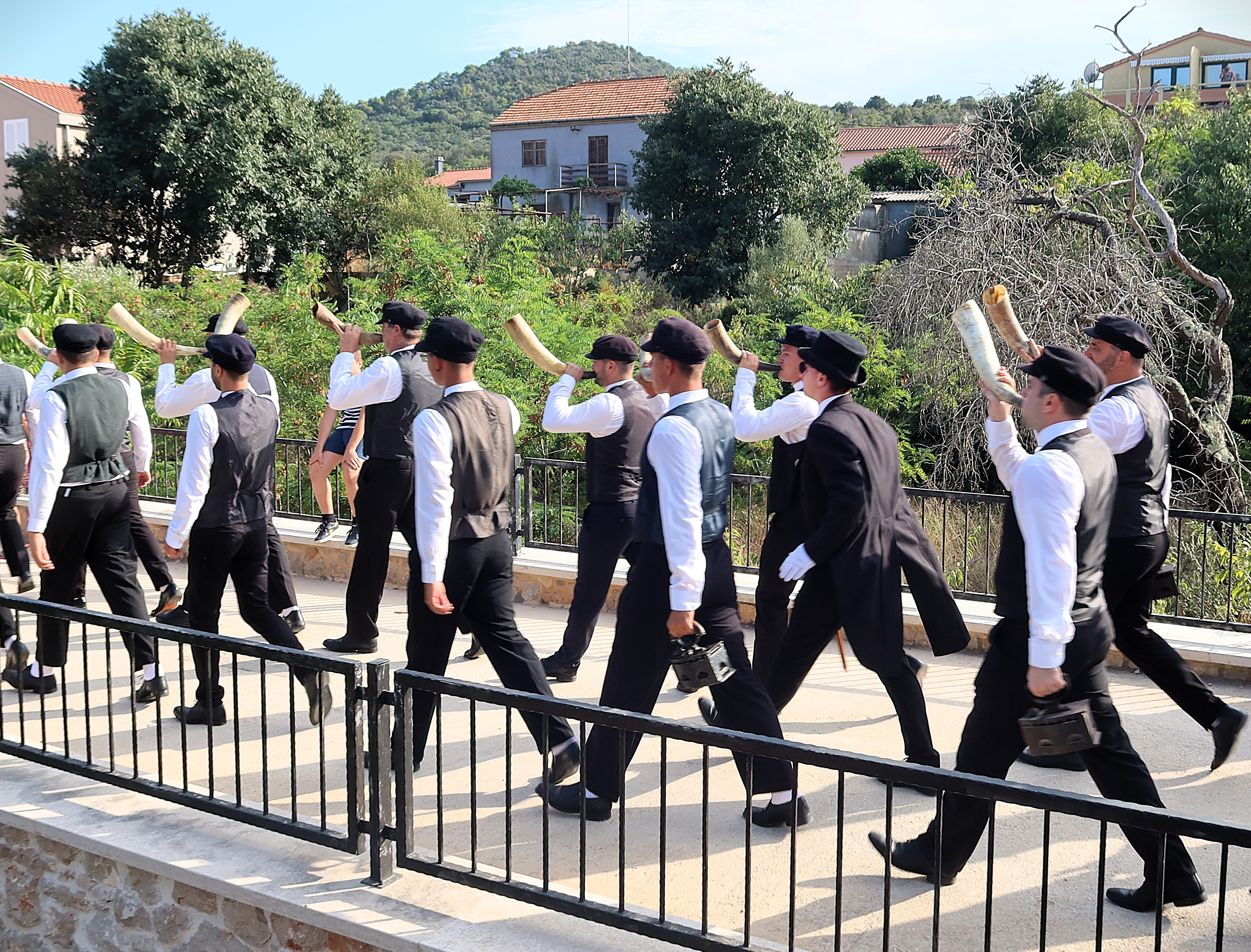
The musicians

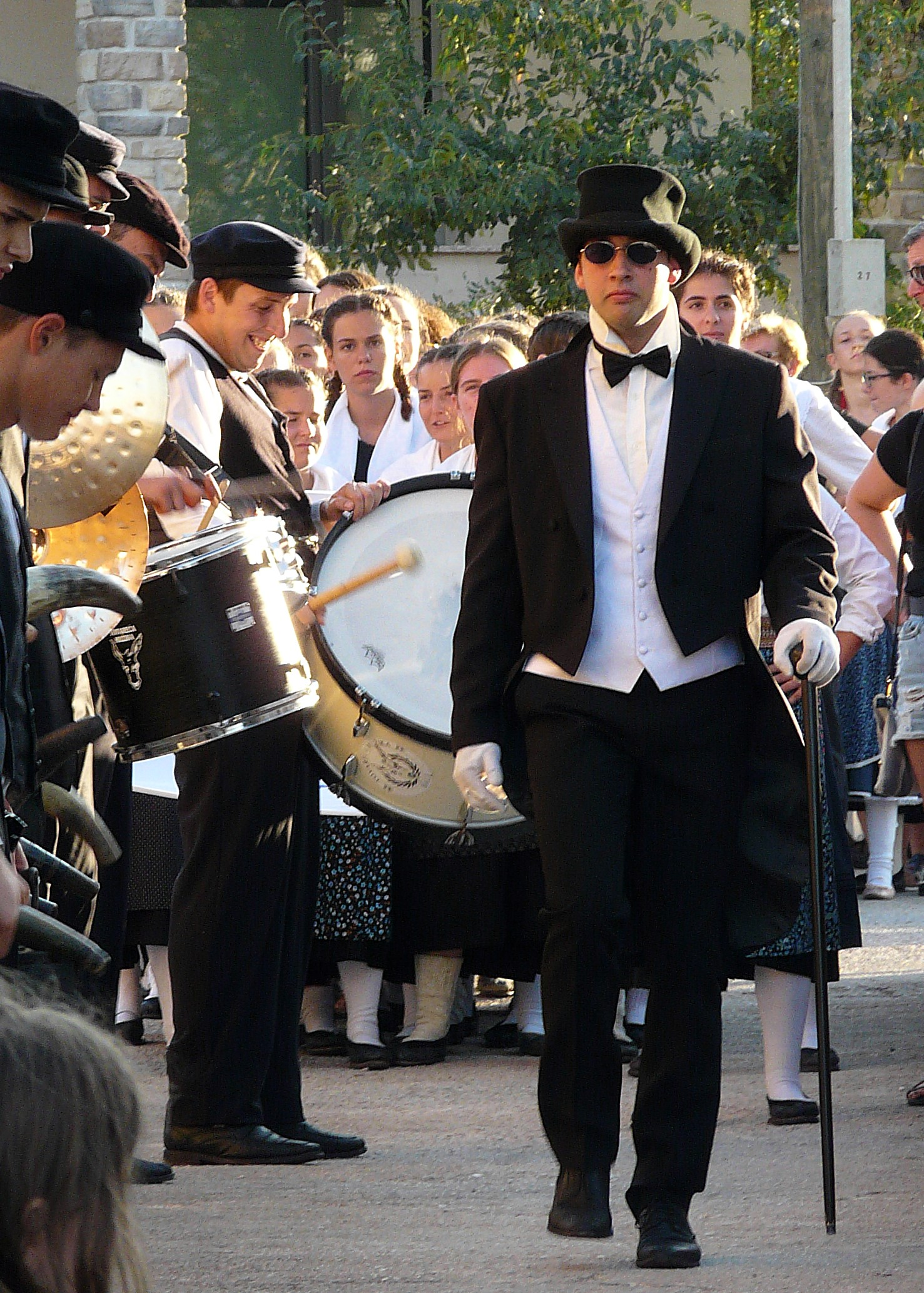
The meštar, leader of the group

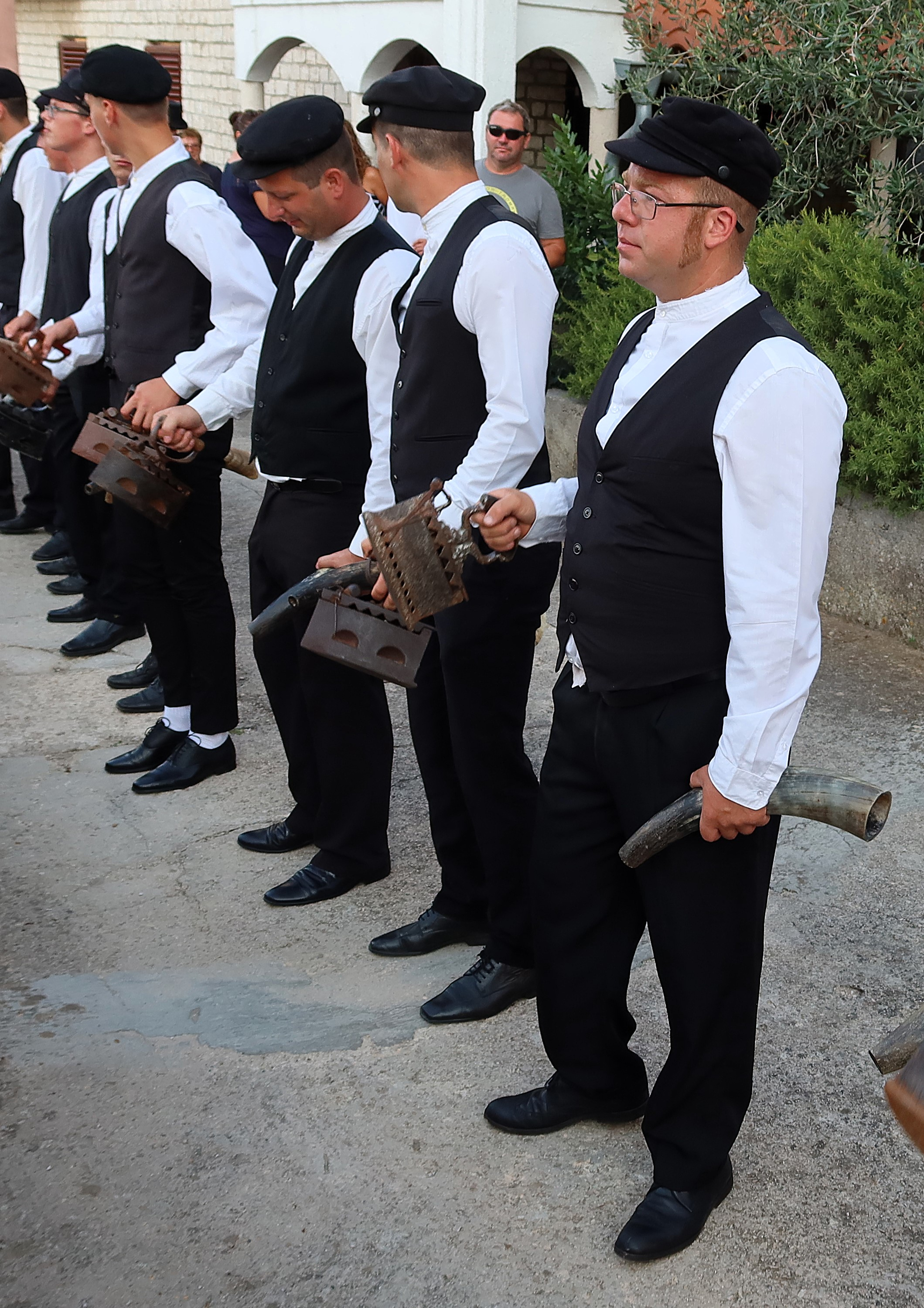
Instruments: horn and flatiron

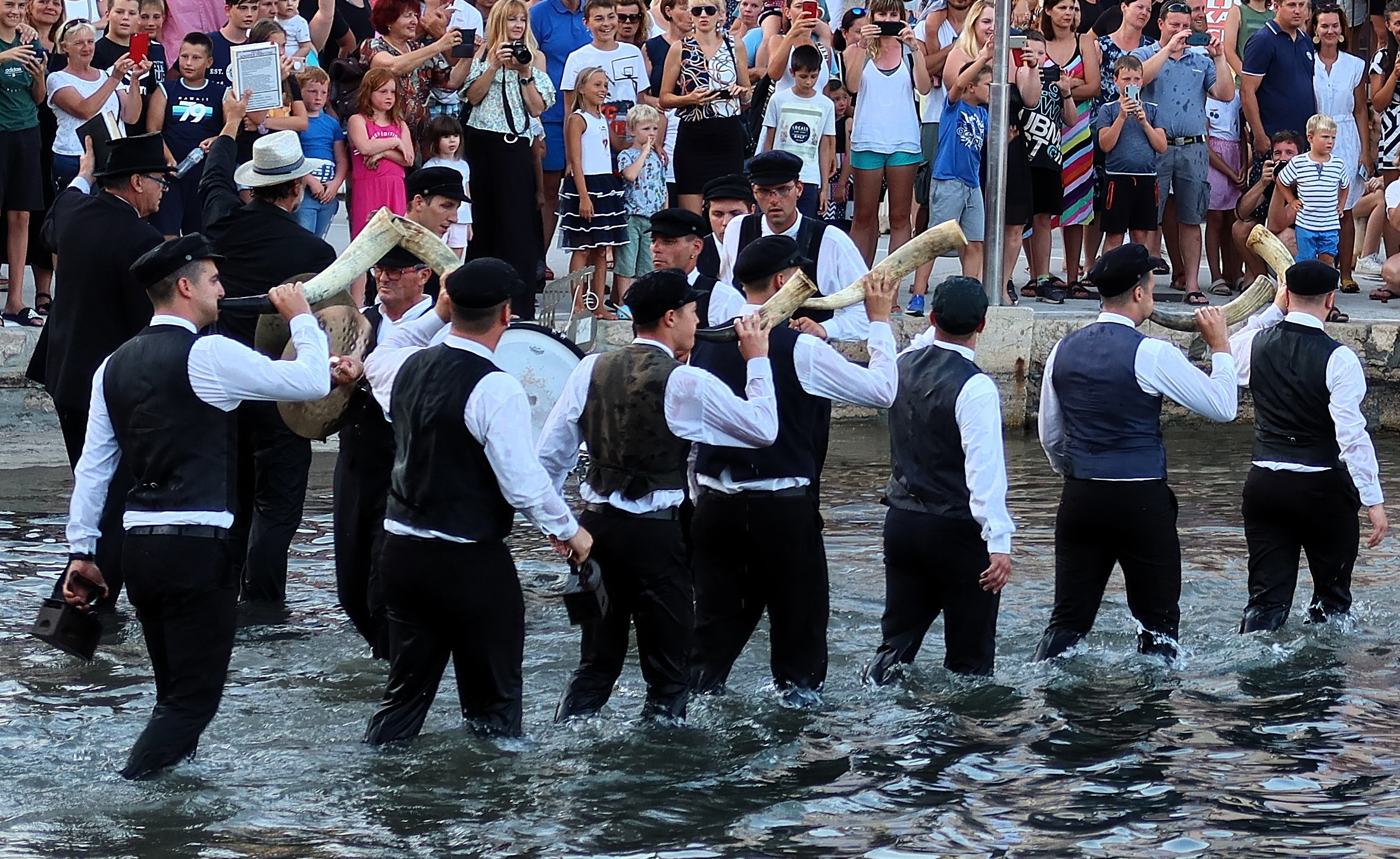
Final immersion in the sea
