= Veli Rat Lighthouse =

Lighthouse in Croatia

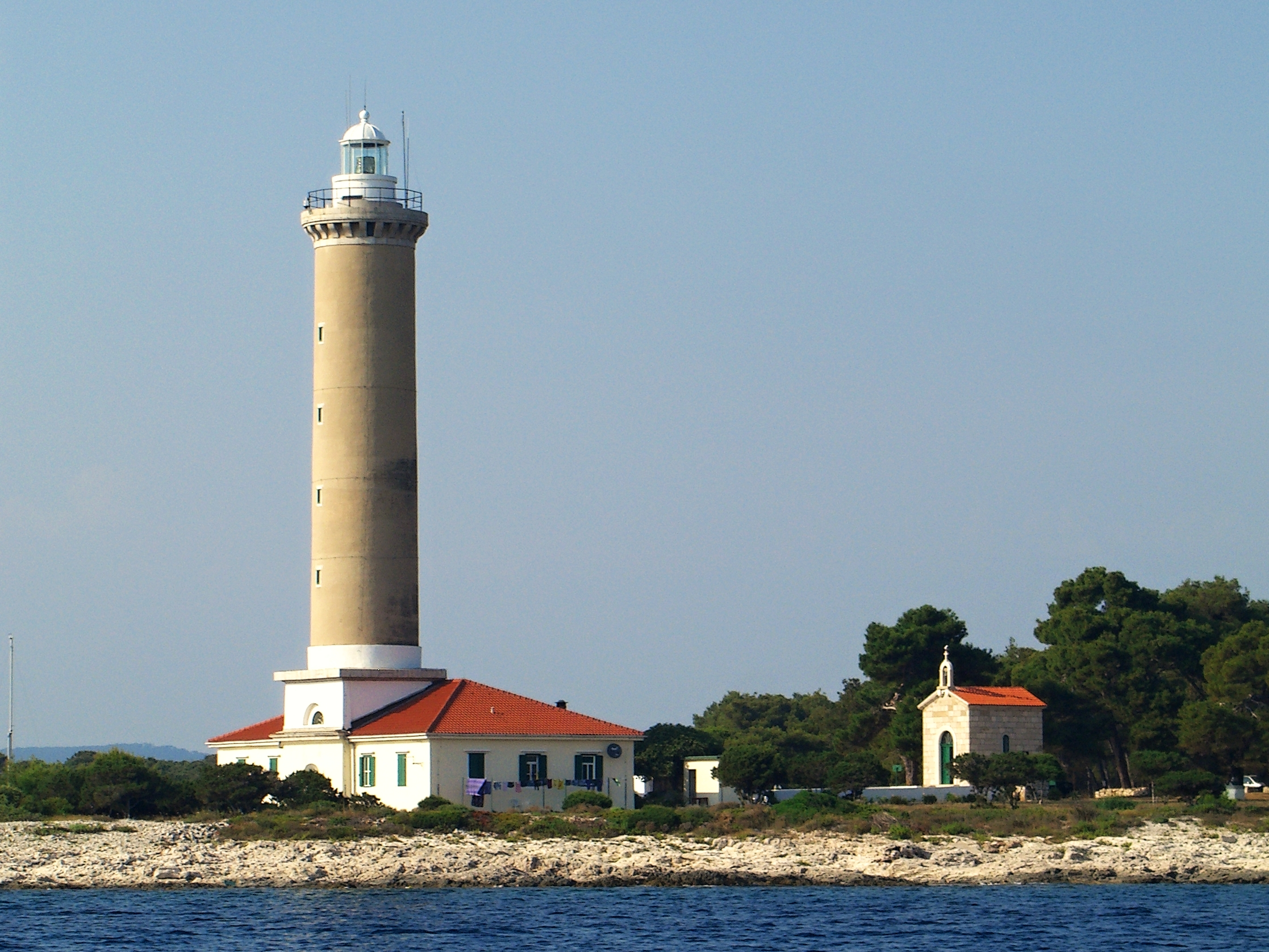
- Location: Veli Rat, Croatia
- Coordinates: 44.152028°N 14.820235°E

Tower
- Constructed: 1849
- Construction: Stone
- Height: 36 metres (118 ft)
- Shape: Cylindrical tower rising from a 1-story keeper's house
- Markings: White

Light
- Focal height: 41 metres (135 ft)
- Range: 22 nautical miles (41 km; 25 mi)
- Characteristic: W Fl(2) 20s

Veli Rat Lighthouse is an active lighthouse on the Croatian island of Dugi Otok, and is a well-known landmark near the village of the same name.

The single storey keeper's house is built around the base of the 36m masonry tower, which has a white lantern and single gallery. The yellow walls of the house were reputedly painted using a mixture that was coloured by the use of thousands of eggs. This was allegedly to give better consistency and protection against the salt air.

At a height of 41m above the sea, the light has a range of 22 nautical miles and consists of two flashes of white light every twelve seconds. Veli Rat along with a number of other Croatian lighthouses still retains a lighthouse keeper. In 2014 the serving keeper was Zvone, who along with his wife and family live on site. Since 2000, rooms within the lighthouse have also been made available for rent as holiday accommodation.

In 2010, Veli Rat in conjunction with the lighthouses at Vir and Tajer were depicted in a set of commemorative stamps by the Croatian postal service Hrvatska pošta.

== See also ==
- List of lighthouses in Croatia
