= D407 road =

Road in Croatia

D407 state road

Route information
- Length: 3.8 km (2.4 mi)

Major junctions
- From: D8 in Zadar
- To: Zadar ferry port

Location
- Country: Croatia
- Counties: Zadar
- Major cities: Zadar

Highway system
- Highways in Croatia

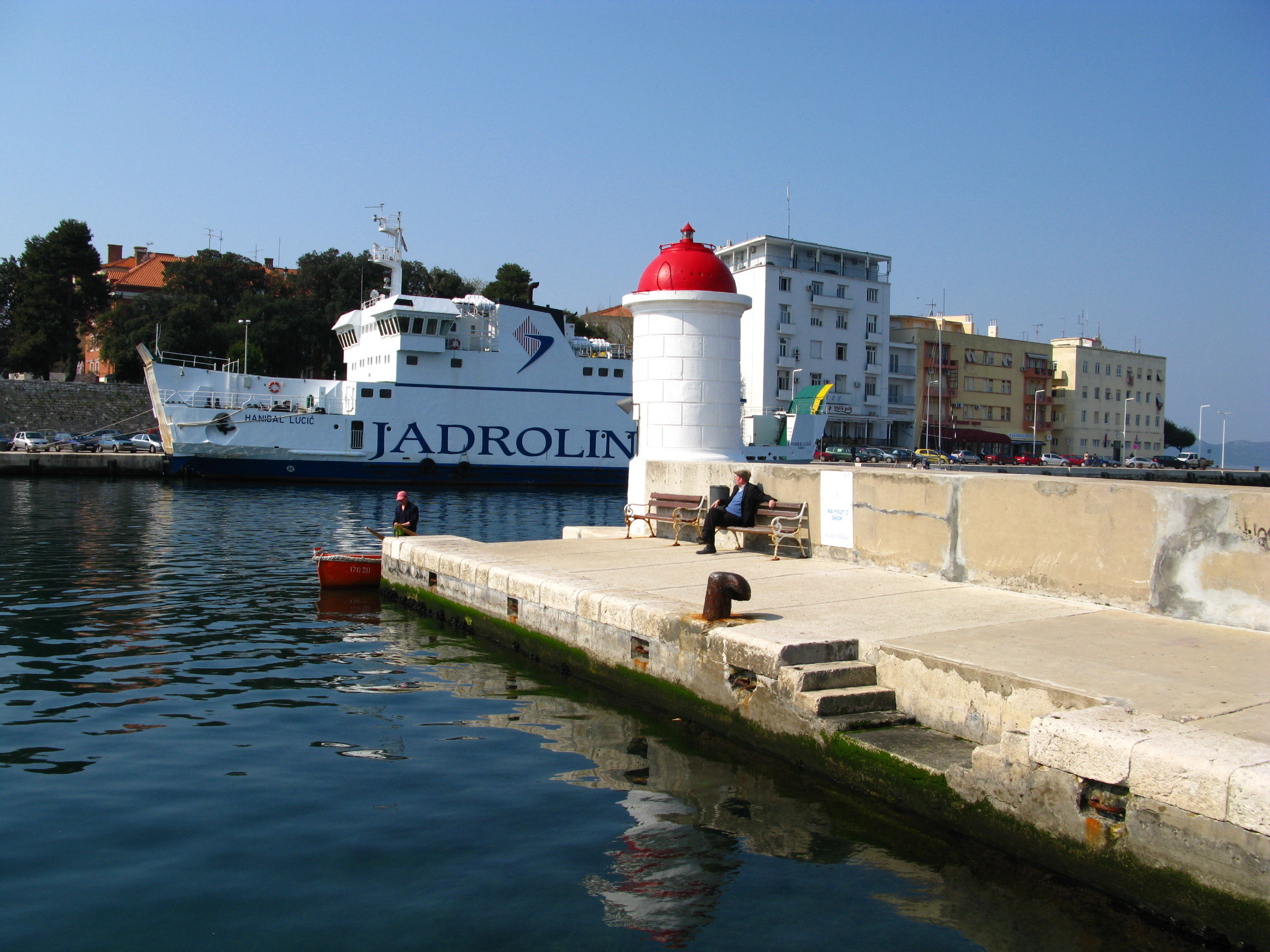
Zadar ferry port

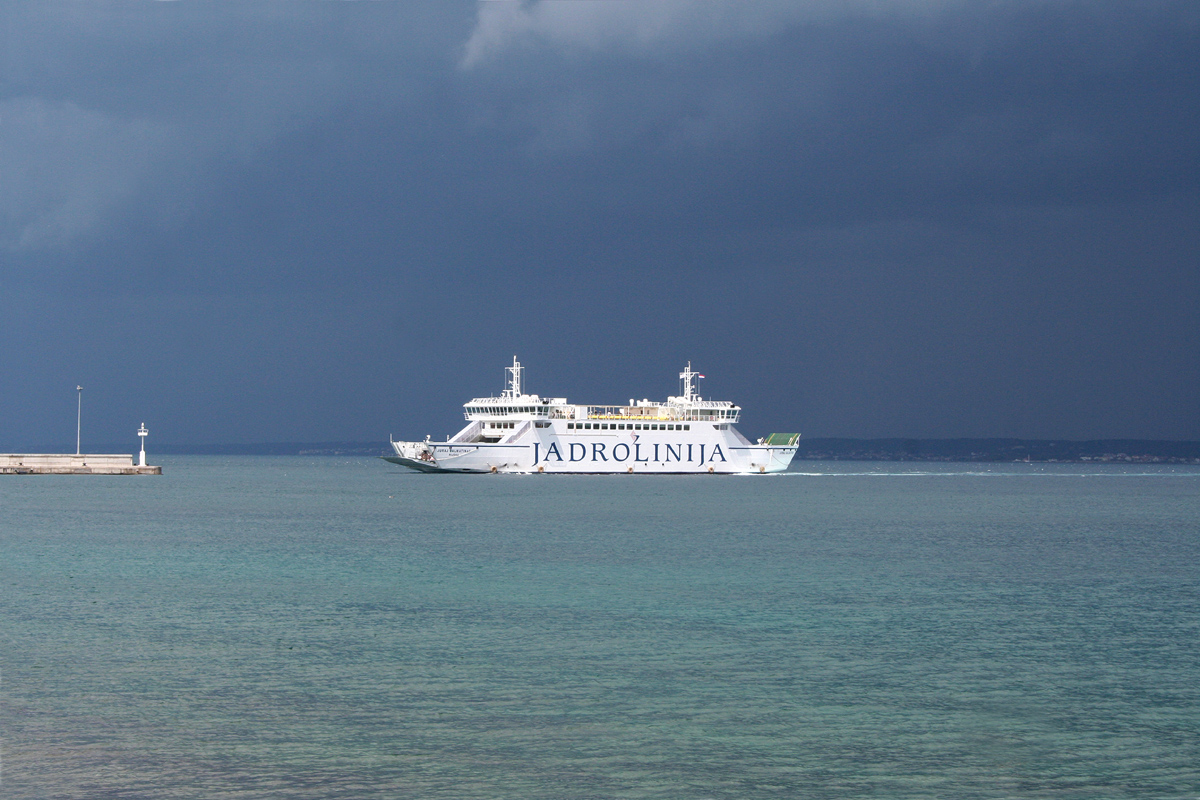
Zadar-Preko ferry

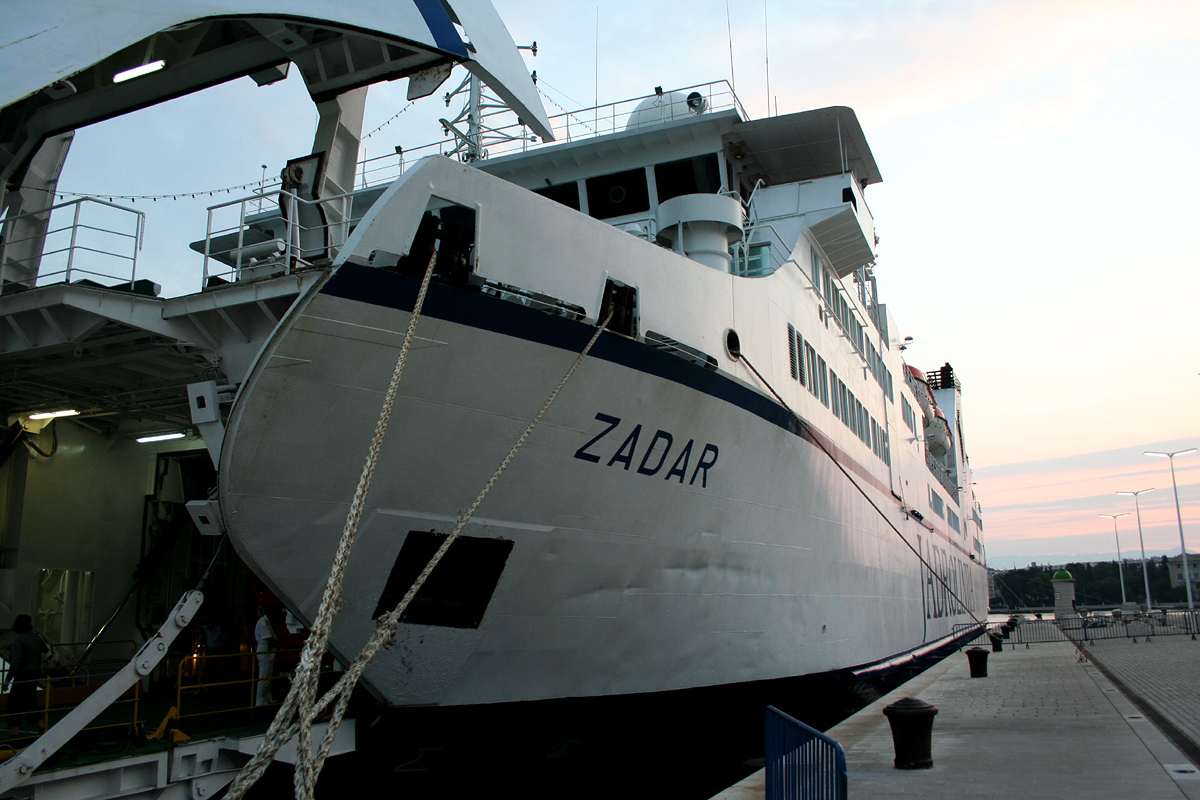
A ferry embarking vehicles and passengers in the port

D407 branches off to the southwest from D8 in Zadar towards Zadar ferry port - ferry access to Preko, Ugljan Island (D110), Brbinj and Sali, Dugi otok (D124), as well as Ancona, Italy. The road is 3.8 km (2.4 mi) long.

The road, as well as all other state roads in Croatia, is managed and maintained by Hrvatske ceste, state owned company.

== Traffic volume ==
D407 traffic is not counted directly, however Hrvatske ceste, operator of the road reports number of vehicles using ferry service flying from Zadar port, accessed by the D407 road, thereby allowing the D407 traffic volume to be deduced. Substantial variations between annual (AADT) and summer (ASDT) traffic volumes are attributed to the fact that the road serves as a connection carrying substantial tourist traffic to Zadar area islands, while the D8 state road provides quick access to A1 motorway Zadar 1 and Zadar 2 interchanges, either directly, or via D424 state road.

D407 traffic volume
Road	Counting site	AADT	ASDT	Notes
D407	401 Zadar-Silba-Mali Lošinj	18	51	Traffic to the islands of Silba and Lošinj only.
D407	433 Zadar-Sestrunj-Molat	13	26	Traffic to islands of Sestrunj and Molat only.
D407	434 Zadar-Brbinj	135	317	Traffic to Dugi otok only.
D407	431 Zadar-Preko	713	1,314	Traffic to Ugljan Island only.
D407	435 Zadar-Iž-Rava	28	58	Traffic to Ugljan Island only.
D407	51 Zadar-Ancona	51	51*	Traffic to Ancona, Italy only.
D407	Zadar ferry port (total)	958	1,817	Total D407 traffic volume in Zadar ferry port.
* There are no ASDT figures available for Zadar-Ancona line. AADT figure is used instead.

== Road junctions and populated areas ==
D407 junctions/populated areas
Type	Slip roads/Notes
	Zadar; D8 to Rijeka and Maslenica (to the north) and Šibenik and A1 motorway connection road (to the south). Eastern terminus of the road.
	Zadar ferry port - ferry access to Preko, Ugljan Island (D110), Brbinj and Sali, Dugi otok (D124), Mali Lošinj (D100) as well as to Iž, Rava, Molat, Sestrunj, Zverinac, Ist, Silba, Olib and Premuda. Western terminus of the road.
