= Božava =

- Village
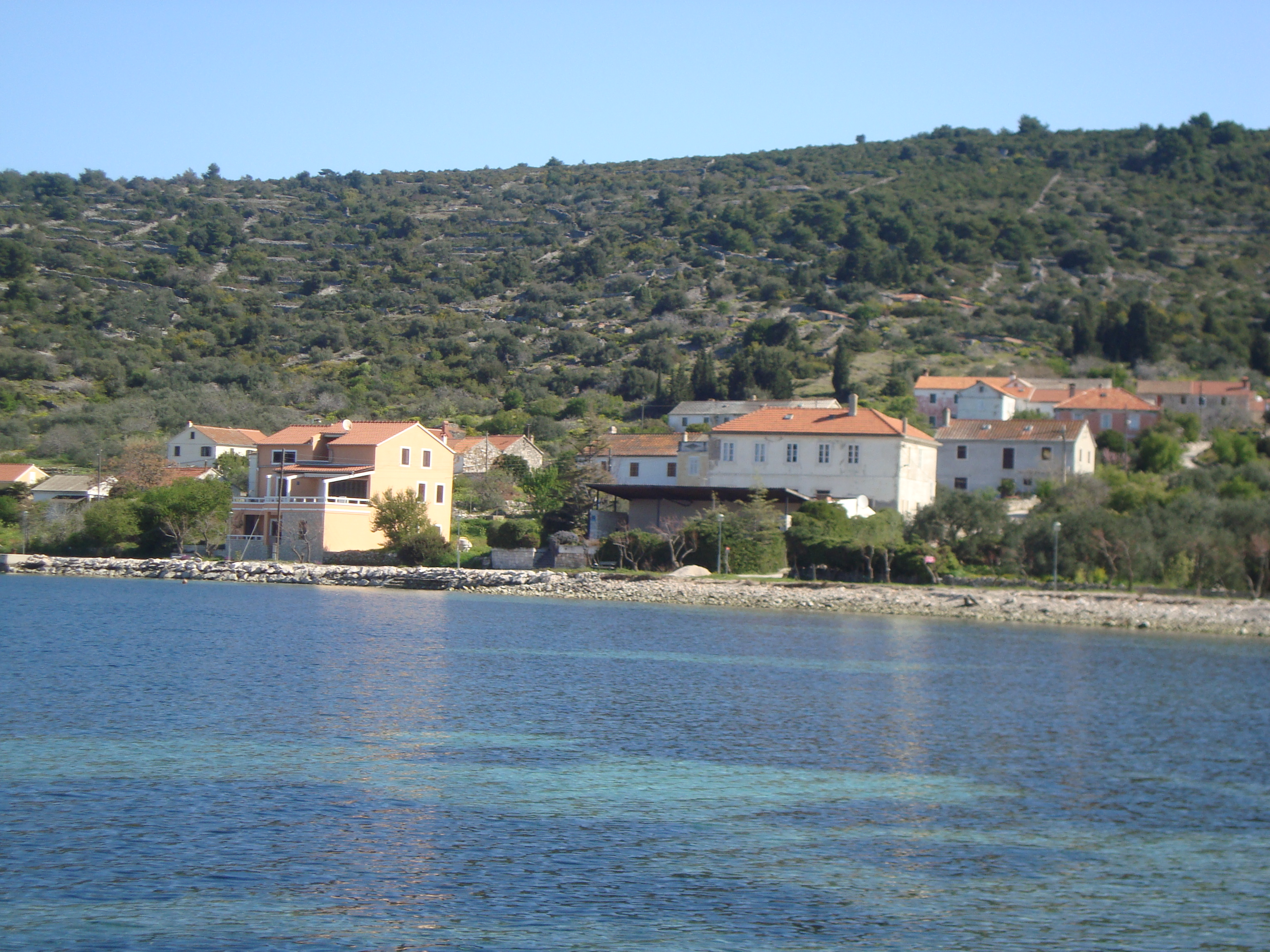
- Country: Croatia
- County: Zadar County
- Municipality: Sali

Area
  - Total: 3.2 km^{2} (1.2 sq mi)

Population (2021)
  - Total: 118
  - Density: 37/km^{2} (96/sq mi)
- Time zone: UTC+1 (CET)
  - Summer (DST): UTC+2 (CEST)
- Area code: 23286 Božava

Božava is a Croatian village on the island of Dugi Otok.

== Climate ==
Since records began in 1997, the highest temperature recorded at the local weather station was 39.0 °C (102.2 °F), on 10 August 2017. The coldest temperature was −5.0 °C (23.0 °F), on both 13 February 2012 and 7 January 2017.

== Demographics ==
Village of Božava: Population trends 1857–2021
v

population	180		195	239	277	261	335	248	260	269	262	248	139	166	127	116	118
	1857	1869	1880	1890	1900	1910	1921	1931	1948	1953	1961	1971	1981	1991	2001	2011	2021

Note:Includes Dragove in 1869. Sources: Croatian Bureau of Statistics publications

== Bibliography ==
- Modrić, Oliver (2025-01-27). "Prijenos i zbrinjavanje gradiva župnih arhiva u Arhiv Zadarske nadbiskupije" [Transfer and storage of materials of the parish archives to the Archives of the Archdiocese of Zadar]. Vjesnik dalmatinskih arhiva (in Serbo-Croatian). 5: 109–124. doi:10.58565/vda.5.1.5. eISSN 2806-8459.
