= Veli Rat =

- Village
- Location within Croatia
- Coordinates: 44.142°N 14.852°E
- Country: Croatia
- County: Zadar County
- Municipality: Sali

Area
  - Total: 1.6 sq mi (4.1 km^{2})

Population (2021)
  - Total: 91
  - Density: 57/sq mi (22/km^{2})
- Time zone: UTC+1 (CET)
  - Summer (DST): UTC+2 (CEST)

Veli Rat is a village in Croatia on the island of Dugi Otok, with a population of around 300 people. It is connected to other villages on the island by the D109 highway. Veli Rat's population increases during the summer because of the tourists. To the northwest of the village is the Veli Rat lighthouse.

== Bibliography ==
- Cvitanović, Vladislav (1960). "Prilog toponomastici zadarskog kraja" [A Contribution to the Toponymics of the Zadar Region]. Radovi Instituta Jugoslavenske akademije znanosti i umjetnosti u Zadru (in Serbo-Croatian) (6–7): 539–550. ISSN 0449-3672.
- Kozličić, Mithad (2013). "Veli Rat i njegovo značenje u dužobalnim i prekomorskim plovidbama Jadranom u peljarima 17.-20. stoljeća" [Veli Rat and its Significance in Coastal and Open Sea Adriatic Voyages for Pilots of the 17th-20th Centuries]. Veli Rat (in Croatian). Zadar: Sveučilište u Zadru. pp. 251–279. ISBN 978-953-331-047-3.
- Modrić, Oliver (2025-01-27). "Prijenos i zbrinjavanje gradiva župnih arhiva u Arhiv Zadarske nadbiskupije" [Transfer and storage of materials of the parish archives to the Archives of the Archdiocese of Zadar]. Vjesnik dalmatinskih arhiva (in Serbo-Croatian). 5: 109–124. doi:10.58565/vda.5.1.5. eISSN 2806-8459.
