= Sali, Croatia =

Sali
- Municipality
- Općina Sali; Municipality of Sali
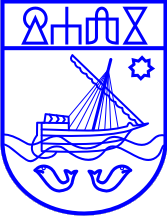
- Coat of arms
- Interactive map of Sali
- Location of Sali in Croatia
- Coordinates: 43°56′N 15°10′E
- Country: Croatia
- Region: Dalmatia
- County: Zadar County

Government
  - Municipal mayor: Zoran Morović (HSS)

Area
  - Municipality: 124.2 km^{2} (48.0 sq mi)
  - Urban: 33.8 km^{2} (13.1 sq mi)

Population (2021)
  - Municipality: 1,746
  - Density: 14.06/km^{2} (36.41/sq mi)
  - Urban: 726
  - Urban density: 21.5/km^{2} (55.6/sq mi)
- Time zone: UTC+1 (CET)
  - Summer (DST): UTC+2 (CEST)
- Postal code: 23281 Sali
- Vehicle registration: ZD
- Website: www.opcina-sali.hr

Sali is a village and a municipality in Croatia in the Zadar County. The municipality consists of the island of Dugi Otok and surrounding islands and islets.

== Demographics ==
In 2021, the municipality had 1,746 residents in the following 12 settlements:

- Božava, population 118
- Brbinj, population 70
- Dragove, population 18
- Luka, population 124
- Sali, population 726
- Savar, population 35
- Soline, population 59
- Veli Rat, population 91
- Verunić, population 54
- Zaglav, population 171
- Zverinac, population 55
- Žman, population 225
Sali: Population trends 1857–2021
v

population	2240	2534	2724	3268	3837	3981	4769	4329	4828	4740	4246	4065	2346	2932	1820	1698	1746
	1857	1869	1880	1890	1900	1910	1921	1931	1948	1953	1961	1971	1981	1991	2001	2011	2021

Sources: Croatian Bureau of Statistics publications

== Gallery ==
1832 journal entry by Mate Puhov of Sali, lay Glagolite

== Bibliography ==
- Modrić, Oliver (2025-01-27). "Prijenos i zbrinjavanje gradiva župnih arhiva u Arhiv Zadarske nadbiskupije" [Transfer and storage of materials of the parish archives to the Archives of the Archdiocese of Zadar]. Vjesnik dalmatinskih arhiva (in Serbo-Croatian). 5: 109–124. doi:10.58565/vda.5.1.5. eISSN 2806-8459.
