= Dragove =

- Location within Croatia
- Coordinates: 44°07′N 14°56′E
- Country: Croatia
- County: Zadar
- Municipality: Sali

Area
  - Total: 11.4 km^{2} (4.4 sq mi)

Population (2021)
  - Total: 18
  - Density: 1.6/km^{2} (4.1/sq mi)
- Time zone: UTC+1 (CET)
  - Summer (DST): UTC+2 (CEST)

Dragove is a village in the north-eastern part of the island of Dugi Otok in Zadar County, Croatia. Dragove is located on the regional road running along the entire island. The population is 35 (2011 census).

The surroundings were populated as early as antique times (Roman remains below the hill of Dumbovica), while the first Croatian settlement was mentioned in the sources already in the 14th century. Later, many Croats fleeing the Turkish invasions of Bosnia settled in Dragove. The Drago family from Zadar had its estates here, purchased in the 15th century by another Zadar family, the Salomonis. The parish church of St. Leonardo was built in the 12th and 13th centuries. The small church of Our Lady of Dumbovica, mentioned in the 15th century, is on a beautiful location, with a nice view of the surroundings. During the 1950s, Dragove's population reached about 500 people.
