= Žman =

Coordinates: 43°58′N 15°07′E

- Village
- Interactive map of Žman
- Country: Croatia

Area
  - Total: 4.6 sq mi (11.9 km^{2})

Population (2021)
  - Total: 225
  - Density: 49.0/sq mi (18.9/km^{2})
- Time zone: UTC+1 (CET)
  - Summer (DST): UTC+2 (CEST)

Žman is a village on Dugi Otok island, in Zadar County, Croatia.
