= Soline, Sali =

Coordinates: 44°08′19″N 14°52′48″E

Soline
- Village
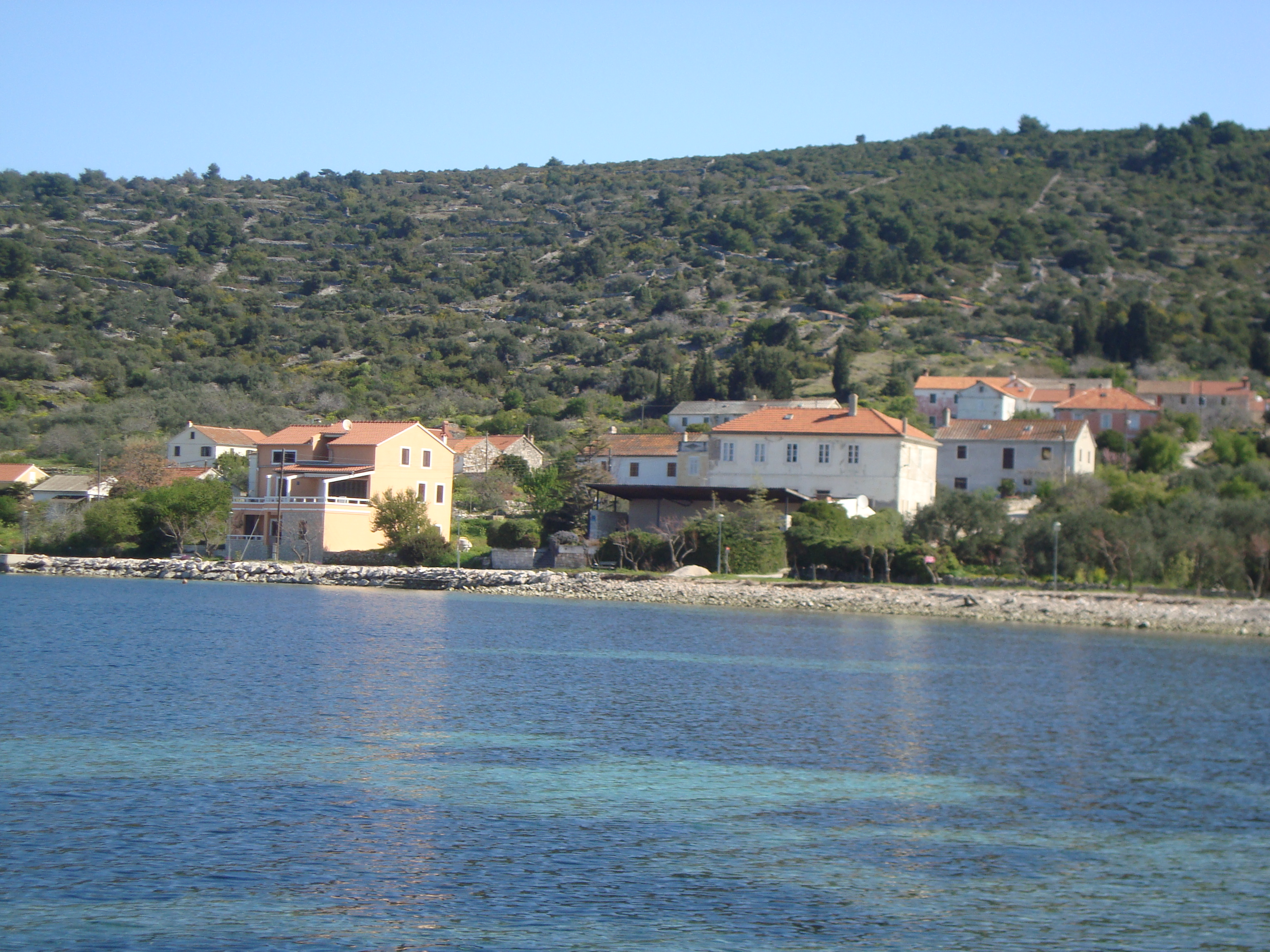
- Country: Croatia
- County: Zadar County
- Municipality: Sali

Area
  - Total: 7.9 km^{2} (3.1 sq mi)

Population (2021)
  - Total: 59
  - Density: 7.5/km^{2} (19/sq mi)
- Time zone: UTC+1 (CET)
  - Summer (DST): UTC+2 (CEST)
- Area code: 23000
- Website: https://www.facebook.com/groups/4214848844/

Soline is a small Croatian village on the island of Dugi Otok. It is divided in two parts: Bura and Japar, located on Solišćica Luka Bay. The village was named after the old salt pans in the bay.

Soline was first mentioned in documents from 1114 C.E., making it one of the oldest settlements on Dugi Otok.

== Population ==
In 1527 the records showed that Soline, along with neighboring towns Bozava and Veli, had a total of 225 residents. Since then the population has fluctuated as follows:

- 1818 - 165
- 1843 - 189
- 1856 - 209
- 1873 - 256
- 1890 - 325
- 1900 - 366
- 1913 - 395
- 1927 - 400
- 1948 - 386
- 1953 - 376
- 1981 - 145

The population listed in 2011 was 39 with a total of 26 households. The village has 100 housing units and 46 permanent apartments.

Population trends 1857-2011
v

population	384	376	347	356	145	73	66	39
	1948	1953	1961	1971	1981	1991	2001	2011

Sources: Croatian Bureau of Statistics publications

== Economy and tourism ==
Chief occupations include farming, grape cultivation for wine making, olive growing, fruit growing, and fishing. In recent years, tourism and hospitality services have rapidly developed on the regional road running along Dugi Island from the village of Sali on the south end to Božava and Veli Rat on the north end. There is a post office and ATM in Sali.

== Monuments ==
=== Church of St. Jacob ===
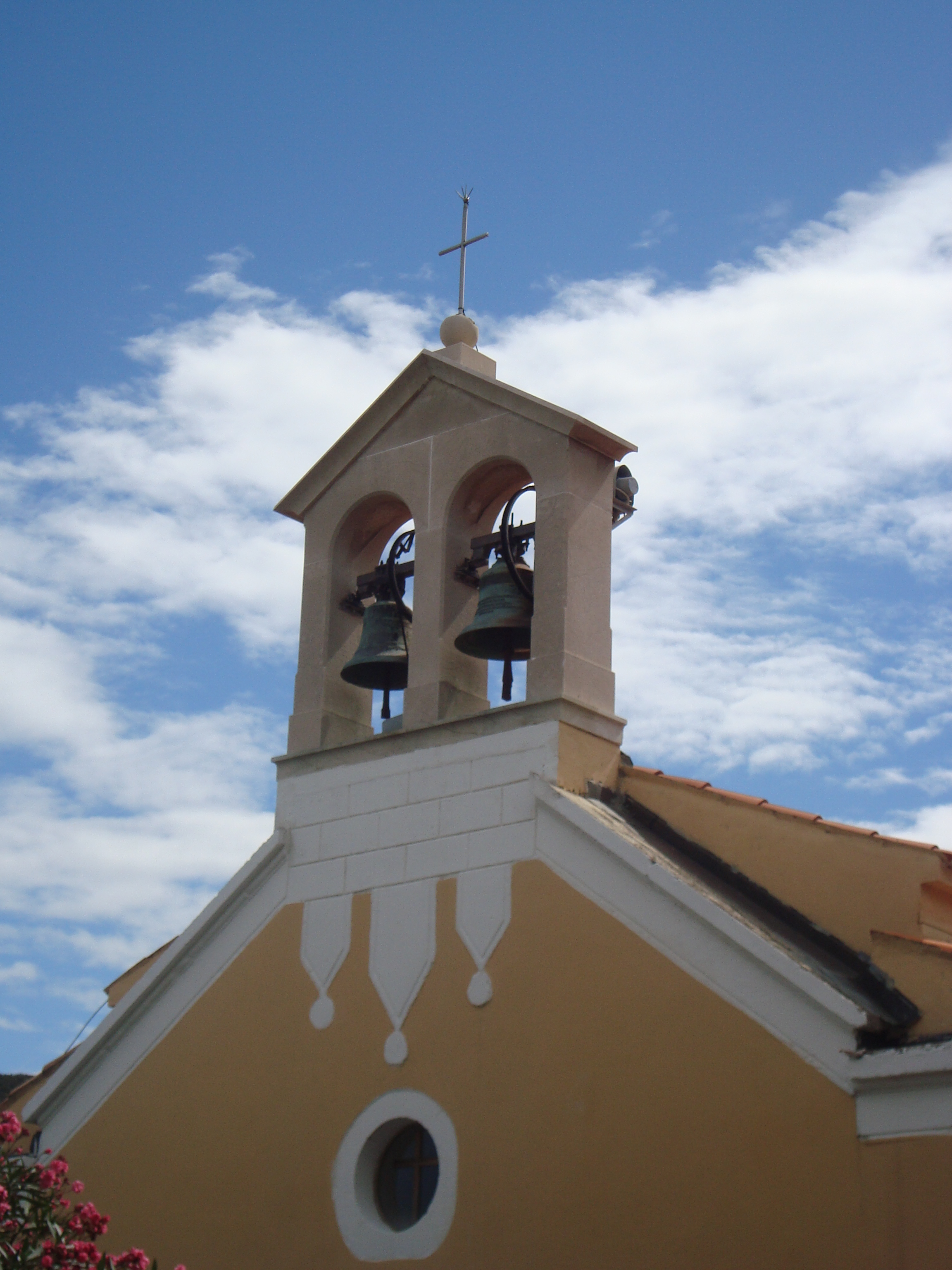
Crkva sv. Jakova

The Church of St. Jacob the apostle was first mentioned in the 15th century. In 1517, the church was restored and covered with stone slabs. During the same year, Glagolitic letters were carved into the lintel of the portal. The inscription was destroyed by a lightning strike in 1879. The parish church houses a valuable Gothic chalice on which a Latin inscription is engraved testifying that he built the Church of SS. Gregory of Vrana "pro anima Drage filiale Matei Bonmig – for Drage, the daughter of Mate." A graveyard is located near the church parish.

=== Glagolitic madrikula St. Jacob ===
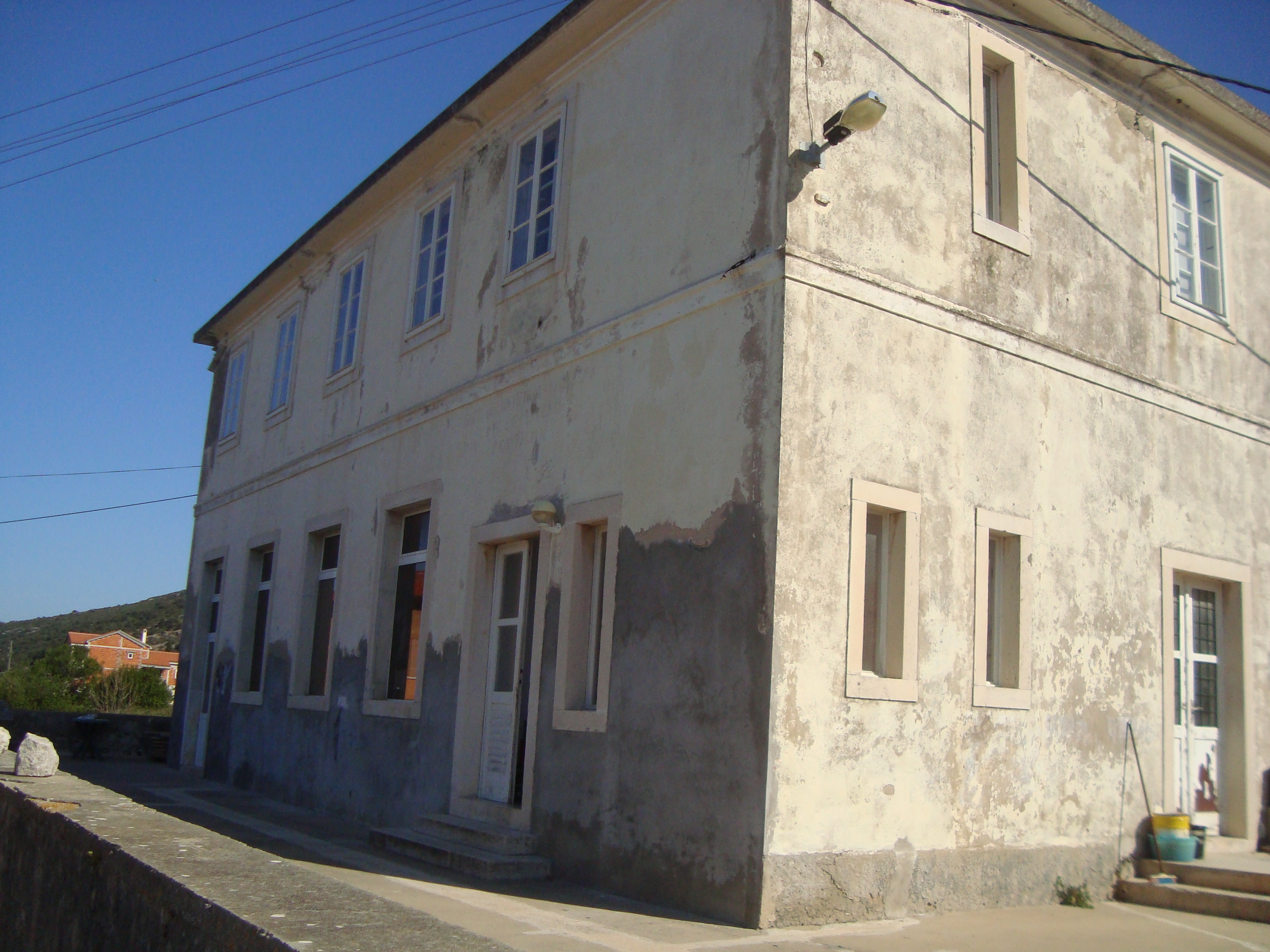
School

Glagolitic madrikula St. Jacob is the way in which the priests of Soline track the Brotherhood of St. Jacob and the rules of the confraternity (chapters) carried out in practice. The whole madrikula is written in Croatian, cursive Glagolitic, and a little Latin. In this madrikuli there is also the data for two schools whose records did not survive.

==== Church bells ====
On the facade of the parish church Jacob rises an antique white tower. In 1923, two bells were placed on it. On the larger bell the inscriptions read: "Lady of the Rosary, St. Fabian and Sebastian, pray for us!" Acquired Parish Solinksa pastorate Don Srećko Pavic. The other bell bears the inscription: "Solin – St. Jacob. Jacob Bell Foundry Cukrov – Split – 1923 Lightning and thunder, deliver us, O Lord!"

=== Beaches ===
Solišćica beach is a popular swimming spot. Another popular location, Sakarun beach is a 400-meter stretch of white sand located south of the village on the inside of Sakarun Cove. A bar and a bakery are located on the beach.

== Transportation ==
The main road on Dugi took links Soline with other towns on the island and the ferry port in Bribinj. Year-round shipping links the mainland and seasonal connections to Ancona, Italy. Ferry connections to Jadrolinija with a capacity of 70 cars are available. A direct connection between Zadar on the mainland and neighboring Bozava and Brbinj on Dugi took is available. A bus line connects the towns on Dugi Island with the main ferry port. The only gas station on Dugi took is 33 kilometres (21 mi) south of Božava in the village of Zaglav. There is a passenger only catamaran from Zaglav and Sali to Zadar operated by G&V Line Iadera https://www.gv-zadar.com/

== Bibliography ==
- Modrić, Oliver (2025-01-27). "Prijenos i zbrinjavanje gradiva župnih arhiva u Arhiv Zadarske nadbiskupije" [Transfer and storage of materials of the parish archives to the Archives of the Archdiocese of Zadar]. Vjesnik dalmatinskih arhiva (in Serbo-Croatian). 5: 109–124. doi:10.58565/vda.5.1.5. eISSN 2806-8459.

== Sources ==
- "Soline | Zadarske nadbiskupije". Zupe.zadarskanadbiskupija.hr.
- "Island Dugi Otok Beaches". CroBeaches.com.
