= Telašćica =

Bay in Dugi Otok, Croatia

Coordinates: 43°54′00″N 15°09′36″E

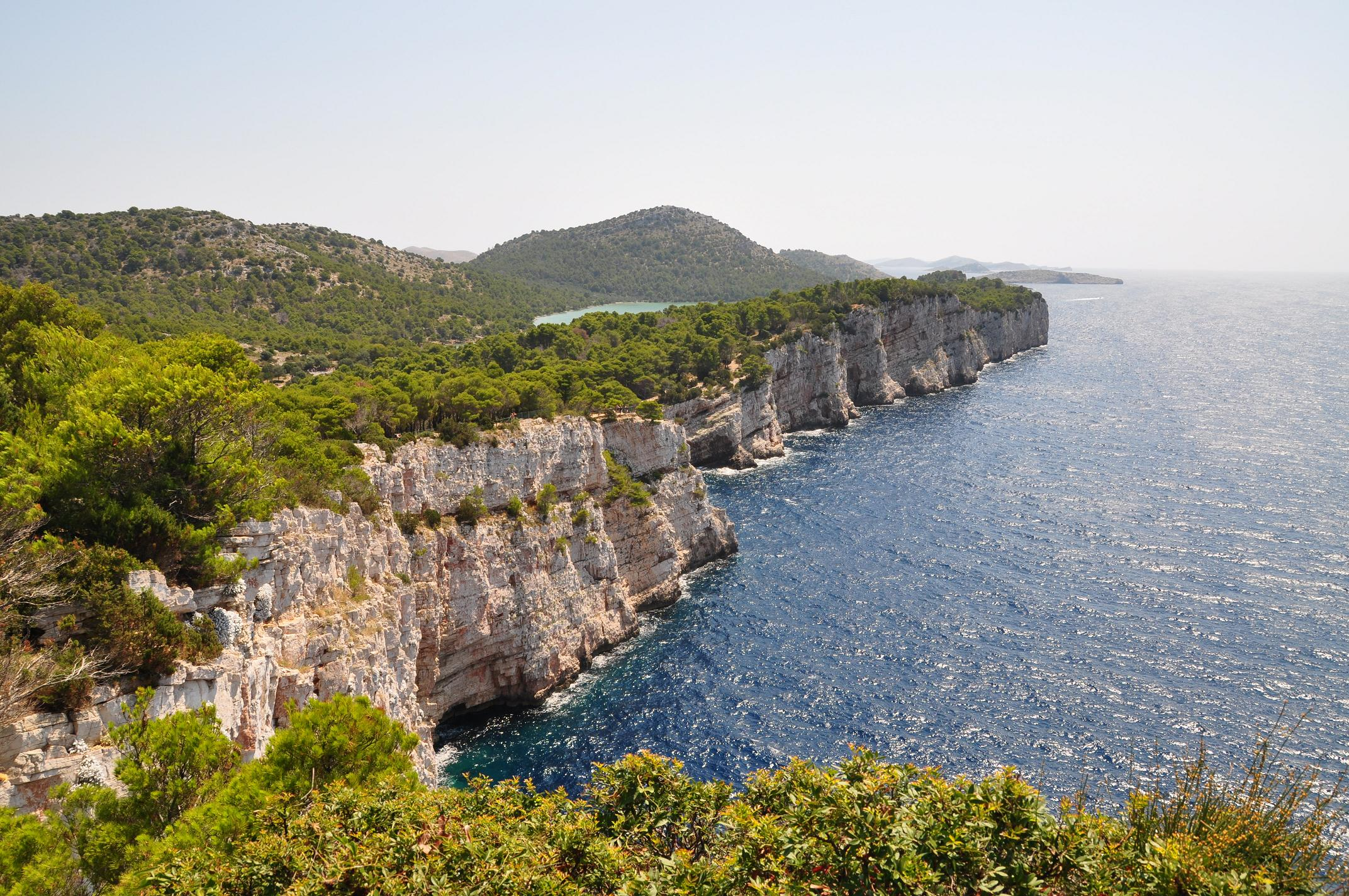
- Telašćica cliff
- Interactive map of Telašćica
- Type: Public
- Area: 70.50 square kilometres (27.22 sq mi)
- Status: Open year round

IUCN Category II (National Park)
- Official name: Nature Park Telašćica
- Designated: 1988
- Reference no.: 14/88

Telašćica (pronounced [telaʃt͡ɕit͡sa]) is a bay in the southeastern part of the island of Dugi Otok, Croatia, in the Adriatic Sea. It is a designated nature park, full of wildlife and marine creatures.

== Geography ==
Telašćica is a 10 km long, 160–1800 m wide, deep inlet dotted with cliffs, islets and bays. The cliffs of Dugi Otok, called the stene locally, rise to 161 m above sea level and drop down to a depth of 90 m. Telašćica bay, which actually consists of three smaller bays, is a good, safe harbour for all kinds of vessels. The northeastern side of the bay is completely bare, but the southwestern shore is covered in thick forest of pine, olive and fig trees. There are six islets and rocks in the bay: Korotan, Galijola, Gozdenjak, Farfarikulac, Gornji Školj and Donji Školj. Lake Mir is a saltwater lake on a narrow strip of land between Telašćica bay and the open sea. The lake is salty due to underground connections to the sea.

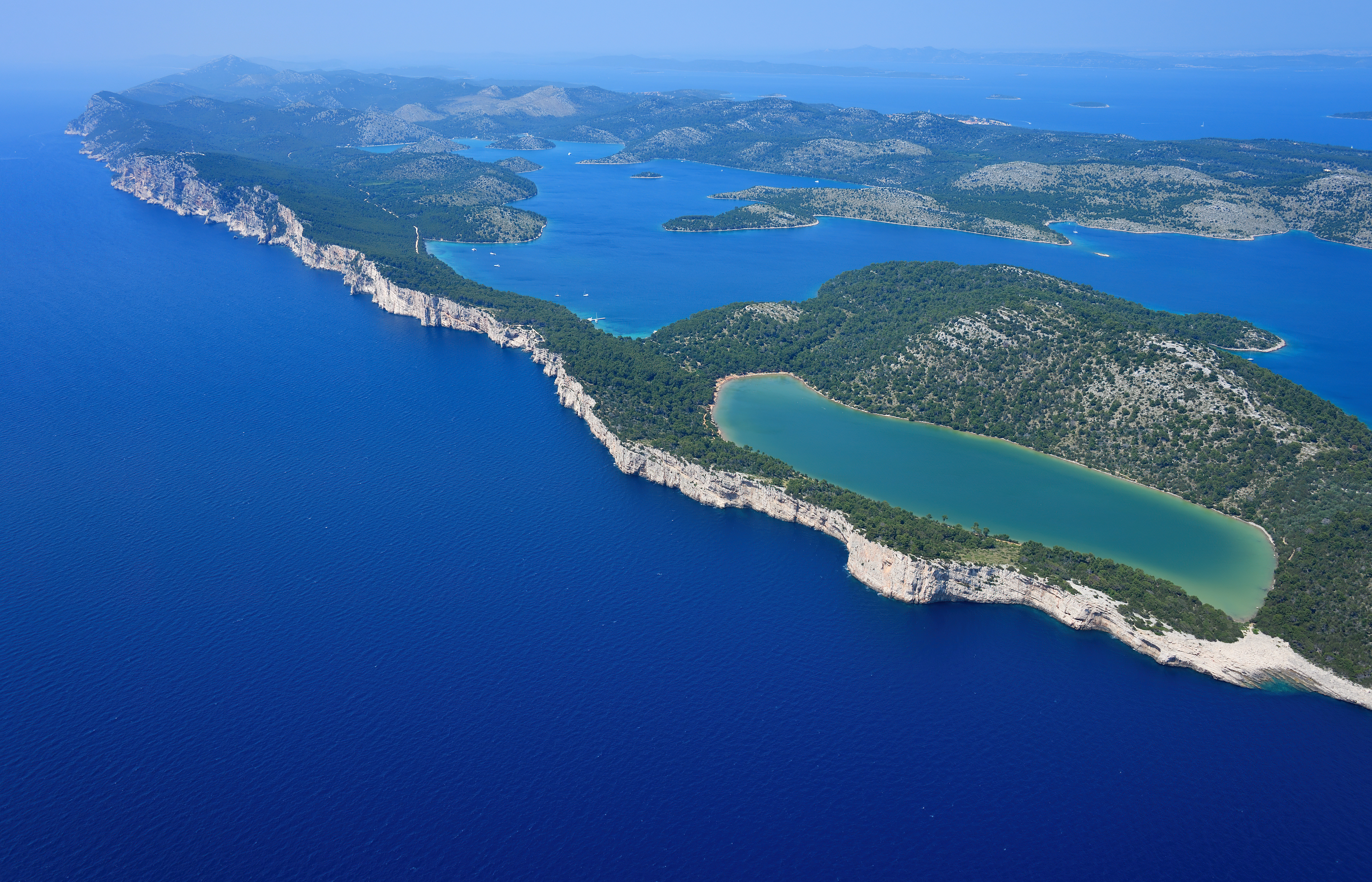
Aerial view

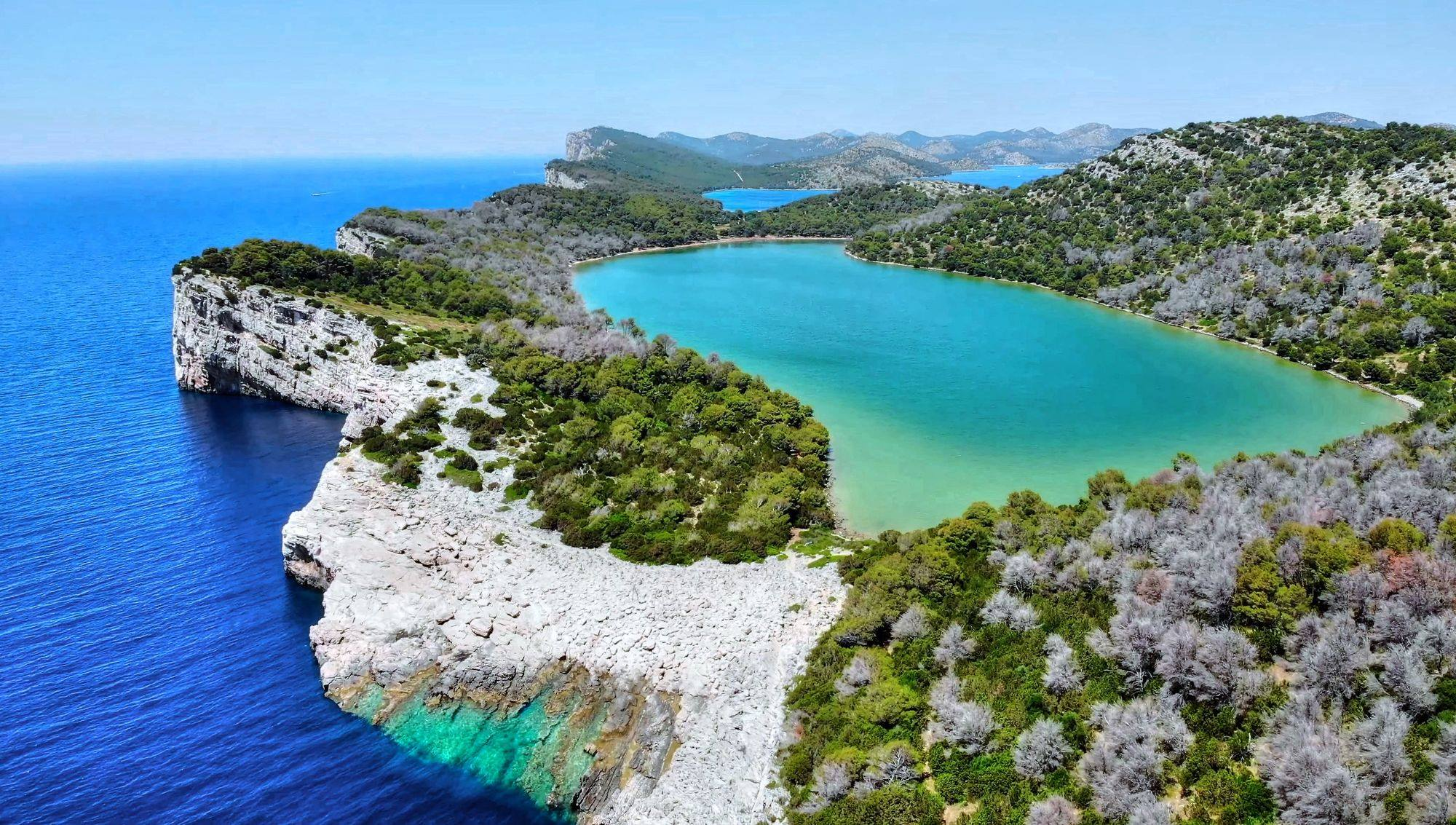
Cliffs in Telašćica

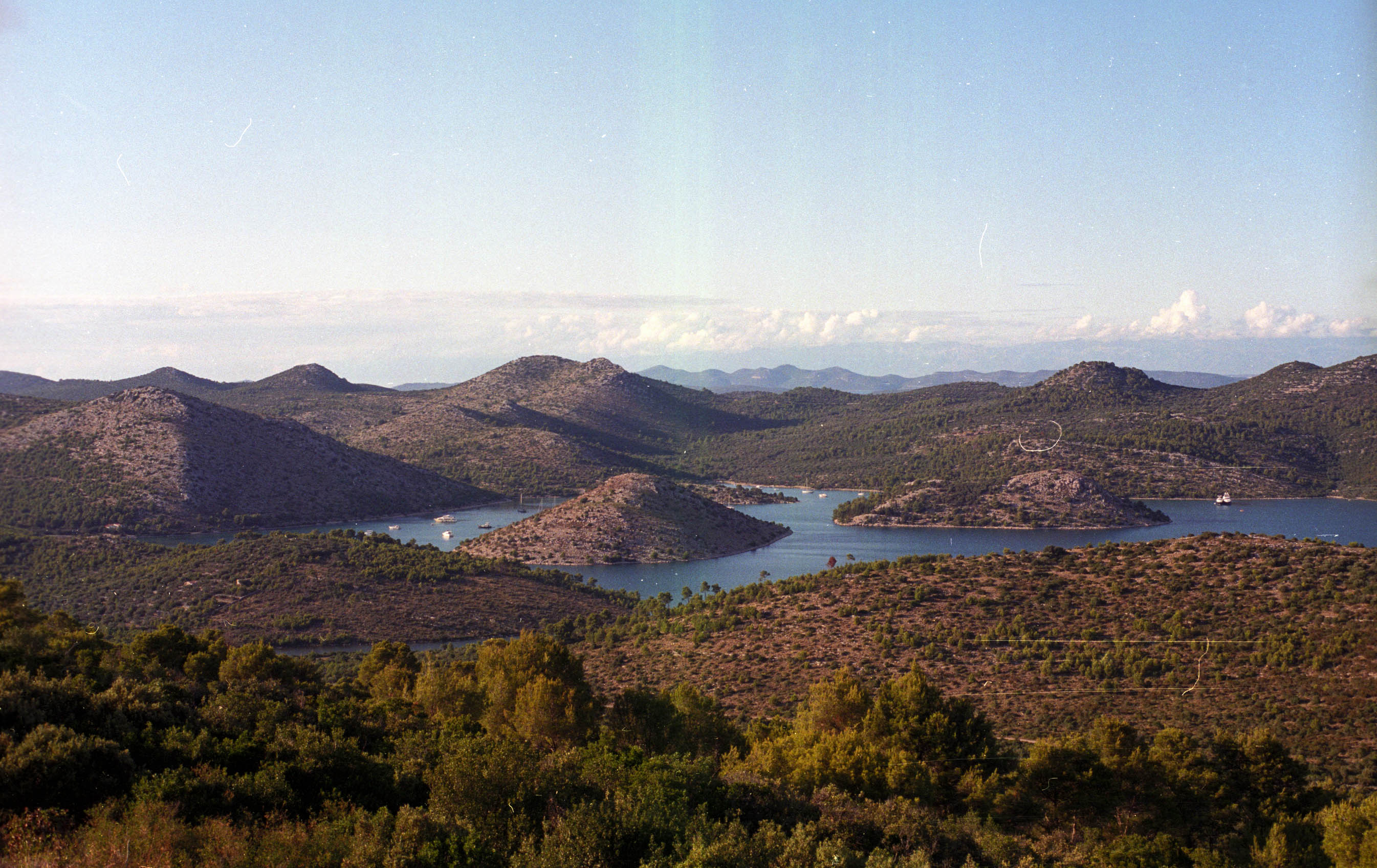
Telašćica bay

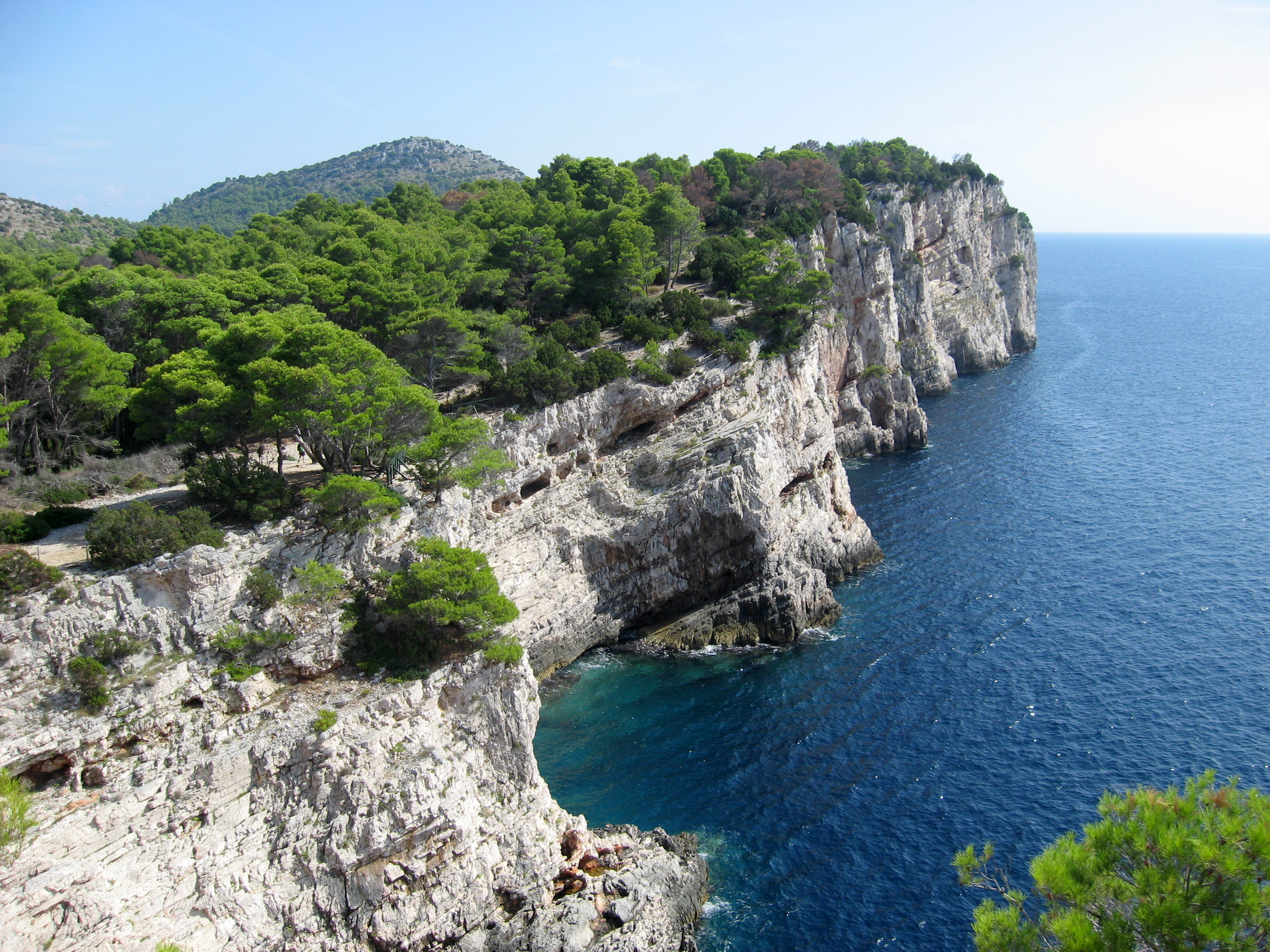
Cliffs in Telašćica

== See also ==
- Protected areas of Croatia
- Tentative list of World Heritage Sites in Croatia
