= Zaglav =

Coordinates: 43°55′01″N 15°22′01″E

- Village
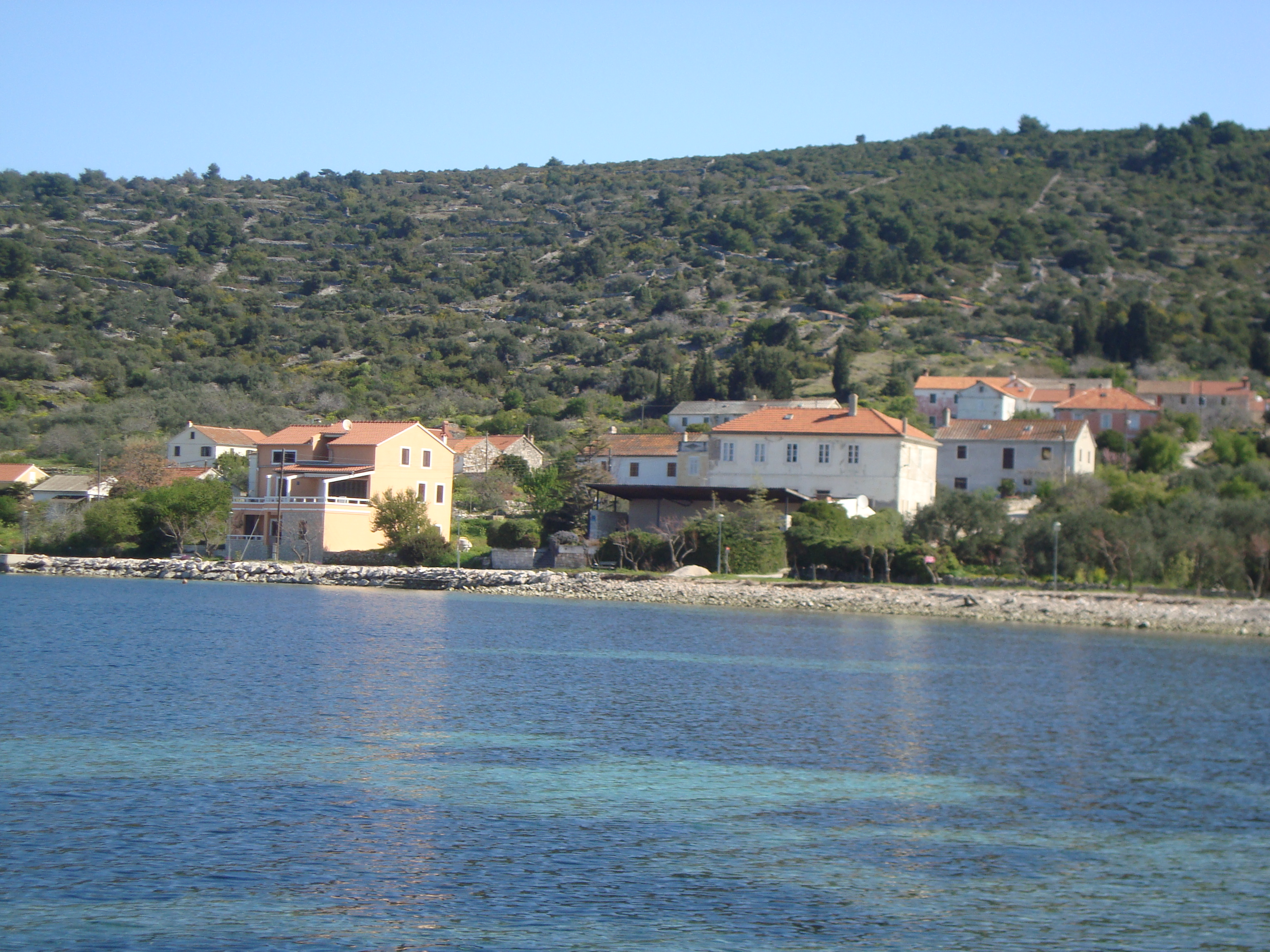
- Country: Croatia

Area
  - Total: 1.7 sq mi (4.4 km^{2})

Population (2021)
  - Total: 171
  - Density: 100/sq mi (39/km^{2})
- Time zone: UTC+1 (CET)
  - Summer (DST): UTC+2 (CEST)

Zaglav is a port village in Croatia. It is connected to the mainland by the D125 highway and by ferry.
