= Brbinj =

Coordinates: 44°04′28″N 15°00′00″E

- Village
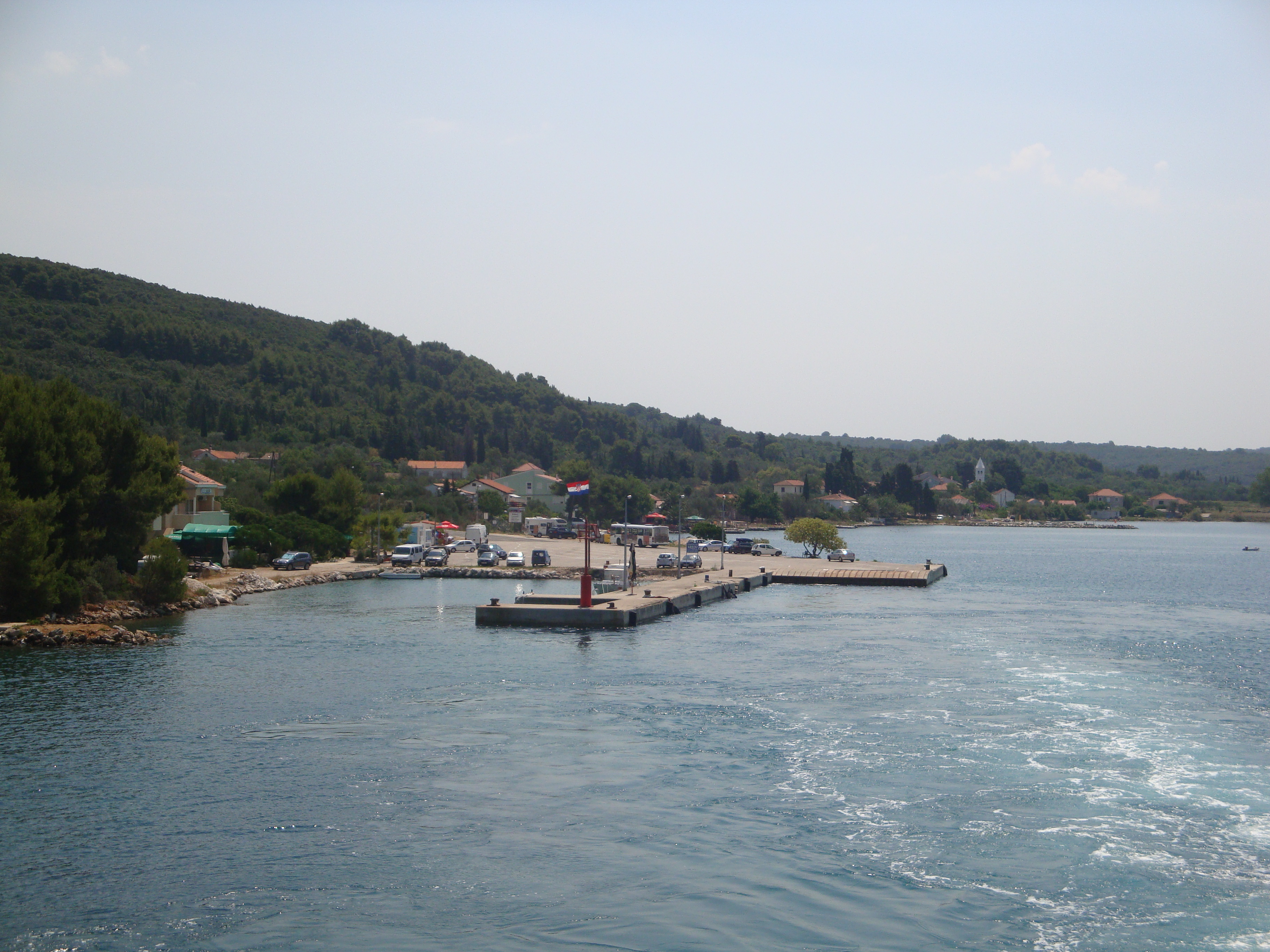
- View of Brbinj

- Location within Croatia
- Country: Croatia
- County: Zadar County

Area
  - Total: 11.0 km^{2} (4.2 sq mi)

Population (2021)
  - Total: 70
  - Density: 6.4/km^{2} (16/sq mi)
- Time zone: UTC+1 (CET)
  - Summer (DST): CEST
- Vehicle registration: ZD

Brbinj is a small village on the northeast coast of the Croatian island of Dugi Otok, between the villages of Dragove and Savar.

Its population is 70 (as of the 2021 census). At the 2011 census, the population was 76.

It embraces two distinct bays, a four-fingered Jaz bay in the south and the Bura bay in the north. The last one became the main ferry port on the island, being connected to Zadar three times per day (Jadrolinija ferries), and thus shifting the village center from Jaz to Bura bay.

A 1608 census recorded 129 inhabitants. A century and a half later, in 1754, Brbinj had 234 inhabitants. A local school, built in 1900, was since closed due to depopulation. Electricity was introduced in the village in 1964. As of early 21st century, agriculture and fishing - traditional means of subsistence for the local population - are limited in scope, and animal farming, common only decades ago, is rare.

The village counts three restaurants, two shops, a post office, a school and a small shipwork. Most of the inhabitants are older people. Tourist attractions include the ruins of Soppe castle, a 16th-century summer house owned by Zadar noblemen, with castle's 17th century chapel, and the main village church, Sv. Kuzma i Damjan built in the 14th century.

== Bibliography ==
- Kaleb, Maja (2014). "Brbinj kroz prošlost" (PDF). Essehist (in Croatian). 6 (6). Faculty of Philosophy, University of Osijek: 62–66.
- Modrić, Oliver (2025-01-27). "Prijenos i zbrinjavanje gradiva župnih arhiva u Arhiv Zadarske nadbiskupije" [Transfer and storage of materials of the parish archives to the Archives of the Archdiocese of Zadar]. Vjesnik dalmatinskih arhiva (in Serbo-Croatian). 5: 109–124. doi:10.58565/vda.5.1.5. eISSN 2806-8459.
