= Dugi Otok =

Long island in the Adriatic sea, part of Croatia

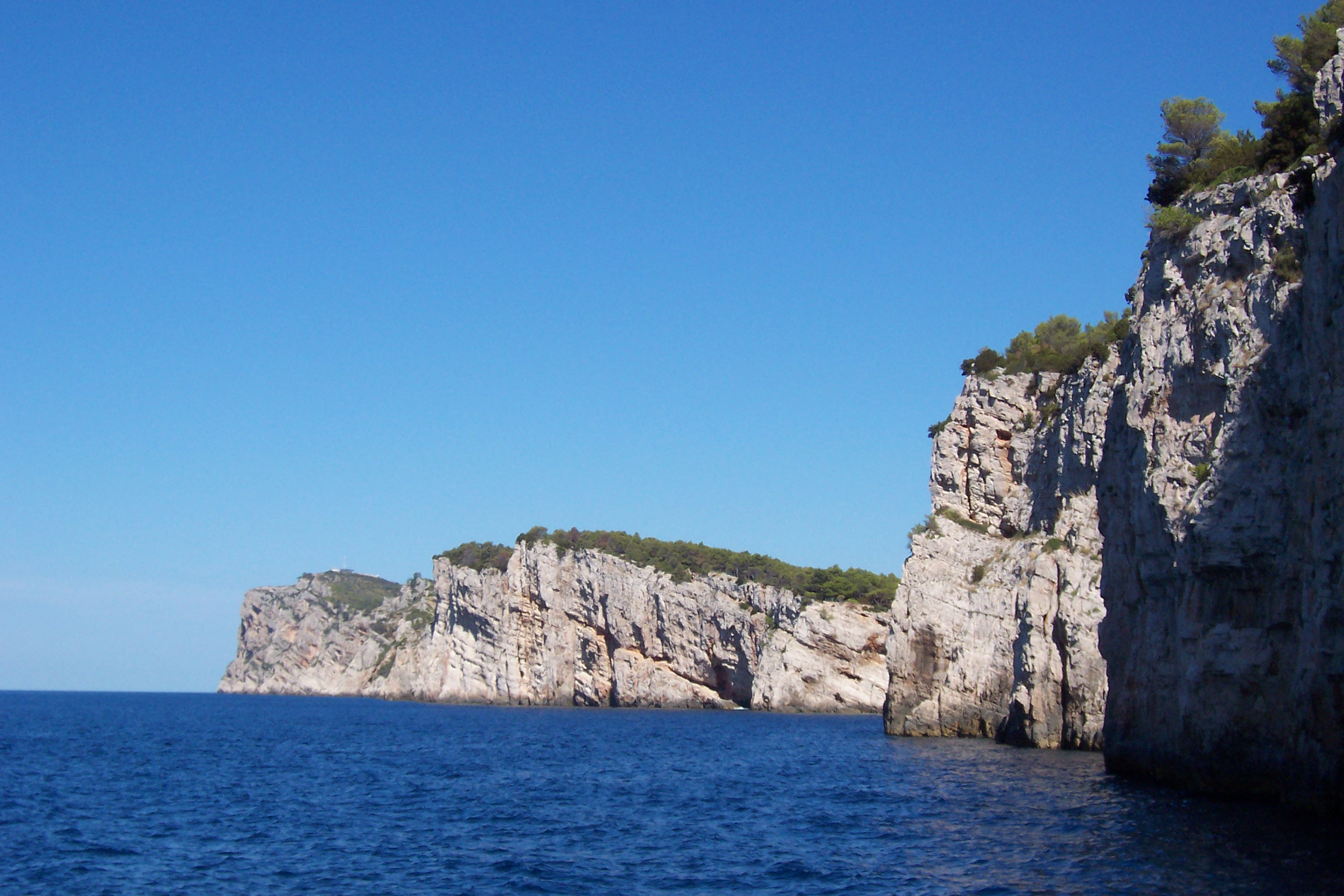
- Western shore of Dugi otok
- Interactive map of Dugi Otok

Geography
- Location: Adriatic Sea
- Coordinates: 44°01′N 15°01′E
- Area: 114.44 km^{2} (44.19 sq mi)
- Highest elevation: 337 m (1106 ft)

Administration
- Croatia
- County: Zadar County
- Largest settlement: Sali (pop. 740)

Demographics
- Population: 1,655 (2011)
- Pop. density: 14.46/km^{2} (37.45/sq mi)

Dugi Otok (pronounced [dûɡiː ǒtok]; Croatian for "Long Island"; Italian and Venetian: Isola Lunga) is part of Croatia and the seventh largest island in the Adriatic Sea. It is located off the Dalmatian coast, west of Zadar. It is the largest and westernmost of the Zadarian Islands, and derives its name from its distinctive shape: it is 44.5 km (27.7 miles) long by 4.8 km (3.0 miles) wide, with an area of 114 square kilometres (44 sq mi). Its elevation reaches 300 m; and many of its higher portions contain stands of Maritime Pine.

The western coast is tall and rugged, and many of the towns are clustered on the eastern side, including Sali, the largest, Zaglav, Žman, Luka, Savar, Brbinj, Dragove, Božava, Soline, Verunić (Verona) and Veli Rat. A nature park, Telašćica, covers the southern part of the island and is adjacent to Kornati Islands National Park. There are six islets and rocks in the Telašćica Bay: Korotan, Galijola, Gozdenjak, Farfarikulac, Gornji Školj and Donji Školj.

== Population ==
=== Population Movement History ===
Changes in population on Dugi Otok from 1608 until 1840, by place
Place	1608	1759	1818	1840
Božava	83	122	186	139
Brbinj	129	256	284	210
Dragove	71	186	195	211
Luka	212	182	173	159
Sali	455	437	490	506
Savar	124	135	195	161
Soline	0	117	150	149
Veli Rat	105	161	171	189
Zaglav	46	98	101	-
Žman	338	284	212	180
TOTAL	1563	1978	2146	2023

Changes in population on Dugi Otok from 1857 to 1948, by place
place	1857	1869	1880	1890	1900	1910	1921	1931	1948	
Božava	180	-	195	239	277	261	335	248	260	44.4
Brbinj	202	233	230	238	309	333	328	327	328	62.4
Dragove	219	500	221	285	352	323	392	333	381	73.8
Luka	162	181	212	257	365	384	406	350	375	131.5
Sali	449	644	586	713	830	880	1117	1097	1230	173.9
Savar	151	167	178	177	202	242	284	298	286	89.4
Soline	225	-	249	297	304	329	329	329	384	70.7
Veli Rat	263	533	230	320	315	337	452	300	286	-
Zaglav	112	-	142	177	222	222	286	254	408	264.3
Žman	210	276	308	412	493	499	653	572	633	201.4
TOTAL	2173	2534	2628	3164	3730	3858	4582	4211	4670	114.9
Base Index	100.0	116.6	120.9	145.6	171.6	177.5	210.9	193.8	214.9	-

== History ==
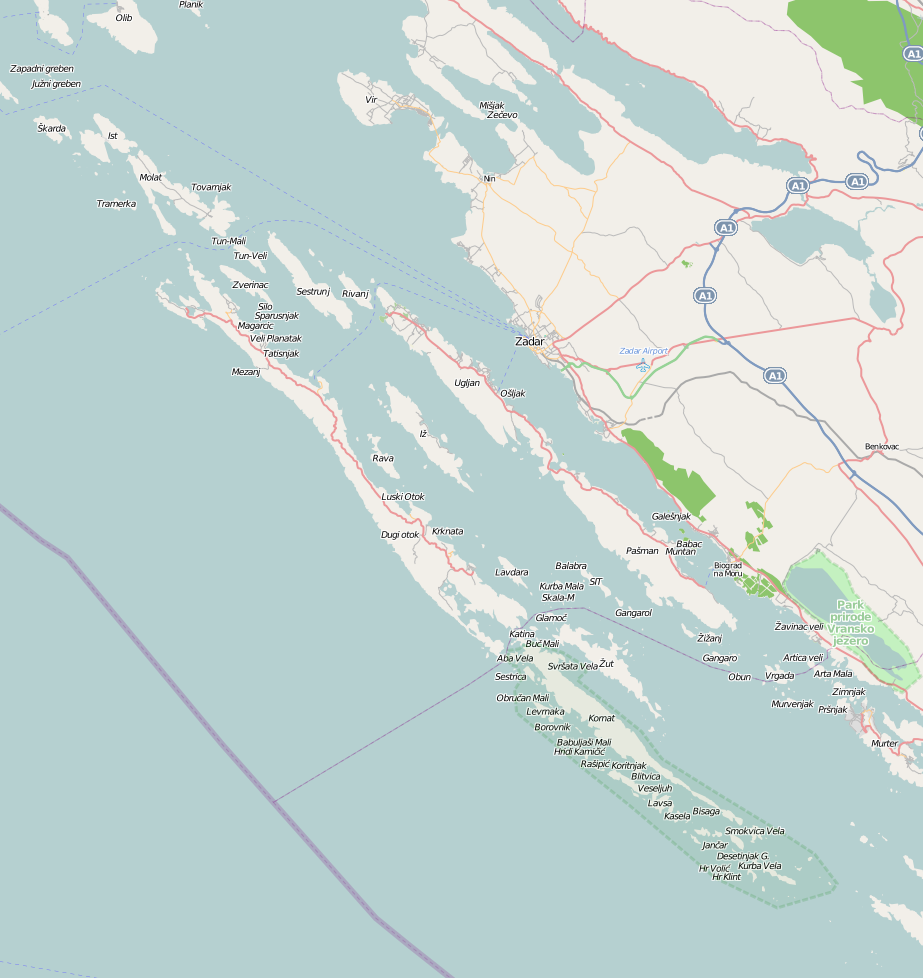
Map. The longest island is Dugi Otok

The island has been inhabited since prehistoric times, as evidenced by many archeological sites that have still not been fully investigated. The earliest findings date back to Paleolithic, and numerous hillforts and grave sites are evidence of continuous settlement throughout Eneolithic, Bronze Age and Iron Age.

The Byzantine Emperor Constantine VII in the 10th century mentioned it under the name of Pizuh in his work "De administrando imperio", and later it was called Insula Tilagus in documents ("pelagos" in Greek means sea), and its Latin name was Insula maior. In the 15th century it was registered as Veli otok.

The old and main settlement on the island was located in the southern area. It has only been inhabited significantly since the Turkish invasions (15th–16th centuries). Until then the island belonged to Zadar monasteries and citizens. Nowadays there are a total of 11 settlements on the island, and they are all on the north-eastern side of the island concerned primarily with fishing, although salt was once produced there.

The village of Veli Rat is also home to the Veli Rat lighthouse, another spectacular sight. The beautiful island of Dugi Otok, with a Mediterranean climate and ancient Croatian culture, receives very few visitors. Olive oil, figs, cheese and wine accompany the seafood in the natives' diet. A definite step back in time, the island boasts an ancient church and some Roman ruins. It is in close proximity to Kornati.

== Description ==
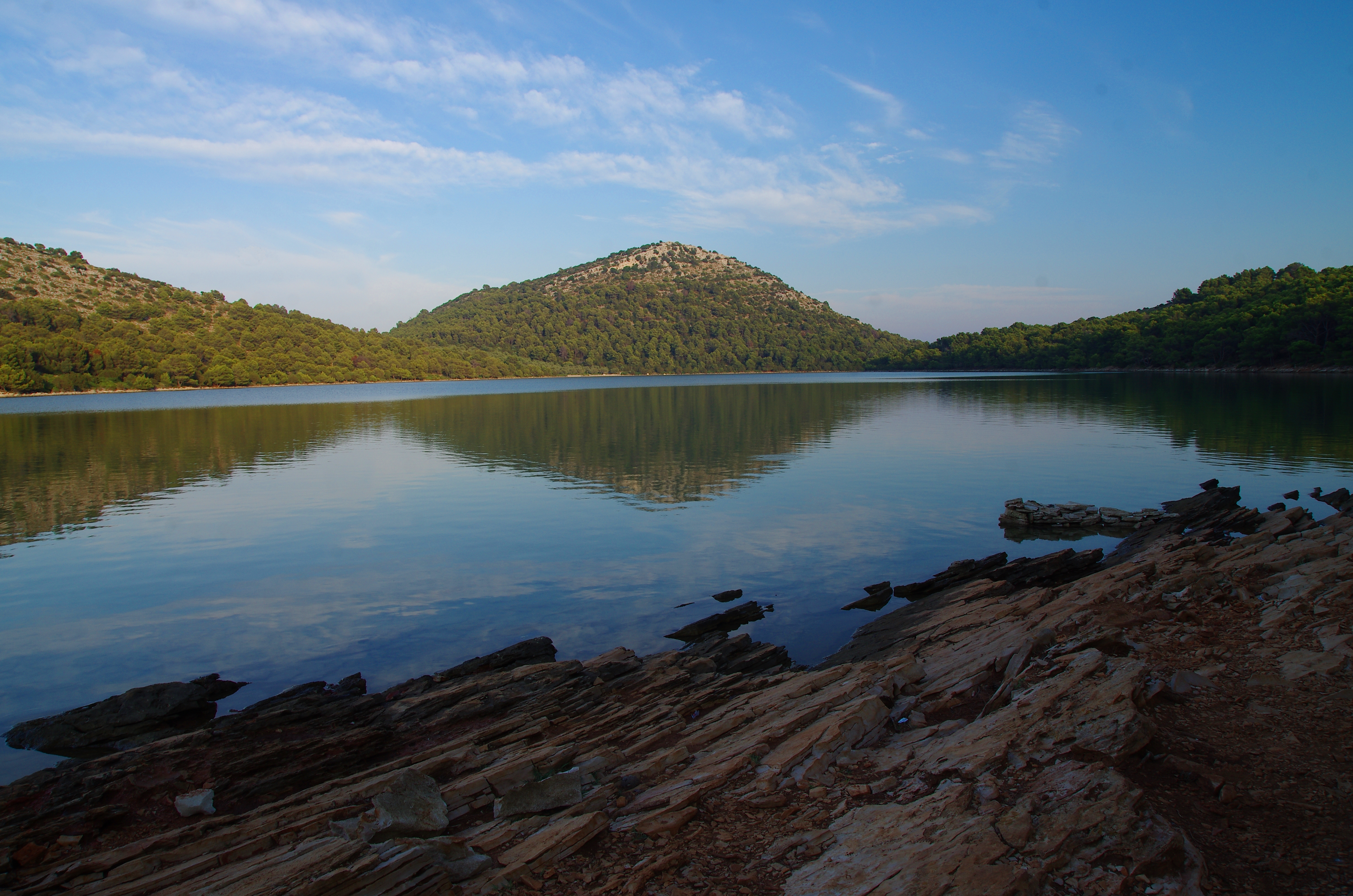
The salt lake

More than 1500 hectares are covered with vineyards, orchards and arable land, about 752 hectares are pasture land and about 300 hectares undergrowth which in some places is used as a forest land. The vegetation is more pronounced in the northern and central areas of the island. The south-eastern part belong to the Kornati.

The road from Telašćica to Veli Rat, along the length of the island, connects all the settlements.

== Gallery ==
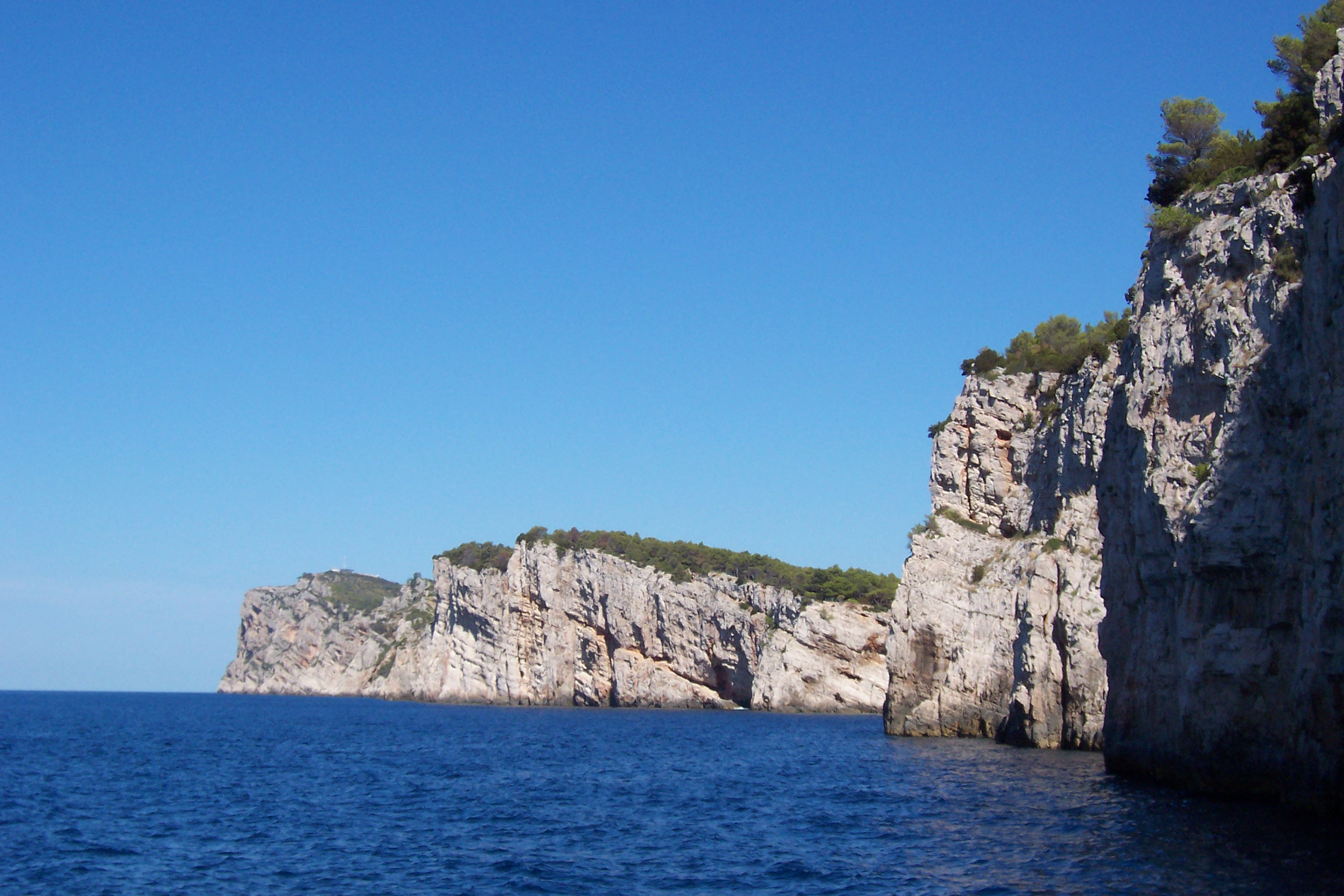
Coast

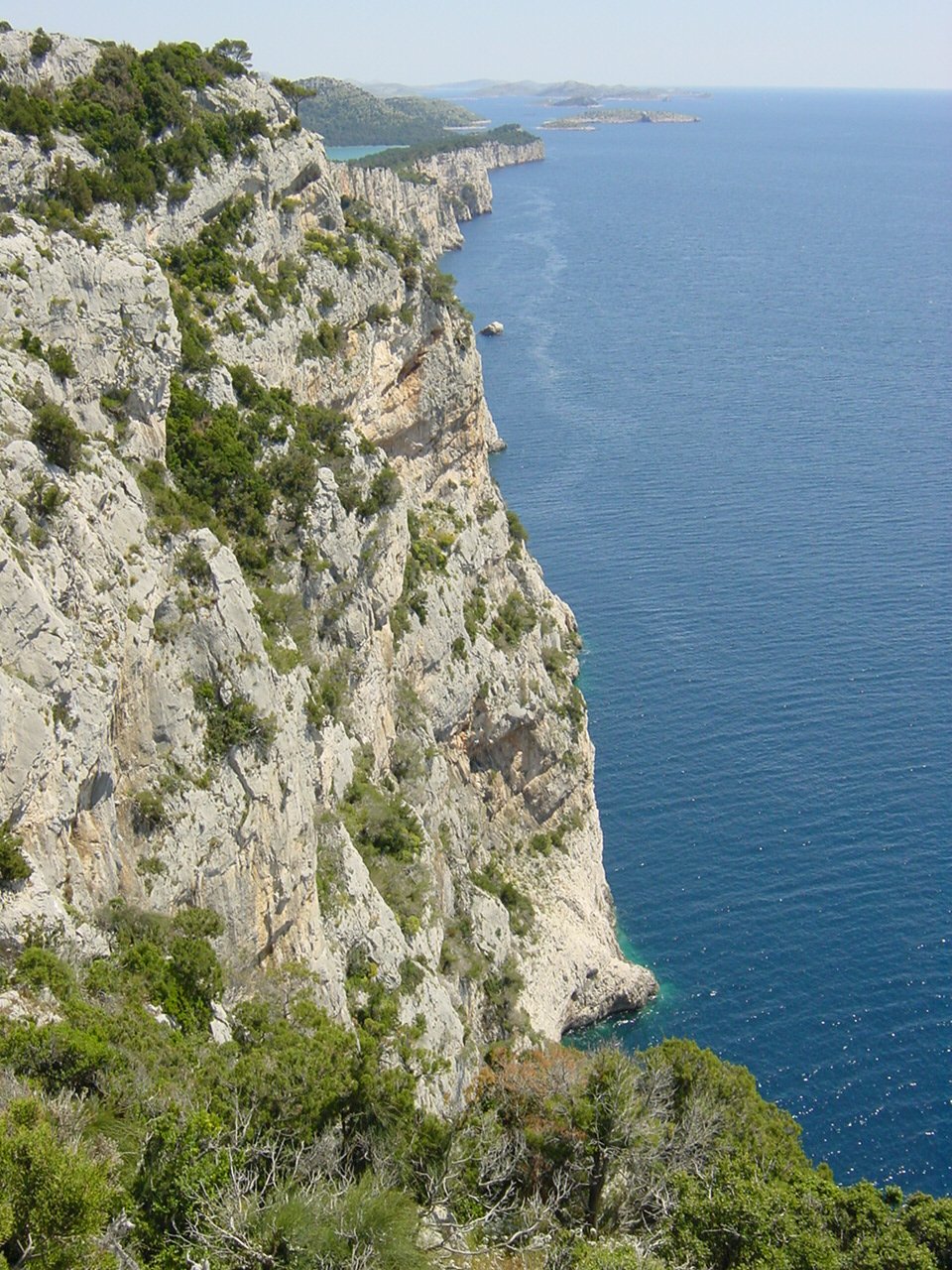
Rocks of Dugi Otok

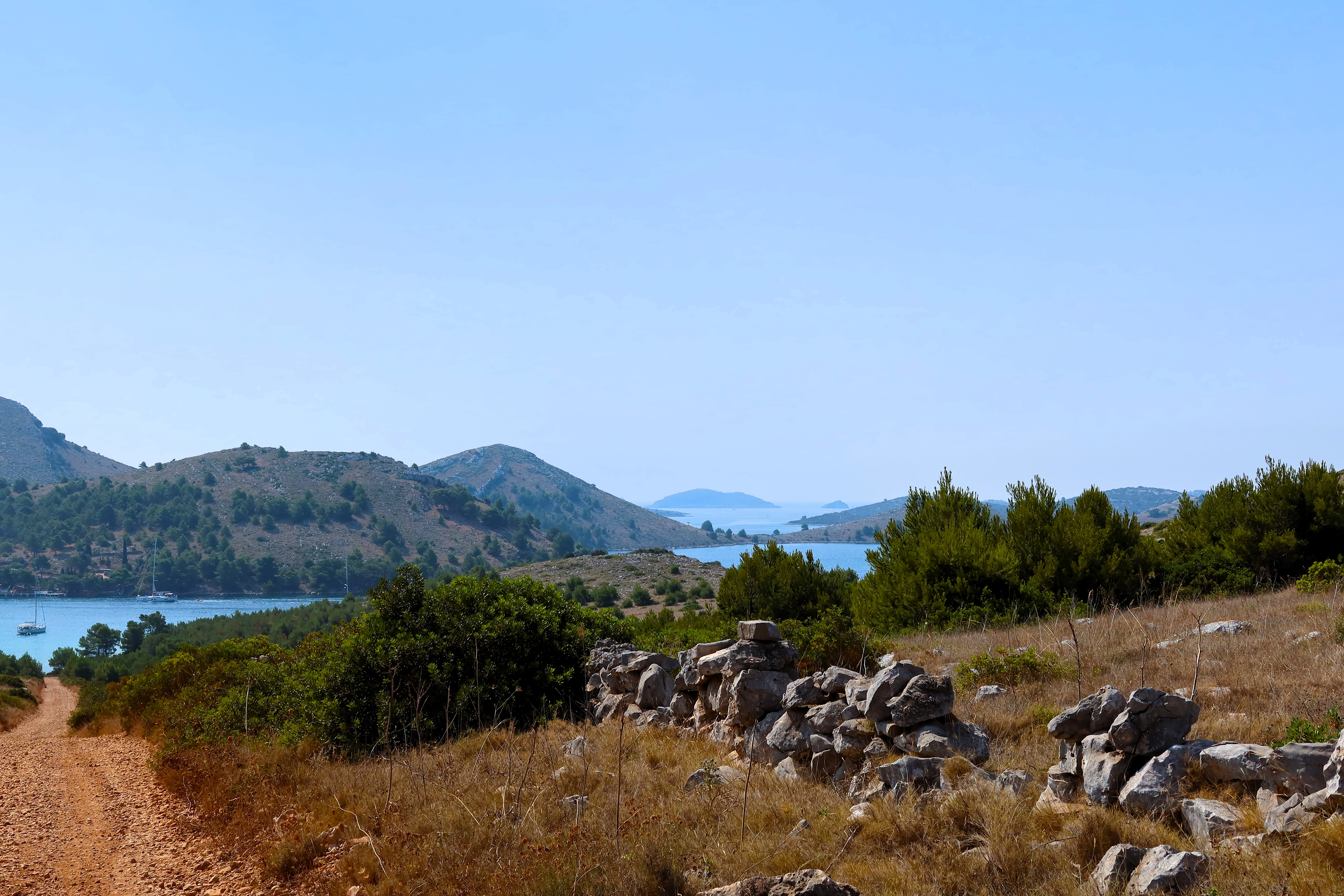
Mala Proversa and the Kornati islands

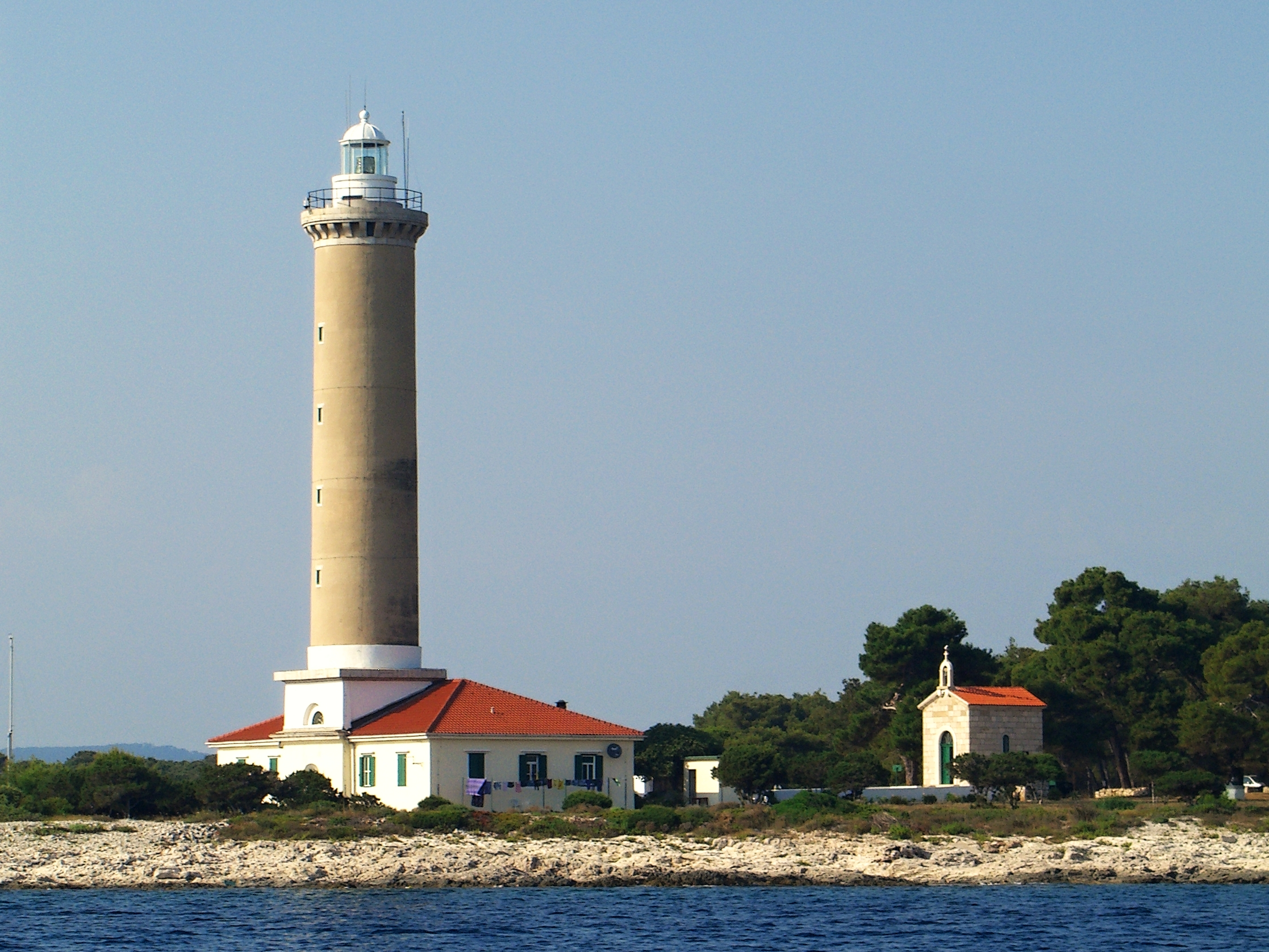
Veli Rat lighthouse

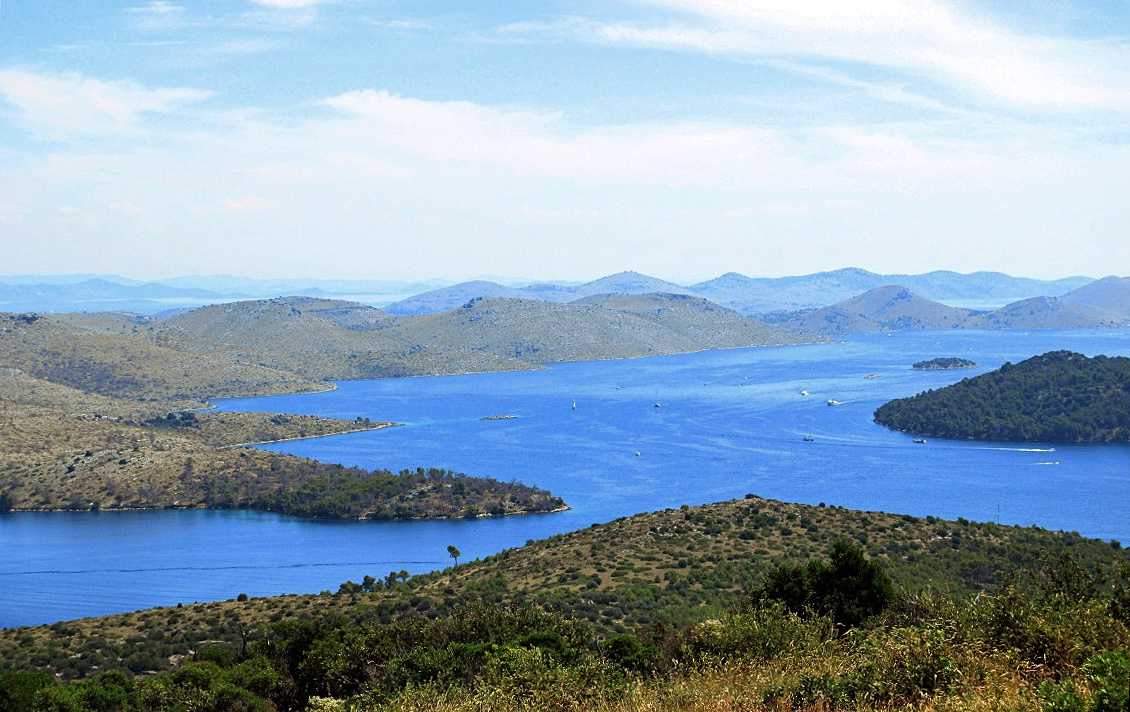
Telašćica Bay

== See also ==
- Šibenik

== Sources ==
- "Prostorni plan Zadarske županije" (PDF) (in Croatian). Physical Planning Institute of Zadar County. December 2006.
- Čuka, Anica (June 2006). "Utjecaj litoralizacije na demogeografski razvoj Dugog otoka" [The influence of littoralization on demographic development of Dugi Otok island] (PDF). Geoadria (in Croatian and English). 11 (1): 63–92. doi:10.15291/geoadria.104.
- Džaja, Katarina (December 2003). "Geomorfološke značajke Dugog otoka" [Geomorphological Characteristics of Dugi Otok Island, Croatia] (PDF). Geoadria (in Croatian). 8 (2): 5–44. doi:10.15291/geoadria.98.
