= List of islands of Croatia =

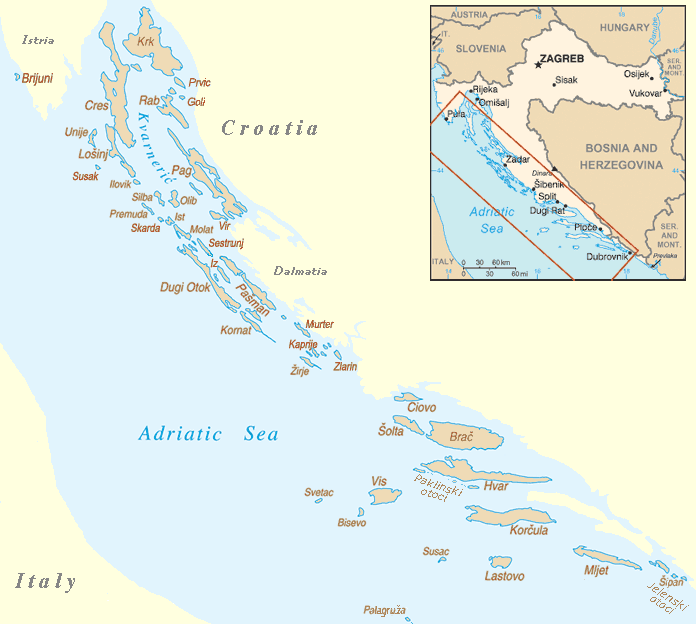
Map of the Croatian islands

This is a list of islands of Croatia. There are over a thousand islands in Croatia, the exact number varying by definitions, and they cover a total area of about 3,300 km^{2} (1,300 sq mi). The number and classification of islands in Croatia varies over time and by different measurements, causing some domestic controversy when discrepancies are found.

== Largest islands ==
These are the larger ones, sorted approximately from northwest to southeast:

=== Northern seacoast ===
- the Brijuni islands, also a national park
- Krk, the largest population, the largest area along with Cres
- Plavnik
- Cres, the largest area along with Krk
- Lošinj
- Ilovik
- Unije
- Susak
- Prvić
- Goli Otok
- Sveti Grgur
- Rab
- Pag
- Olib
- Silba
- Premuda
- Ist
- Molat
- Košljun

=== Northern Dalmatia ===
- Vir
- Dugi Otok
- Ugljan
- Iž
- Pašman
- the Kornati archipelago, also a national park
- Krapanj
- Murter
- Sestrunj
- Škarda
- Zlarin

=== Central and southern Dalmatia ===
- Čiovo
- Drvenik
- Šolta
- Brač
- Hvar
- Vis
- Biševo
- Brusnik
- Jabuka
- Svetac
- Korčula
- Lastovo
- Mljet
- the Elaphiti Islands: Koločep (southernmost inhabited island), Lopud, Šipan
- Lokrum
- Palagruža (southernmost island)
- Žirje
- Žut

== Hydrographic Institute definitions ==
The Hydrographic Institute of the Republic of Croatia classifies all landforms surrounded by water in the Adriatic Sea as islands (Croatian: otoci), islets (otočići) and rocks (hridi). The categorization is determined according to their surface area. Rocks are defined as islets smaller than 0.1 km^{2} (0.04 sq mi), islets are between 0.1 and 1.0 km^{2} (0.04 and 0.39 sq mi) and islands proper are bigger than 1.0 km^{2} (0.39 sq mi).

#	Number	Area		Percentage of total area	Coastline length		Percentage of total coastline
#	Number	km^{2}	sq mi	Percentage of total area	km	mi	Percentage of total coastline
Islands	79	3,195.71	1,233.87	98.04%	3,573.81	2,220.66	81.25%
Islets	525	62.41	24.10	1.91%	717.80	446.02	16.32%
Rocks and rocks awash	642	1.44	0.56	0.04%	106.82	66.37	2.43%
Total	1246	3,259.57	1,258.53	100.00%	4,398.44	2,733.06	100.00%
Source: T. Duplančić Leder, T. Ujević, M. Čala: Coastline lengths and areas... Geoadria, 9/1, 5-32, 2004.

According to measurements obtained in early 2000s the largest islands in the Adriatic Sea are Cres with an area of 405.70 km^{2} (156.64 sq mi), and Krk with an area of 405.22 km^{2} (156.46 sq mi) (In earlier literature, including atlases, Krk was usually cited as the largest island). The smallest island is Smokvica Vela (Kornati) with an area of 1.04 km^{2} (0.40 sq mi). The island with the longest coastline of 302.47 km (187.95 mi) is Pag, being the fifth according to area value and the island with the shortest coastline length of 5.8 km (3.60 mi) is Vele Orjule. The biggest islet is Badija with an area of 0.97 km^{2} (0.37 sq mi), while the smallest one is Galicija covering 0.01 km^{2} (0.0039 sq mi).

=== List of islands ===
The following table lists the 79 Croatian islands having an area of 1 km^{2} (0.39 sq mi) or more, sorted by their surface area from largest to smallest. The area data is rounded off to the second decimal.

#	Island	Area		Population	County	Coordinates
#	Island	km^{2}	sq mi	Population	County	Coordinates
1	Cres	405.70	156.64	3,184	Primorje-Gorski Kotar	44°52′07″N 14°25′22″E
2	Krk	405.22	156.46	17,860	Primorje-Gorski Kotar	45°04′27″N 14°36′28″E
3	Brač	395.44	152.68	14,031	Split-Dalmatia	43°19′26″N 16°38′33″E
4	Hvar	297.38	114.82	11,103	Split-Dalmatia	43°08′39″N 16°46′46″E
5	Pag	284.18	109.72	8,398	Lika-Senj / Zadar	44°28′59″N 14°58′00″E
6	Korčula	271.47	104.82	16,182	Dubrovnik-Neretva	42°56′20″N 16°54′11″E
7	Dugi Otok	113.30	43.75	1,772	Zadar	44°00′40″N 15°02′15″E
8	Mljet	98.02	37.85	1,111	Dubrovnik-Neretva	42°44′52″N 17°31′52″E
9	Vis	89.72	34.64	3,617	Split-Dalmatia	43°02′41″N 16°09′15″E
10	Rab	86.16	33.27	9,480	Primorje-Gorski Kotar	44°46′14″N 14°46′32″E
11	Pašman	60.11	23.21	2,711	Zadar	43°57′05″N 15°21′03″E
12	Šolta	58.18	22.46	1,479	Split-Dalmatia	43°22′46″N 16°17′51″E
13	Lošinj	74	29	7,771	Primorje-Gorski Kotar	
14	Ugljan	51.05	19.71	6,182	Zadar	44°05′03″N 15°09′34″E
15	Lastovo	40.82	15.76	835	Dubrovnik-Neretva	42°45′15″N 16°52′31″E
16	Kornat	32.44	12.53	7	Šibenik-Knin	43°48′33″N 15°19′09″E
17	Čiovo	28.13	10.86	4,455	Split-Dalmatia	43°30′01″N 16°17′53″E
18	Olib	26.14	10.09	147	Zadar	44°22′41″N 14°47′08″E
19	Molat	22.18	8.56	207	Zadar	44°13′55″N 14°50′33″E
20	Vir	22.08	8.53	1,608	Zadar	44°18′16″N 15°03′59″E
22	Murter	17.58	6.79	5,060	Šibenik-Knin	43°48′04″N 15°36′46″E
23	Unije	16.88	6.52	90	Primorje-Gorski Kotar	44°38′56″N 14°15′25″E
24	Iž	16.51	6.37	557	Zadar	44°02′20″N 15°06′53″E
25	Šipan	16.22	6.26	476	Dubrovnik-Neretva	42°43′42″N 17°52′44″E
26	Sestrunj	15.12	5.84	48	Zadar	44°09′22″N 14°59′27″E
27	Žirje	15.08	5.82	124	Šibenik-Knin	43°39′05″N 15°39′41″E
28	Žut	14.83	5.73	0	Šibenik-Knin	43°51′47″N 15°18′51″E
29	Silba	14.27	5.51	265	Zadar	44°22′56″N 14°41′41″E
30	Prvić (Krk)	12.76	4.93	0	Primorje-Gorski Kotar	44°54′38″N 14°48′05″E
31	Drvenik Veli	11.70	4.52	168	Split-Dalmatia	43°26′39″N 16°08′43″E
32	Ist	9.73	3.76	202	Zadar	44°16′28″N 14°45′51″E
33	Premuda	8.67	3.35	58	Zadar	44°19′44″N 14°37′31″E
34	Plavnik	8.64	3.34	0	Primorje-Gorski Kotar	44°58′17″N 14°31′30″E
35	Maun	8.50	3.28	0	Zadar	44°25′42″N 14°55′21″E
36	Šćedro	8.37	3.23	0	Split-Dalmatia	43°05′18″N 16°42′07″E
37	Zlarin	8.05	3.11	276	Šibenik-Knin	43°41′19″N 15°50′56″E
38	Kaprije	7.12	2.75	143	Šibenik-Knin	43°41′51″N 15°42′01″E
39	Sveti Grgur	6.38	2.46	0	Primorje-Gorski Kotar	44°52′02″N 14°45′35″E
40	Biševo	5.92	2.29	19	Split-Dalmatia	42°58′27″N 16°00′39″E
41	Veli Brijun	5.72	2.21	0	Istria	
42	Ilovik	5.50	2.12	104	Primorje-Gorski Kotar	
43	Sveti Klement	5.28	2.04	0	Split-Dalmatia	
44	Dolin	4.61	1.78	0	Primorje-Gorski Kotar	
45	Goli Otok	4.54	1.75	0	Primorje-Gorski Kotar	
46	Lopud	4.38	1.69	278	Dubrovnik-Neretva	
47	Svetac	4.19	1.62	0	Split-Dalmatia	
48	Zverinac	4.18	1.61	48	Zadar	
49	Sušac	4.03	1.56	0	Dubrovnik-Neretva	
50	Škarda	3.78	1.46	0	Zadar	
51	Susak	3.77	1.46	188	Primorje-Gorski Kotar	
52	Rava	3.63	1.40	98	Zadar	
53	Rivanj	3.62	1.40	22	Zadar	
54	Drvenik Mali	3.43	1.32	54	Split-Dalmatia	
55	Kakan	3.39	1.31	0	Šibenik-Knin	
56	Zmajan	3.30	1.27	0	Šibenik-Knin	
57	Jakljan	3.07	1.19	0	Dubrovnik-Neretva	
58	Prežba	2.80	1.08	0	Dubrovnik-Neretva	
59	Tijat	2.78	1.07	0		
60	Piškera	2.67	1.03	0	Zadar	
61	Zeča	2.55	0.98	0		
62	Koločep	2.44	0.94	231	Dubrovnik-Neretva	
63	Prvić (Šibenik)	2.41	0.93	453		
64	Vrgada	2.32	0.90	242		
65	Lavdara	2.27	0.88	0		
66	Tun Veli	2.21	0.85	0		
67	Škrda	2.05	0.79	0		
68	Levrnaka	1.84	0.71	0		
69	Lavsa	1.78	0.69	0		
70	Sit	1.77	0.68	0		
71	Kurba Vela	1.74	0.67	0		
72	Mrčara	1.45	0.56	0	Dubrovnik-Neretva	
73	Arta Velika	1.28	0.49	0	Šibenik-Knin	
74	Vele Srakane	1.18	0.46	4		
75	Katina	1.13	0.44	0		
76	Planik	1.09	0.42	0		
77	Mali Brijun	1.07	0.41	0		
78	Vele Orjule	1.06	0.41	0		
79	Smokvica Vela	1.05	0.41	0		

=== Selected islets ===
The following is an incomplete list of islets.

- Badija
- Brijuni
- Farfarikulac, island in the Telašćica Nature Park
- Galešnjak
- Galijula, southernmost Croatian island.
- Jabuka
- Jaz
- Knežak
- Košljun
- Kozjak
- Krapanj
- Lokrum
- Lunga (Kornat)
- Lupac
- Male Srakane
- Olipa
- Ošljak
- Palagruža
- Pokonji Dol, easternmost island of the Pakleni otoci archipelago
- Radelj
- Ruda
- Sveti Andrija (Dubrovnik), uninhabited island near Dubrovnik
- Sveti Andrija (Rovinj), also known as Crveni otok (English: Red Island), off the coast of Rovinj

== Bureau of Statistics definitions ==
The Croatian Bureau of Statistics uses data from the Geographical Department of the Faculty of Science of the University of Zagreb, which classifies a total of 1,185 islands, rocks and reefs: 48 inhabited islands, 670 uninhabited islands (Croatian: otoci), 389 rocks (hridi) and 78 reefs (grebeni). The rocks and reefs are defined as the "rocky remains of an islet or a rocky formation destroyed by abrasion", differentiated by whether they are "always above sea level" or "at, under or above sea level (at low tide)", respectively.

== Other definitions ==
Mark Biondich's Eastern Europe: An Introduction to the People, Lands, and Culture puts the number of Croatian islands at 1,246. Of these, there are 718 islands in the conventional sense, 389 cliffs, and 78 reefs.

== See also ==
- List of islands in the Adriatic
- List of islands of Europe
- List of inhabited islands of Croatia
