= 2007 Croatian coast fires =

Series of wildfires in Croatia

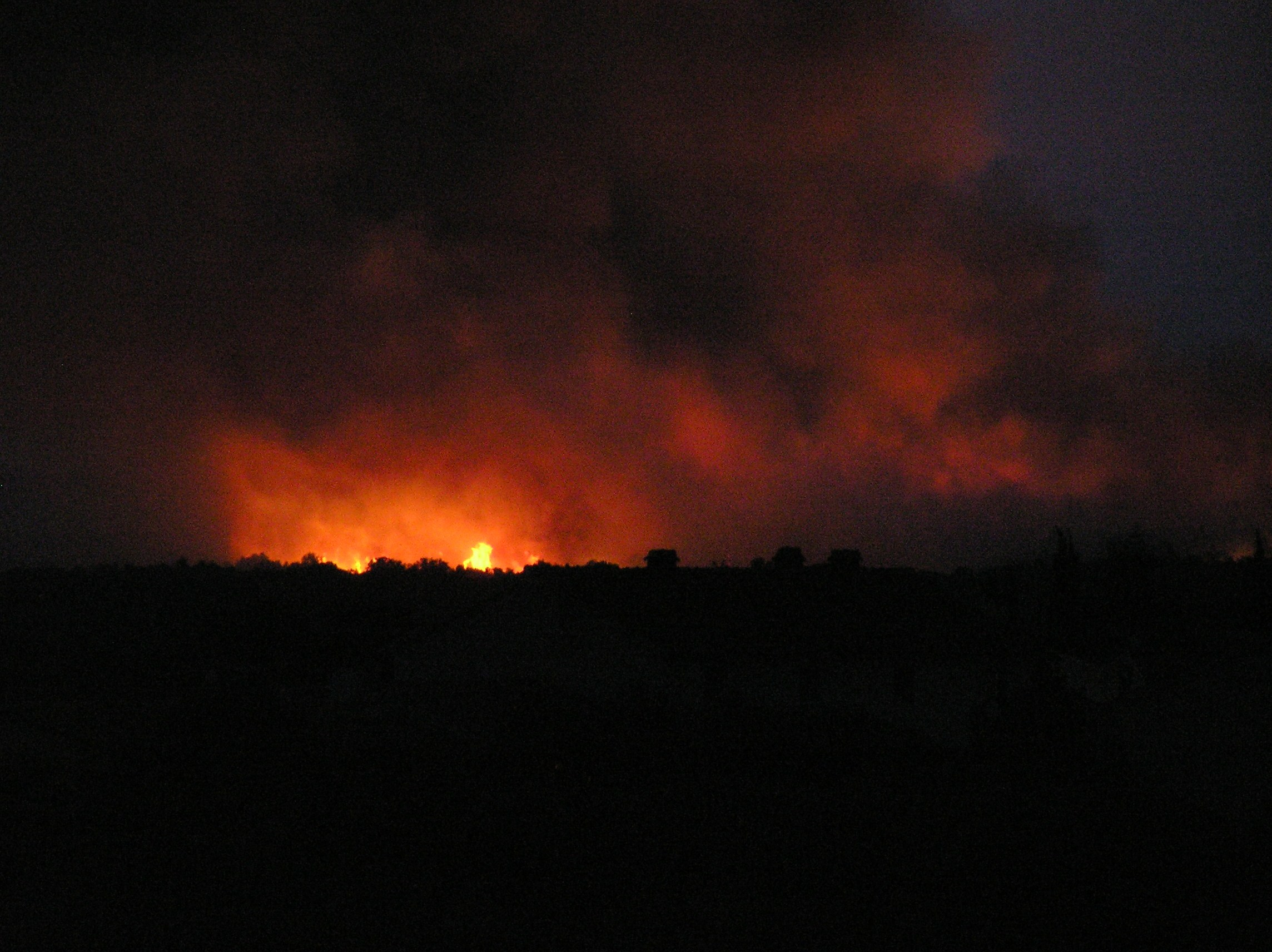
A devastating forest fire in Istria

The 2007 Croatian coast fires (Croatian: Požari u Hrvatskoj 2007) were a series of fires that struck the Croatian coast in the summer of 2007. After a heat wave, which covered Southern and Eastern Europe, resulting drought and southern winds helped spread the fires all over the Croatian coast, destroying a large part of vulnerable plant and animal life.

There were 750 fires on the coast from 1 June to 8 August. They burned in Istria County, Zadar County, Šibenik-Knin County, Split-Dalmatia County and Dubrovnik-Neretva County. The total burned area covered 159,000 hectares.

The police indicted 18 persons and arrested 12 for arson. Those arrested included an unnamed 56-year-old suspected of setting seven fires and some shepherds who burned grass for sheep. When fires broke out in the region of Dubrovnik, the local authorities accused the Herzegovinian town of Trebinje of deliberately setting fires. Tragedy struck when, of the 23 firefighters sent to a burning island of Kornat, 12 were killed by fast moving brush fires, one was severely injured, and ten were forced to leave before they could extinguish the blaze themselves.

== Fires in Istria ==
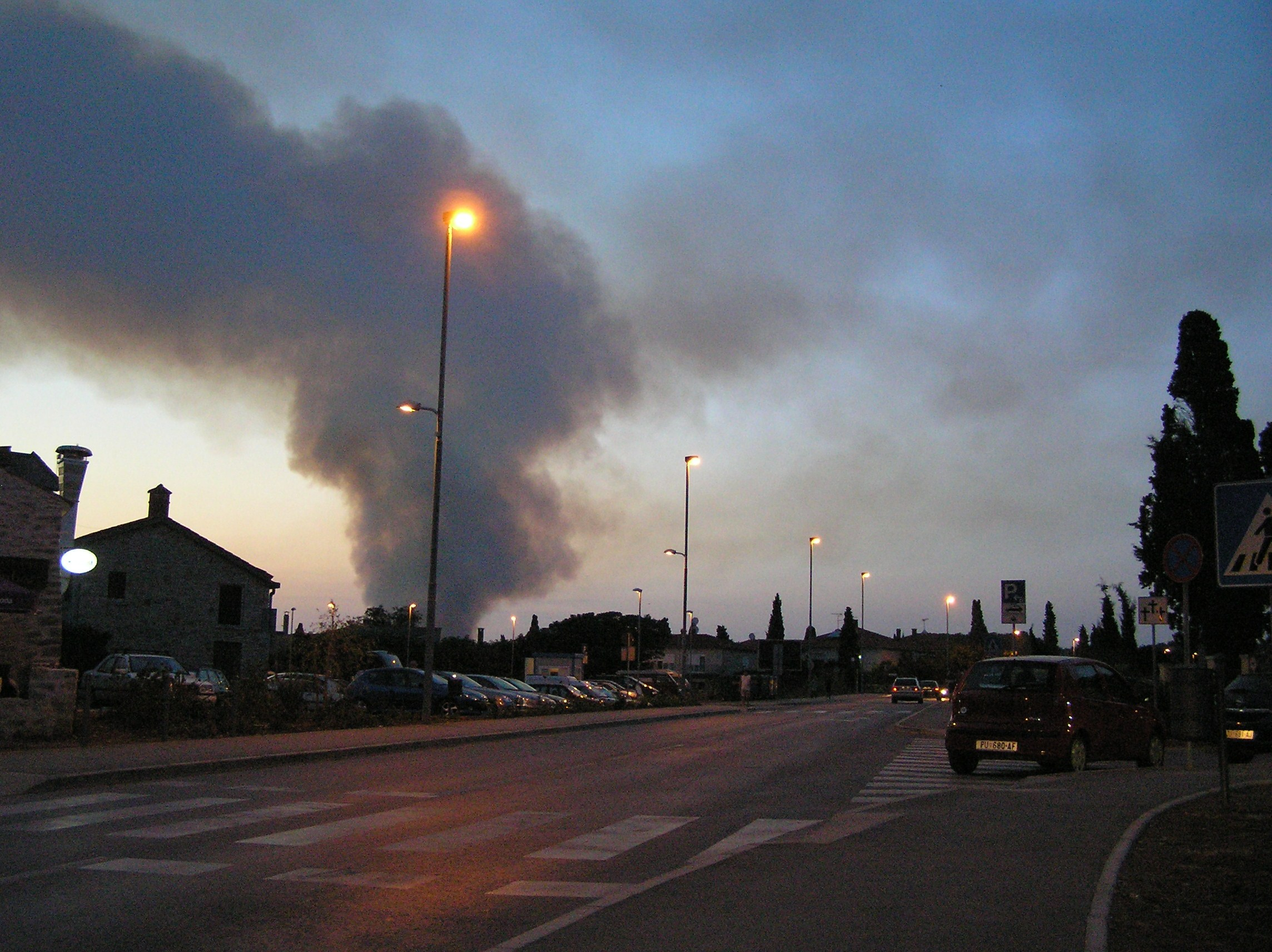
Fire near Pula

On 19 July, a fire broke out near Pula. The Croatian Automobile Club reported that the Pula-Premantura county road had to be closed in the section from the Banjole crossroads to Premantura.

On 27 July, ten new fires broke out in the Istrian region. Two large fires–near the Pineta Trailer Park in Peroj near Pula and near the Amarin Trailer Park in Rovinj–were soon localized.

On 7 August, there was a fire between Batvači, Peroj and Barbariga, in the municipality of Vodnjan. It was localized around 7:30 PM by a Canadair CL-415 airplane and a helicopter that started extinguishing the fire around 6 PM. The fire, which was spreading because of the wind and the unapproachable terrain, was extinguished by 90 firefighters and 22 fire engines. The fire burned 80 hectares of forests and brush.

== Fires in Dalmatia ==
There were several fires in Dalmatia in July and August. The first fire broke out in the afternoon of 26 July, on Veliki Rujan, which is right next to the Paklenica National Park. The most endangered area was the southeast part of the National Park. The fire was fought by more than 200 firemen, National Park employees and members of the Croatian Army. The firemen received reinforcements during the next days. There were also two firefighting planes and a helicopter. A fire broke out on the Svilaja Mountain, but it was soon localized.

The fire near Podstražje, a village by the Rukavac Cove on the island of Vis, was localized on 7 August by the professionals and volunteers from Vis and Komiža, with 46 firemen and nine fire engines. The August fire near Lake Vrana was soon localized.

On 8 August, a fire broke out around Žitnić, spreading to the mined area along the Šibenik-Drniš state road, which was closed for traffic. 21 professional and volunteer firemen and six fire engines from Drniš fought it.

=== Kornati tragedy ===
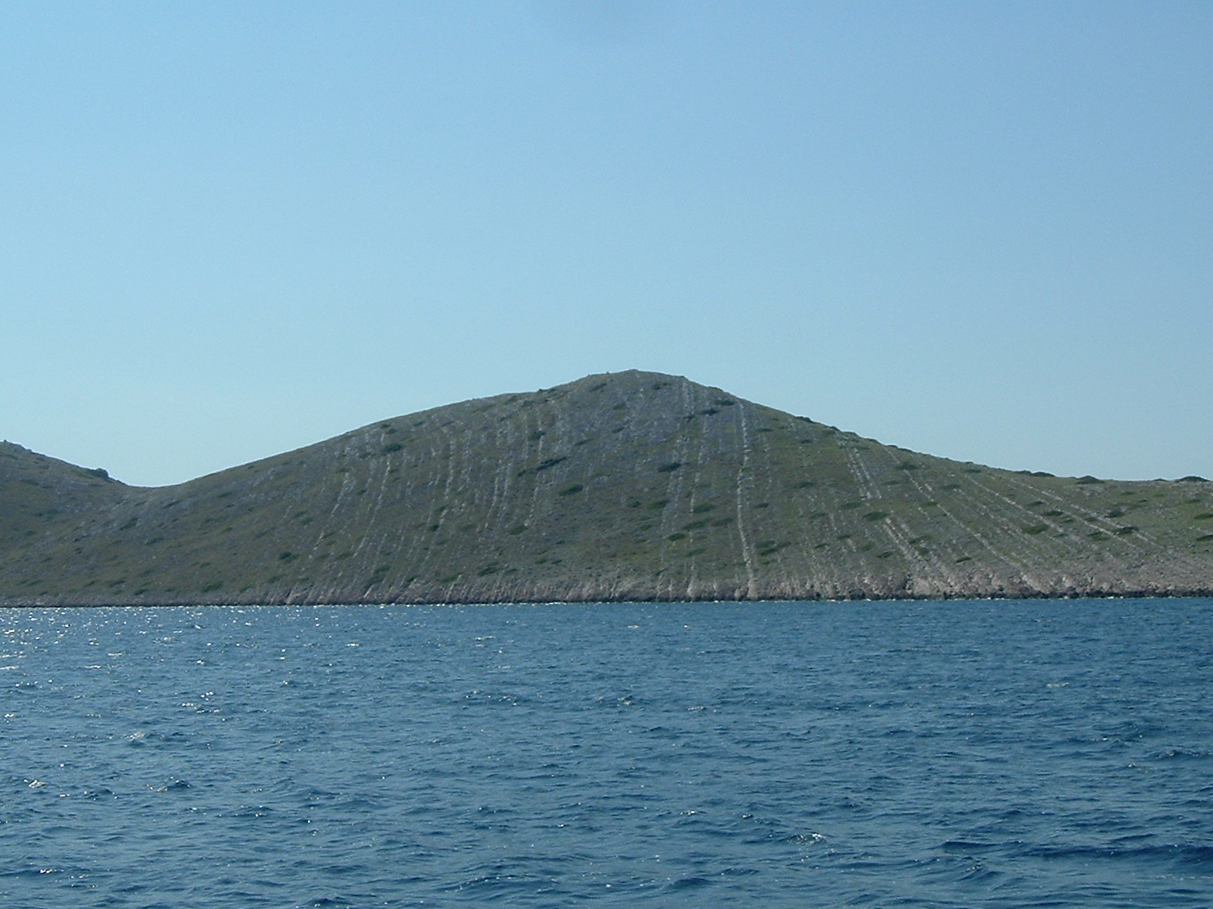
Kornati in May 2003

On 30 August, a new fire broke out on the island of Kornat, part of the Kornati National park. A team of 23 firemen was sent on an Mi-8 helicopter on what they thought would be just a routine mission. Upon arrival, they split into two teams, one with six firemen and the other with 17. The latter split up one more time when three firemen lost their communication gear, and again when the fourth one went checking for the signal while trying to call his superiors. The remaining 13 were stranded between two hills with no water whatsoever, since the large water canister landed 500 meters away from them. While searching for it, they got encircled by a wall of fire. Although the burning grass was only 10 cm tall, the firemen did not have the necessary equipment and had nowhere to run. In only a minute, six of them were killed instantly, while the other seven remained lying on the ground, badly burned, waiting for help for more than two hours. After the rescue, they were sent to the hospital in Zadar and then transferred to hospitals in Zagreb and Split. Six of them died due to serious burns covering large areas of their bodies. The fire itself had nowhere to spread, and was soon naturally extinguished, bringing up many questions about the necessity of the intervention. Allegedly, the firemen were killed by an unexploded CBU-87 dumped over Kornat by NATO planes returning from the Kosovo War in 1999.

== Fires around Dubrovnik ==
On 5 August, several fires broke out in the Dubrovnik-Neretva County. At 10 PM, the sirens sounded the general alarm because the fire came close to the city of Dubrovnik itself. Mayor of Dubrovnik, Dubravka Šuica, called all the able men to help the firemen. A shelter for women, children and old people was made in the Revelin Fortress. The firemen from the Split-Dalmatia County and the Šibenik-Knin County helped fight the fire. The fire spread to Žarkovica, a couple of hundred meters from the first city houses. On the other side, the fire reached Komolac and endangered the main power station. The state road was closed in the section from Konavle to Zaton, so the drivers there had to spend the night waiting on the road. The most desperate situation was around Mokošica, where the 20-kilometer fire came down to the houses, burning one house in Šumet.

On 8 August, a forest fire broke out in the municipality of Konavle. It was fought by the county firemen and the state intervention forces of Dubrovnik, with 50 firemen and 15 fire engines. They were helped by three Canadair CL-415 airplanes and an Air Tractor. Firefighting was made more difficult by the strong wind and drought. Some tourists were evacuated from local hotels.

The fires near Dubrovnik were well-publicized by international media.

== International accusations of arson ==
On 6 August and 7 August, Prime Minister Ivo Sanader visited Dubrovnik, which was followed by fires in that area. It prompted some county officials to make arson accusations against the nearby town of Trebinje in the neighboring Bosnia and Herzegovina. Mario Magud, the firefighting commander in Konavle, said: "There are no firemen on the Trebinje side. Everything indicates that they set the fire themselves with the intention to burn Konavle and beyond. It's not a coincidence that, as soon as we localize one fire, a new fire breaks out." Luka Korda, the chief of Konavle municipality, made similar accusations. The Herzegovinian civil defense secretary Stanko Slišković said it was not true that the Herzegovinian firemen did not do anything to prevent fires in the border area near Dubrovnik: "Our people made the greatest effort to fight every fire where it was possible. Nobody can say with certainty where a fire started... I'm sorry this happened and I understand the indignation of the citizens of Dubrovnik, but it's not our fault." He claimed that the Herzegovinian civil defense cooperated well with their Croatian counterparts and said that the Herzegovinian forces could not fight the fires in the inaccessible or mined areas.

== See also ==
- 2007 Greek forest fires
- 2007 European heat wave
