= Ravna Sika (Kornati) =

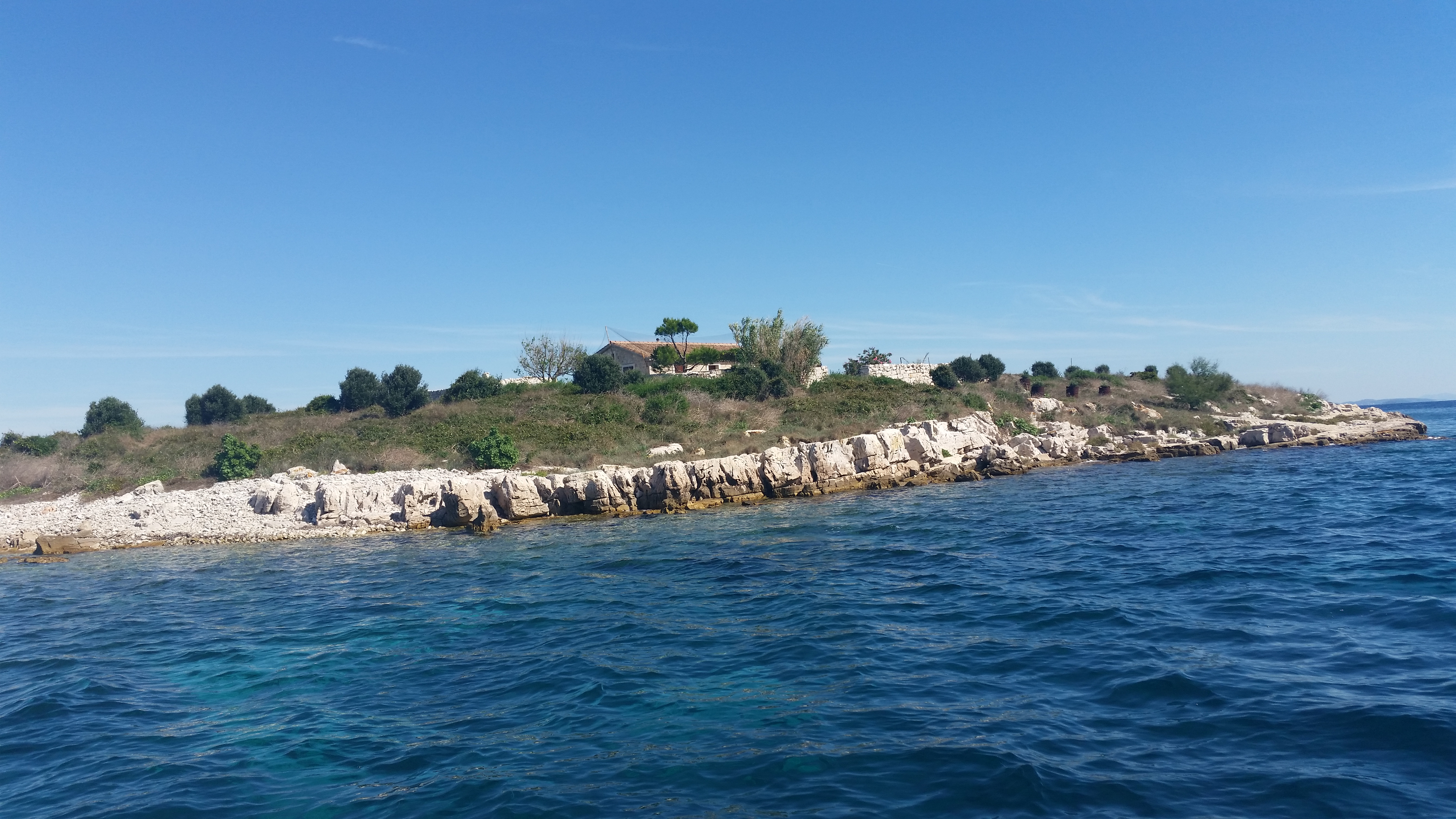
- Ravna Sika in 2015
- Interactive map of Ravna Sika

Geography
- Location: Adriatic Sea
- Coordinates: 43°54′22″N 15°17′39″E
- Archipelago: Kornati
- Adjacent to: Žut and Sit
- Area: 9,365 m^{2} (100,800 sq ft)
- Length: 150 m (490 ft)
- Width: 95 m (312 ft)
- Coastline: 400 m (1300 ft)
- Highest elevation: 6 m (20 ft)

Administration
- Croatia

Demographics
- Population: 0 (2021)

Ravna Sika is an uninhabited island in the Croatian part of the Adriatic Sea. It is situated between Žut to the south and Sit to the north. It is 150 m long, 95 m wide, and rises 6 m above sea level. The island's coast is 400 m long, with a total surface of 9365 m^{2}.

Despite the fact that private ownership of islands is illegal under Croatian law, since their coasts are state-owned and protected as common good, the owner of a parcel of land on the island has put up an "Island for rent" sign on its coast, alongside a telephone number. When contacted by a reporter, she claimed that it is not the entire island that is rented out, but the land on it, which is otherwise uninhabited. Other online marketing materials also features slogans such as "an island only for you", going so far as to explicitly claim that the island is "privately owned in its entirety" and features a "private beach", even though renting out beaches is strictly forbidden by law. The Croatian magazine Miss7 also advertises Ravna Sika in its article "7 Private Islands Around the World", stating that "you can reserve the island all for yourself". Such a practice would be illegal, as any person may by law freely land on the island and use its coast.
