= Katina =

Katina may refer to

- Katina (name)
- Katina, Bulgaria, a village in Bulgaria
- Katina (Star Fox planet)
- Katina ceremony, a Buddhist festival
- Katina (film), 1942 US production with Jack Oakie and Sonja Henie, also known as Iceland
- Katina (island), an island in Croatia
- Katina P, Greek oil tanker
- Katina, a short story written by Roald Dahl
