= Klobučar =

Klobučar is a Croatian, Serbian and Slovenian surname (from word klobučar, which means "hatter" in South Slavic languages) and toponym, which may refer to:

== People with the surname ==
- Anđelko Klobučar (1931–2016), Croatian composer, organist and professor
- Berislav Klobučar (1924–2014), Croatian opera conductor
- Jaka Klobučar (born 1987), Slovenian basketball player
- Jan Klobučar (born 1992), Slovenian volleyball player
- Mira Klobučar (1888–1956), Croatian painter

== Geography ==
- Klobučar (island), uninhabited island in Croatia

== See also ==
- Klobuchar (surname)
