= Katin =

Katin or Katina is the surname of the following people:

- Brendan Katin (born 1983), American baseball player
- Miriam Katin (born 1942), Hungarian-born American graphic novelist
- Peter Katin (1930–2015), British classical pianist and pedagogue
- Lena Katina (born 1984), Russian singer and songwriter

Katin is also a given name, a variant of Katherine, and is used for males (boys) other than females (girls), and is used in two different famous athletes:

- Katin Houser
- Katin Reinhardt

== See also ==
- Katina (disambiguation)
