= Levrnaka =

Island in Croatia

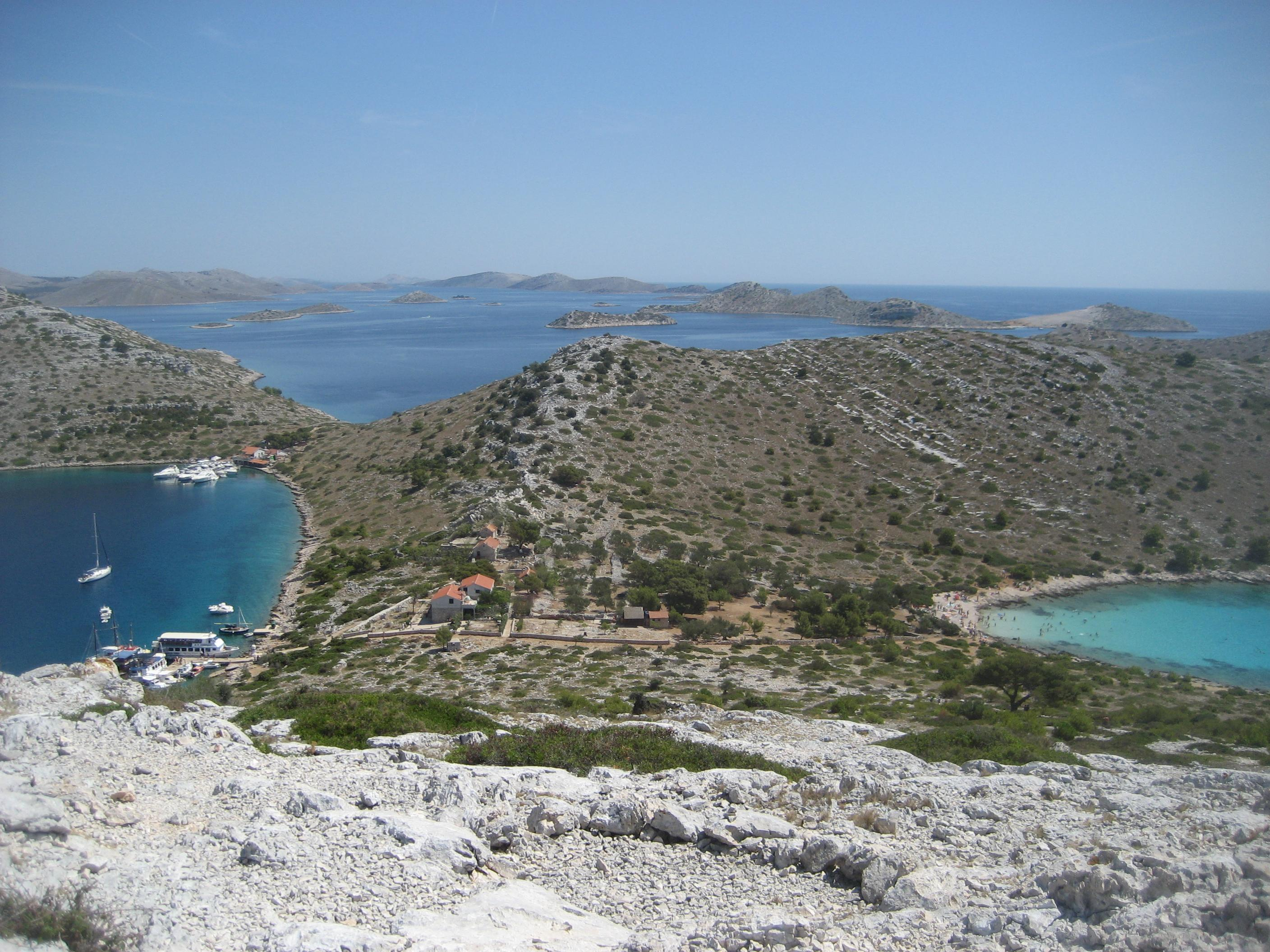
- Levrnaka

- Location within Croatia
- Interactive map of Levrnaka

Geography
- Location: Adriatic Sea
- Coordinates: 43°49′36″N 15°14′56″E
- Archipelago: Kornati Islands
- Area: 1.84 km^{2} (0.71 sq mi)

Administration
- Croatia
- County: Šibenik-Knin County

Demographics
- Population: 0

Levrnaka is an uninhabited Croatian island in the Adriatic Sea located southwest of Kornat. Its area is 1.84 km^{2} (0.71 sq mi).

In the bay, there are several houses that are used summer only. Otherwise the island is without inhabitants. The harbor is protected from all winds.
