= Kurba Vela =

Island in Croatia

- Location within Croatia
- Interactive map of Kurba Vela

Geography
- Location: Adriatic Sea
- Coordinates: 43°42′1″N 15°29′22″E
- Archipelago: Kornati Islands
- Area: 1.74 km^{2} (0.67 sq mi)
- Highest elevation: 117 m (384 ft)
- Highest point: Južna glava

Administration
- Croatia
- County: Šibenik-Knin County

Demographics
- Population: 0

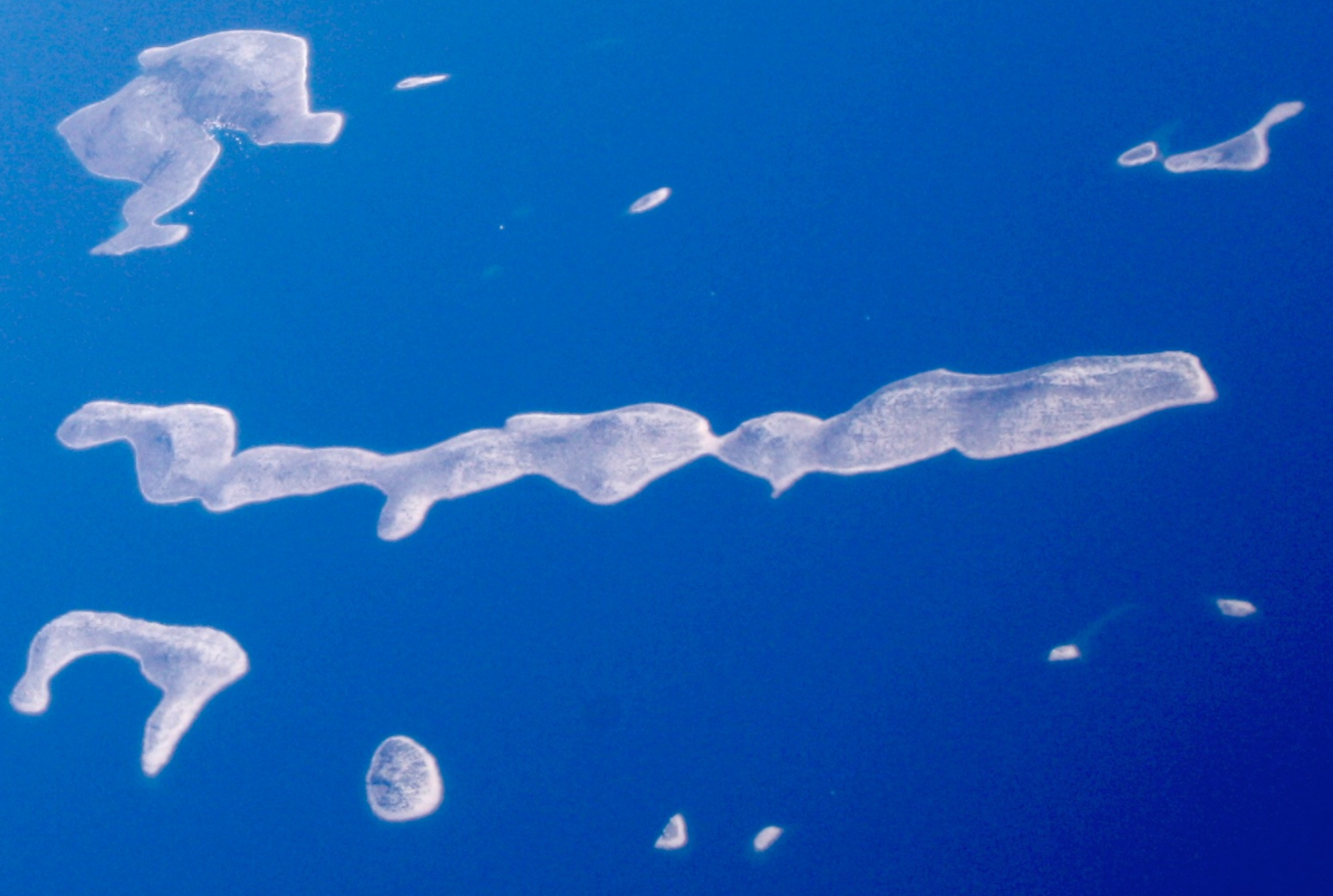

Kurba Vela is an uninhabited Croatian island in the Adriatic Sea located southeast of Kornat. Its area is 1.74 km^{2} (0.67 sq mi).
