= Klobučar (island) =

Island in Croatia

- Interactive map of Klobučar

Geography
- Location: Adriatic Sea
- Coordinates: 43°44′31″N 15°22′56″E
- Archipelago: Kornati islands
- Area: 0.116 km^{2} (0.045 sq mi)

Administration
- Croatia
- County: Šibenik-Knin

Demographics
- Population: uninhabited

Klobučar is an uninhabited island in Croatia. It is part of the Kornati archipelago, located in between the islands of Lavsa and Kasela. It is 0.166 km^{2} in area and has a coastline of 1.425 km. The highest point is 82 meters above sea.
