= Smokvica Vela (Kornat) =

Island in Croatia

Nickname: Šmokvica
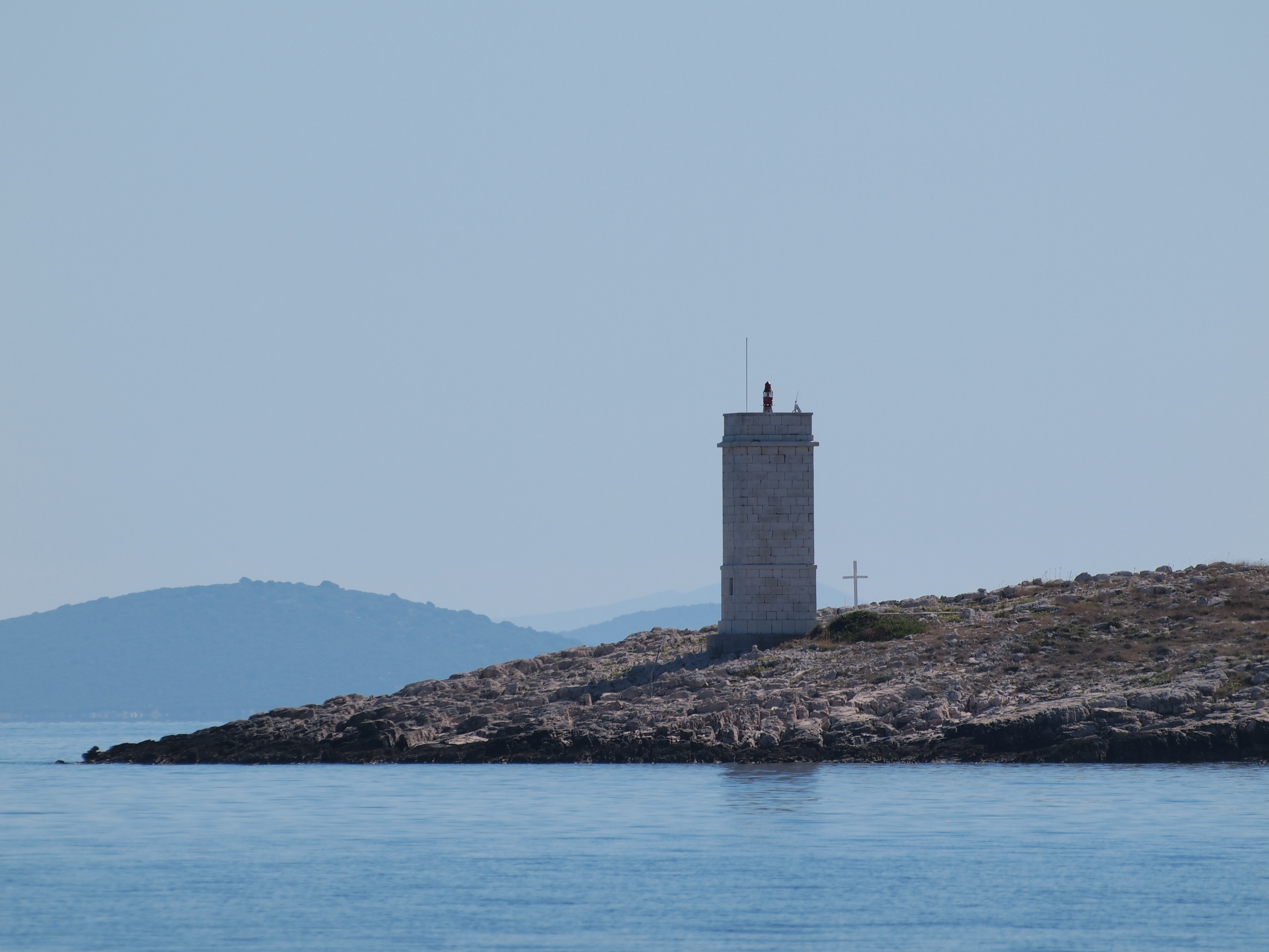
- Smokvica Vela Lighthouse

- Location within Croatia
- Interactive map of Smokvica Vela

Geography
- Location: Adriatic Sea
- Coordinates: 43°43′49″N 15°28′18″E
- Archipelago: Kornati Islands
- Area: 1.05 km^{2} (0.41 sq mi)
- Highest elevation: 95 m (312 ft)
- Highest point: Veli vrh

Administration
- Croatia
- County: Šibenik-Knin County

Demographics
- Population: 0

Smokvica Vela is an uninhabited Croatian island in the Adriatic Sea located southeast of Kornat. Its area is 1.05 km^{2} (0.41 sq mi). Lojena Bay is located on the southeast part of the island, exposed to the jugo wind and sheltered from other winds. The northern tip of the island is marked by a lighthouse.
