= Piškera =

- Location within Croatia
- Interactive map of Piškera

Geography
- Location: Adriatic Sea
- Coordinates: 43°46′15″N 15°20′13″E
- Archipelago: Kornati islands
- Area: 2.66 km^{2} (1.03 sq mi)
- Highest elevation: 126 m (413 ft)

Administration
- Croatia
- County: Šibenik-Knin County

Piškera (also called Jadra) is a small uninhabited Croatian island in the Adriatic Sea. It is one of the Kornati Islands in central Dalmatia and its area is 2.66 km^{2}. Its coastline is 10.64 km long.

A fishing settlement of the same name, established on the island in the 16th century, was gradually abandoned after the demise of the Republic of Venice in the late 18th century. The island's name is derived from peschiera, Italian for "fish farm".

A marina with 118 berths operated by ACI Club, located off the coast of an adjacent isle of Panitula Vela, is open between April and October every year.

== See also ==
- Kornati Islands

== Bibliography ==
- Skračić, Vladimir (2001). "Kolonatsko gospodarstvo u zaštićenom prostoru Nacionalnog parka Kornati" [Tenant Farmers' Economy in the Kornati National Park Protected Area] (PDF). Sociologija I Prostor (in Croatian). 39 (1/4 (151/154)): 297–317.
- Sorić, Sofija (2013). "Ribarsko naselje Piškera u prošlosti" [The fishing settlement Piškera in the past]. In Skračić, Vladimir (ed.). Toponimija kornatskog otočja [The Toponymy of the Kornati Isles]. Onomastica Adriatica (in Croatian). pp. 159–169. ISBN 978-953-331-039-8.
