= Žut =

Island of Croatia

Coordinates: 43°52′N 15°19′E

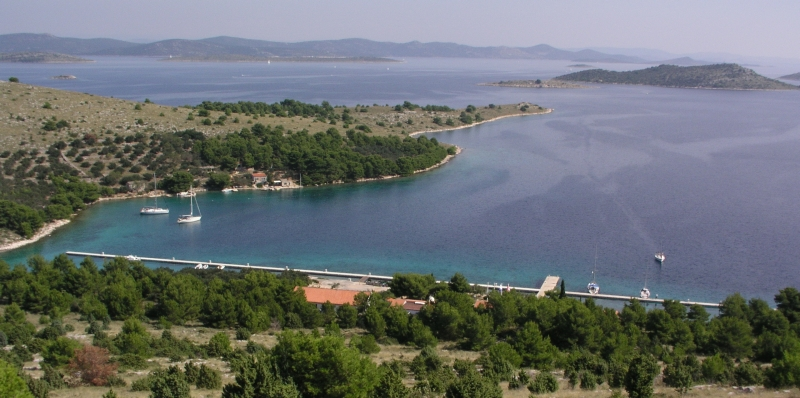
- The Žut marina

- Location within Croatia
- Interactive map of Žut

Geography
- Location: Adriatic Sea
- Archipelago: Kornati
- Area: 14.83 km^{2} (5.73 sq mi)
- Highest elevation: 174 m (571 ft)
- Highest point: Gubavac peak

Administration
- Croatia
- County: Šibenik-Knin County

Demographics
- Population: 0 (2000)

Žut (pronounced [ʒûːt]) is an uninhabited island in the Croatian part of the Adriatic Sea, in central Dalmatia. With an area of 14.83 km^{2} (5.73 sq mi) it is the 28th largest island in Croatia and the second largest island in the Kornati archipelago, after Kornat. Although most of the archipelago, composed of 89 islands, islets and rocks, is included in the Kornati National Park, the island of Žut is not.

Žut is located between the islands of Pašman and Kornat and its coastline is unusually long at 45.9 kilometres (28.5 miles), thanks to the large number of coves and bays. The island's highest point is the Gubavac peak at 174 m (571 ft) above sea level.

Due to centuries of slash-and-burn practices, Žut is almost barren of maquis shrubland, otherwise common in most Adriatic islands. There is no farmland on the island, and it never had any permanent settlements. Today, there is a 135-berth marina on the island, with a restaurant and a grocery store, operated by ACI Club and open from April to October.

In historical sources, the island has been referred to as Xut, Iunctus, Zuth and Zunchio. Although the island's name might suggest it (Žut is "yellow" in Croatian), it is not Slavic in origin, being derived from Latin junctus ("adjacent", "close"), which refers either to the island's closeness to Kornat, or its former status as a part of private property on Kornat.

According to measurements done in the early 2000s, Žut is also the largest uninhabited island in Croatia, being almost 2 km^{2} (0.8 sq mi) larger than Prvić near Krk, which had previously been thought to hold this distinction.

== See also ==
- Kornati
- Sit (island)
- List of islands of Croatia

== Sources ==
- Filipi, Amos Rube (December 2003). "Povijesno-geografska obilježja Žutsko-sitske otočne skupine" [Historical-Geographical Features of the Žut-Sit Island Group, Croatia] (PDF). Geoadria (in Croatian). 8 (2): 87–130.
