= Tijat =

Island of Croatia

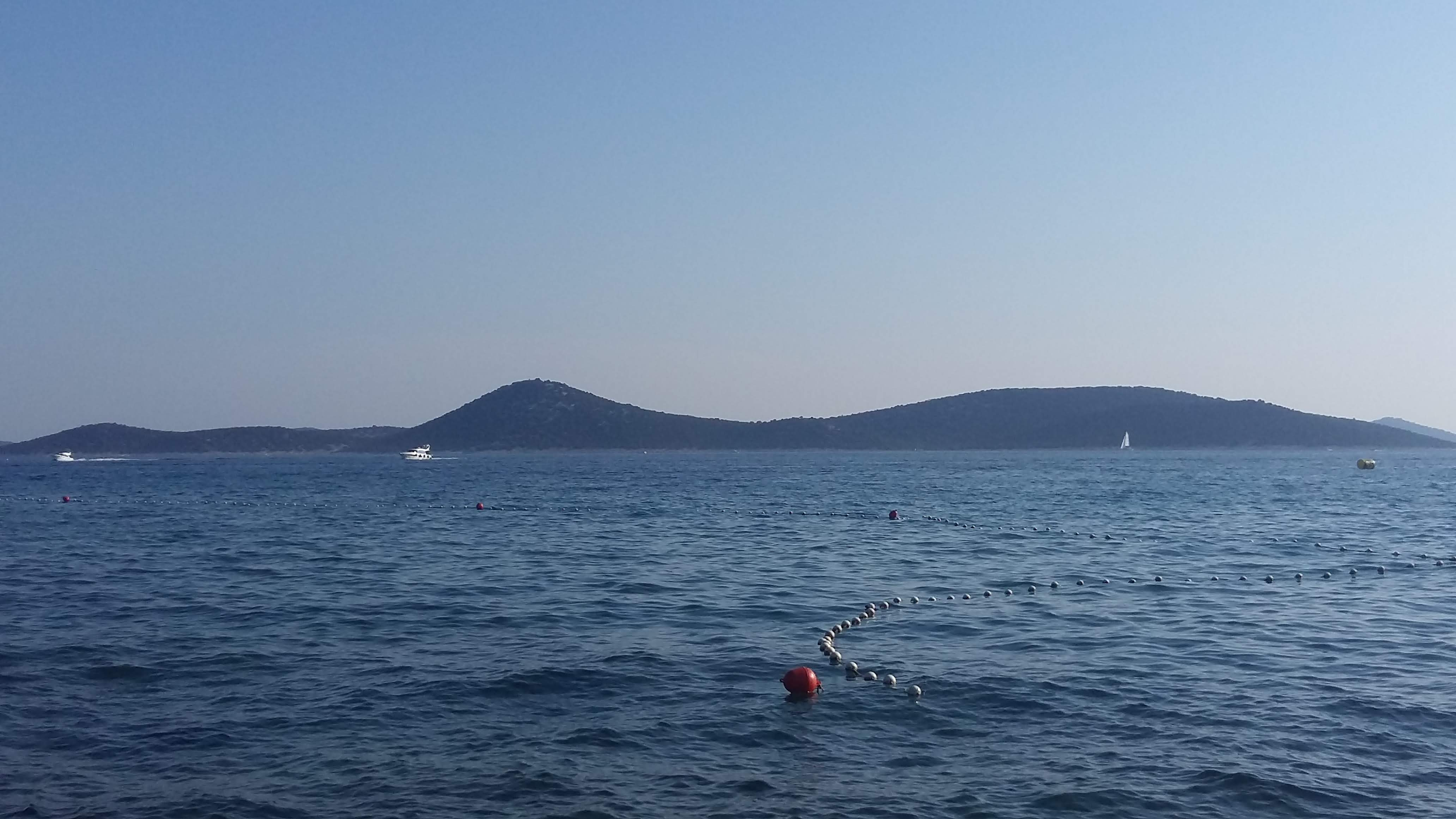
- View from Vodice

- Location within Croatia
- Interactive map of Tijat

Geography
- Location: Adriatic Sea
- Coordinates: 43°43′21″N 15°45′50″E
- Archipelago: Kornati Islands
- Area: 2.78 km^{2} (1.07 sq mi)
- Highest elevation: 119 m (390 ft)
- Highest point: Vela glava

Administration
- Croatia
- County: Šibenik-Knin County

Demographics
- Population: 0

Tijat is an uninhabited Croatian island in the Adriatic Sea located southwest of Vodice and west of Prvić. Its area is 2.78 km^{2} (1.07 sq mi).

The land is mostly owned by people of Šepurina from island Prvić.

Tijašćica bay is located on the southeast part of the island, exposed to the jugo wind and sheltered from other winds. There is a restaurant in the bay.
