= Klobuchar (surname) =

Klobuchar is a surname, originating from the Croatian, Slovene and Serbian language surname Klobučar.

People with this surname include:

- Amy Klobuchar (born 1960), American politician
- Anna Klobuchar Clemenc (1888–1956), American labor activist
- Jim Klobuchar (1928–2021), American journalist, author, and travel guide, father of Amy

== See also ==
- Klobučar (disambiguation)
