= Kakan (island) =

Island of Croatia

Coordinates: 43°41′30″N 15°39′45″E

Map

Kakan is an uninhabited island (3.124 km^{2} (1.206 sq mi)) in Croatia, adjacent to Kaprije.
