= Dolin (island) =

Island of Croatia

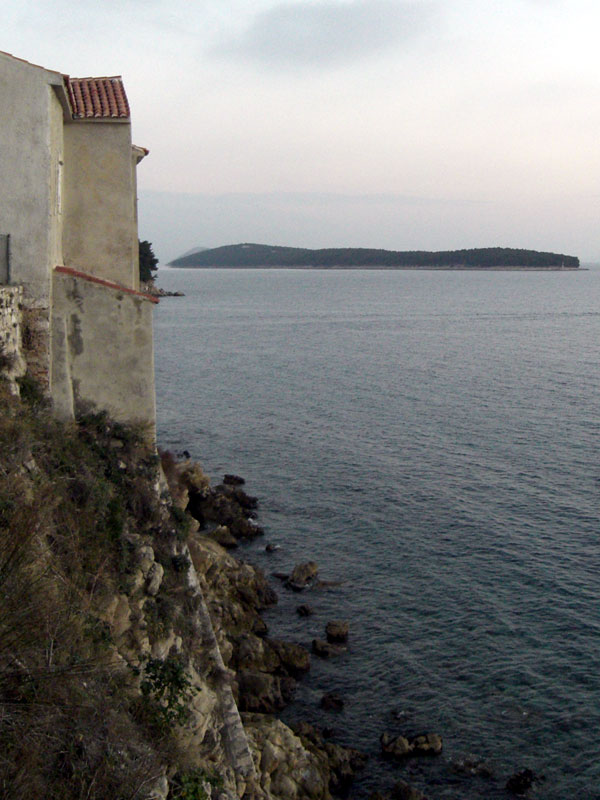
- Dolin Island, view from the town of Rab

- Location within Croatia
- Interactive map of Dolin

Geography
- Location: Adriatic Sea
- Coordinates: 44°42′43″N 14°48′48″E
- Archipelago: Kvarner Gulf
- Area: 4.61 km^{2} (1.78 sq mi)

Administration
- Croatia
- County: Primorje-Gorski Kotar County

Demographics
- Population: 0 (2001)

Dolin is a small uninhabited island in the Croatian part of the Adriatic Sea. It is located in the Kvarner Gulf, just off the southern coast of the island of Rab. Its area is 4.61 km^{2} and its coastline is 18.5 km long.

== See also ==
- Rab
- Kvarner Gulf
