= Arta Velika =

Island in Croatia

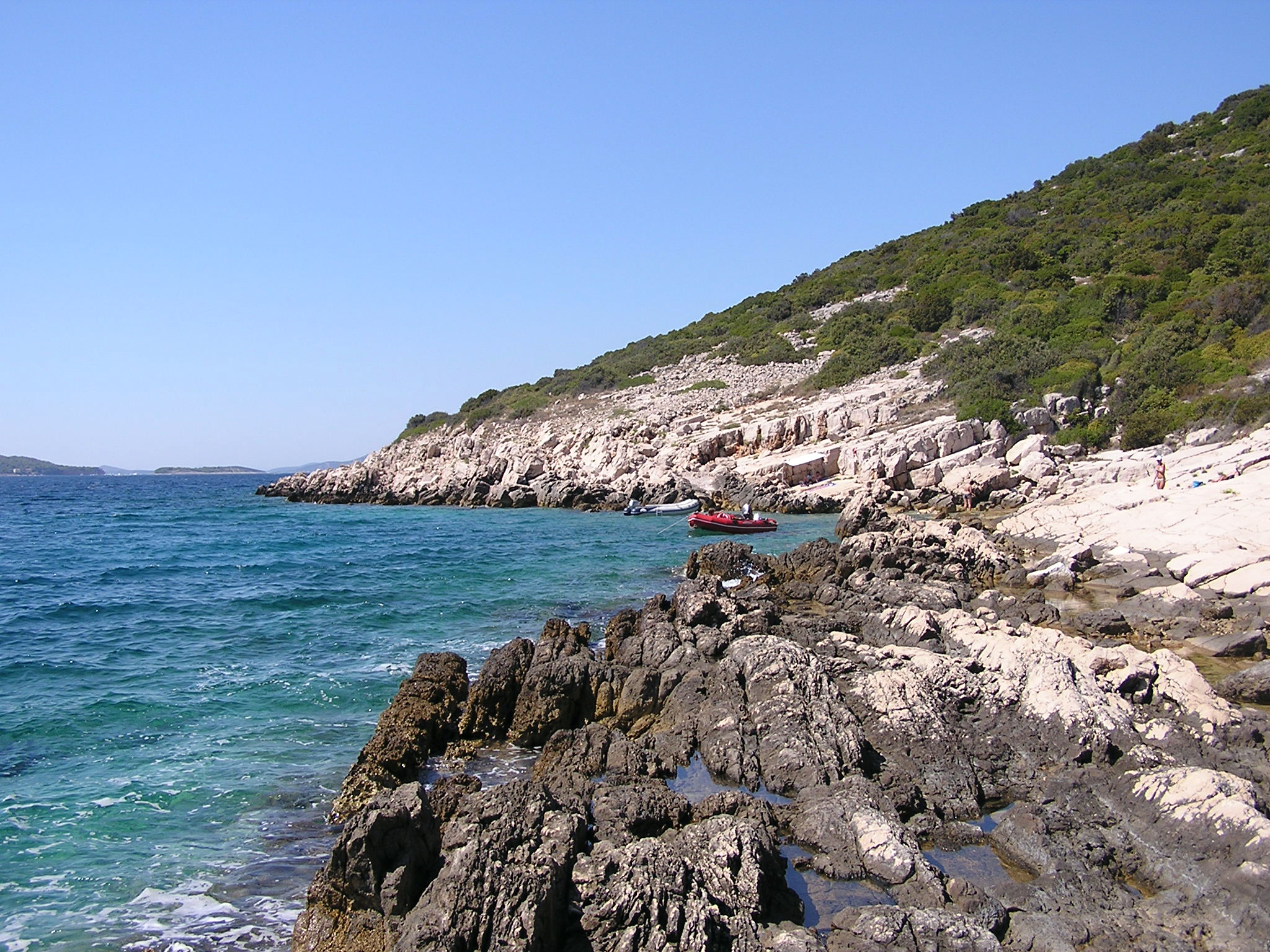
- Southern coast of Arta Velika

- Location within Croatia
- Interactive map of Arta Velika

Geography
- Location: Adriatic Sea
- Coordinates: 43°51′28″N 15°32′30″E
- Archipelago: Šibenik archipelago
- Area: 1.27 km^{2} (0.49 sq mi)
- Coastline: 5.53 km (3.436 mi)
- Highest elevation: 95 m (312 ft)
- Highest point: Vela Glava

Administration
- Croatia
- County: Šibenik-Knin County

Demographics
- Population: 0

Arta Velika (also Arta Vela) is an uninhabited island in Croatia, in central Dalmatia, part of the Šibenik archipelago off the coast of the city of Šibenik. It lies 2.5 km northwest of the island of Murter and the settlement nearest to the island is Pakoštane, 5 km away on the mainland. The island's area is 1.27 km^{2} and its coastline is 5.53 km long. Arta Mala Island is the closest neighboring island at 0.83 miles away. The highest point on the island is Velika Glava, which is 95 meters high.

The Catalan Atlas of Charles V of France called it Artadurus.

== Bibliography ==
- Šenoa, Milan (1949). "Prilog poznavanju starih naziva naših otoka" [A Contribution to Learning the Old Names of Our Islands]. Hrvatski geografski glasnik (in Serbo-Croatian) (11–12) (published 1950-06-15): 75–82. ISSN 1331-5854.
