= Zeča =

Island of Croatia

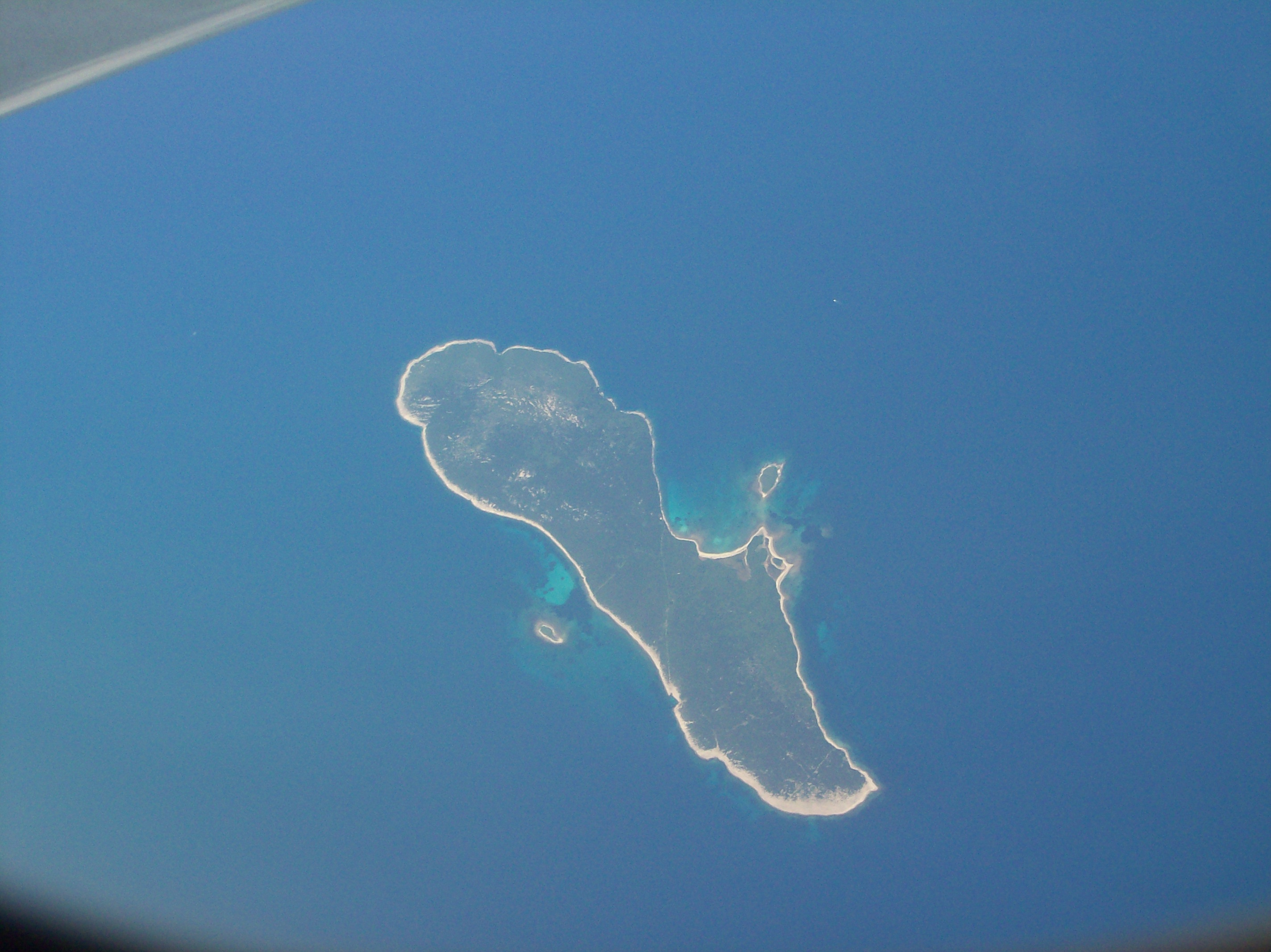
- Aerial view

- Location within Croatia
- Interactive map of Zeča

Geography
- Location: Adriatic Sea
- Coordinates: 44°46′18″N 14°18′45″E
- Archipelago: Cres-Lošinj
- Area: 2.55 km^{2} (0.98 sq mi)

Administration
- Croatia
- County: Primorje-Gorski Kotar County

Demographics
- Population: 0

Zeča is an uninhabited Croatian island in the Adriatic Sea located southwest of Cres. Its area is 2.55 km^{2} (0.98 sq mi).

== In popular culture ==
In the collaborative writing project website SCP Foundation, the island Zeča is called as SCP-2248, which is classified as Safe Class.
