= Zmajan =

Island of Croatia

Nickname: Orut
- Location within Croatia

Geography
- Location: Adriatic Sea
- Coordinates: 43.690723°N 15.755669°E
- Area: 3.3 km^{2} (1.3 sq mi)

Administration
- Croatia
- County: Šibenik-Knin County

Demographics
- Population: 0

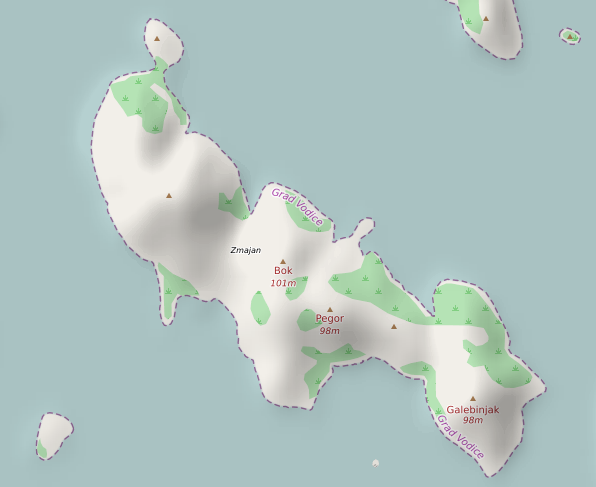
Map of Zmajan

Zmajan is an uninhabited Croatian island in the Adriatic Sea located south-southwest of Vodice and west of Zlarin. Its area is 3.3 km^{2} (1.3 sq mi).
