= Tun Veli =

Uninhibited Croatian Island

- Location within Croatia
- Interactive map of Tun Veli

Geography
- Location: Adriatic Sea
- Coordinates: 44°11′17″N 14°54′32″E
- Area: 2.21 km^{2} (0.85 sq mi)

Administration
- Croatia
- County: Zadar County

Demographics
- Population: 0

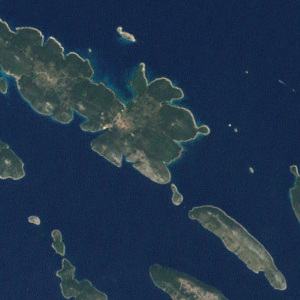
Croatian Islands in Adriatic Sea

Tun Veli is an uninhabited Croatian island in the Adriatic Sea located southeast of Molat. Its area is 2.21 km^{2} (0.85 sq mi).
