= Katina (name) =

Katina is a Greek feminine name, a variant of the name Katherine. It was among the top 1,000 names for newborn girls in the United States between 1972 and 1982. The popularity of the name in the United States coincided with the birth of a baby called Katina on the American soap opera Where the Heart Is in 1972.

It may refer to:

== Given name ==
- Katina D'Onise, Australian public health researcher
- Katina Kramos (born 1972), Greek softball player
- Katina Papa (1903–1959), Greek author
- Katina Paxinou (1900–1973), Greek film and stage actress
- Katina Proestakis (born 2002), Chilean fencer
- Katina Schubert (born 1961), German politician

== Surname ==
- Lena Katina (born 1984), Russian singer and songwriter

== Other spellings ==
- Katyna Ranieri (1925–2018), born Caterina Ranieri, Italian singer

== See also ==
- Katina (orca) (born 1975), female orca living in Florida
- The Katinas, a contemporary Christian music group
