= Adriatic Croatia International Club =

Nautical tourism company based in Rijeka, Croatia

Adriatic Croatia International Club d.d.
- Type: Public
- Traded as: ZSE: ACI
- Industry: Nautical tourism
- Founded: 1 July 1983
- Headquarters: Rijeka, Croatia
- Key people: Ankica Kruljac (chair); Ivan Herak
- Net income: ▲€3.40 million (2022)
- Number of employees: 331 (2022)
- Website: www.aci-marinas.com

Adriatic Croatia International Club, commonly referred to as ACI Club or simply ACI, is a Croatian nautical tourism company based in Rijeka which operates a marina chain along the Croatian part of the Adriatic coast. From the initial 16 marinas opened in 1986 they expanded to 22 in 2016, which makes it the largest chain of marinas in the Mediterranean as of 2023. ACI is also known for organizing the annual match racing sailing regatta called the "ACI Match Race Cup", first held in 1987.

== History ==
ACI was originally established on 1 July 1983 as a state-owned company with the aim of promoting nautical tourism. It was originally called Adriatic Club Yugoslavia (ACY), which was changed in 1991 to Adriatic Yacht Club (due to the breakup of Yugoslavia and Croatia's independence), although they continued using the ACY surname. In June 1994, after it underwent privatization, the company was re-established as a joint-stock company, adopted its current name and changed their surname to ACI Club accordingly.

ACI is also the biggest single member of the Croatian Association of Marinas (Croatian: Udruženje hrvatskih marina), the national trade association of around 50 individual marinas operating in Croatian waters, meaning that ACI controls nearly half of all marinas in the country. The company's shares are listed on the Zagreb Stock Exchange (ZSE), although a 79% majority stake is held by the Republic of Croatia, more precisely Ministry of Construction, Spatial Planning and State Property as of November 2023.

== Marinas ==
The company's initial 16 marinas were built between 1982 and 1985 and opened for visitors in the summer of 1986. The marinas in Korčula and Opatija followed and opened in 1989 and 1990. In January 1991 the independently operated Dubrovnik marina was integrated into the company's network and in 1994 marinas at Cres and Šimuni were added. In July 2016 the newest ACI marina opened in Slano, named by ACI's founder Veljko Barbieri. The company thus operates a total of 22 marinas as of 2016, making it the largest single marina chain in the entire Mediterranean. Out of the 22 marinas 18 are open year-round while the remaining four (Palmižana, Piškera, Rab and Žut) operate during summer months only. The northernmost marina is in Umag while the southernmost is in Dubrovnik.

The following is the complete list of ACI marinas:

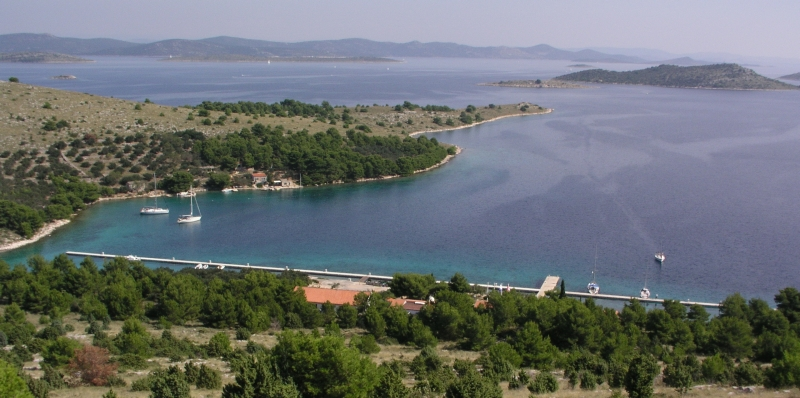
ACI marina on the island of Žut.

Marina	Location	Region	Open	Berths(+Dry)	Coordinates
ACI Cres	Island of Cres	Kvarner	Year-round	440+70	44°57.00′N 14°24.00′E
ACI Dubrovnik	Dubrovnik	Dalmatia - Dubrovnik	Year-round	380+120	42°40.30′N 18°07.00′E
ACI Jezera	Island of Murter	Dalmatia - Šibenik	Year-round	212+40	43°47.10′N 15°39.20′E
ACI Korčula	Island of Korčula	Dalmatia - Dubrovnik	Year-round	159+16	42°57.60′N 17°08.40′E
ACI Milna	Island of Brač	Dalmatia - Split	Year-round	157+15	43°19.60′N 16°27.00′E
ACI Opatija	Opatija	Kvarner	Year-round	283+35	45°19.00′N 14°17.70′E
ACI Palmižana	Island of Sveti Klement	Dalmatia - Split	April–October	180+0	43°09.80′N 16°23.80′E
ACI Piškera	Island of Vela Panitula (hr)	Dalmatia - Šibenik	April–October	118+0	43°45.60′N 15°21.20′E
ACI Pomer	Pula	Istria	Year-round	294+30	44°49.00′N 13°54.00′E
ACI Porto Baroš	Rijeka	Kvarner	under construction	230+0	45°19.33′N 14°26.43′E
ACI Pula	Pula	Istria	Year-round	192+0	44°52.60′N 13°50.00′E
ACI Rab	Island of Rab	Kvarner	April–October	134+0	44°45.40′N 14°46.00′E
ACI Rovinj	Rovinj	Istria	Year-round	196+40	45°04.06′N 13°38.04′E
ACI Šimuni	Island of Pag	Kvarner	Year-round	191+45	43°45.60′N 15°21.20′E
ACI Skradin	Skradin	Dalmatia - Šibenik	Year-round	180+0	43°49.00′N 15°55.60′E
ACI "Veljko Barbieri" Slano	Slano	Dalmatia - Dubrovnik	Year-round	193+0	42°47.00′N 17°53.23′E
ACI Split	Split	Dalmatia - Split	Year-round	318+30	43°30.10′N 16°26.00′E
ACI Supetarska Draga	Island of Rab	Kvarner	Year-round	310+53	44°48.20′N 14°43.80′E
ACI Trogir	Trogir	Dalmatia - Split	Year-round	174+35	43°30.80′N 16°15.20′E
ACI Umag	Umag	Istria	Year-round	475+40	45°26.02′N 13°31.00′E
ACI Vodice	Vodice	Dalmatia - Šibenik	Year-round	382+55	43°45.20′N 15°47.00′E
ACI Vrboska	Island of Hvar	Dalmatia - Split	Year-round	119+12	43°10.80′N 16°41.00′E
ACI Žut	Island of Žut	Dalmatia - Šibenik	April–October	120+0	43°53.20′N 15°17.40′E

== Match race cup ==
ACI also organizes the annual match racing sailing event called "ACI Match Race Cup". First held in 1987, it usually takes place in the waters near Rovinj or Split. Race results are counted towards the International Sailing Federation World Rankings. Irish skipper Harold Cudmore won the inaugural event in 1987, and Australian Peter Gilmour has most wins overall, winning the event five times (in 1993, 1994, 1995, 1997 and 2005).

The following is the complete list of winning skippers:

- 1987 – Harold Cudmore (IRL)
- 1988 – Chris Dickson (NZL)
- 1989 – Paul Cayard (USA)
- 1990 – Paul Cayard (USA)
- 1991 – Russell Coutts (NZL)
- 1992 – Chris Dickson (NZL)
- 1993 – Peter Gilmour (AUS)
- 1994 – Peter Gilmour (AUS)
- 1995 – Peter Gilmour (AUS)
- 1996 – Russell Coutts (NZL)
- 1997 – Peter Gilmour (AUS)
- 1998 – Andy Beadsworth (GBR)
- 1999 – Sten Mohr (DEN)
- 2000 – Dean Barker (NZL)
- 2001 – Dean Barker (NZL)
- 2002 – Philippe Presti (FRA)
- 2003 – Jesper Radich (DEN)
- 2004 – Bertrand Pacé (FRA)
- 2005 – Peter Gilmour (AUS)
- 2006 – Johnie Berntsson (SWE)
- 2007 – Paolo Cian (ITA)
- 2008 – Paolo Cian (ITA)
- 2009 – Roberto Ferrarese (ITA)
- 2010 – Mate Arapov (CRO)
- 2011 – Tomislav Bašić (CRO)
- 2012 – Tomislav Bašić (CRO)
