= Košljun (island) =

Island of Croatia

Coordinates: 45°1′36″N 14°37′6″E

Map

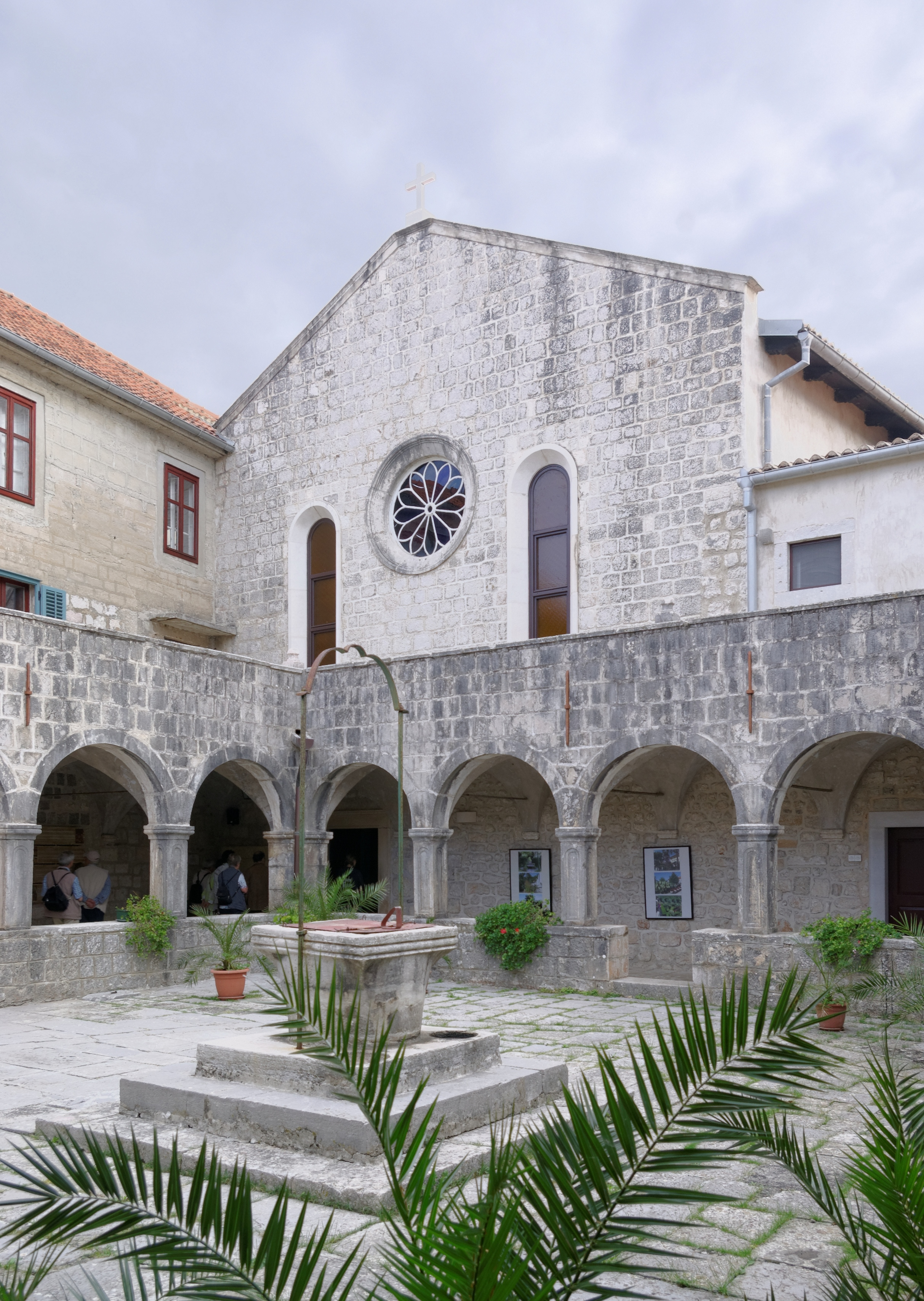
Košljun monastery

Košljun is a relatively small island in Puntarska Draga bay off the coast of Krk, facing Punat, in the Adriatic Sea, Croatia. It is approximately 300 meters in diameter and covers an area of 6.5 hectares and is rich in vegetation. The only inhabitants are a group of Franciscan friars living in St. Mary's Monastery.

== History ==
The earliest known settlement on Košljun was a Roman villa rustica belonging to a landowner of the Roman settlement on Curicum (Croatian: Krk). The next solid evidence of inhabitation is a written record from 1186 implying the existence of a Benedictine abbey built on its foundations. This was abandoned in 1447, and the Frankopans moved in Franciscans in their place. The present church was built by the Franciscans in 1480. The Benedictines remained on the island until the 15th century. After the death of the abbot Dominik, a Venetian priest held the title of Abbot of Košljun, and the island was abandoned.

A pair of Franciscan friars complained to the Pope that the monastery was sitting empty. At their request, the Benedictine monastery was abolished and the island of Košljun given to the Franciscans, whose monastery remains today.

== The collections ==
Near the jetty, one can find a statue of St. Francis with a wolf, a common iconographic motif for this saint. In addition to the statue, there is a text written in Glagolitic, located over the main entrance to the monastery, called, "Mir i Dobro" (peace and well-being), which is also dedicated to St. Francis. In the monastery, there is an ethnographic collection, including articles used by farmers and fishermen on Krk from the end of the 19th and the beginning of the 20th century.

There is also a permanent exhibition of church artifacts housed in the old Benedictine church from the 12th century. As well as old masters (G. da Santacroce, F. Ughetto, Medulić and E. Jurič), the collection also includes works by more recent Croatian artists and sculptors such as: Dulčić, Bulić, Radauš, Orlić and Kršinić. The monastery owns a rich library of some 15,000 books, which contains a Jewish Bible from the 11th century, Glagolitic sermons, and Ptolemy's Atlas, printed in Venice in 1511.

== Notes ==
- Košljun: Spirituality, Culture, Nature by Cedomir Miler, trans. Janet Tuškan.
