= Lavsa =

Island in Croatia

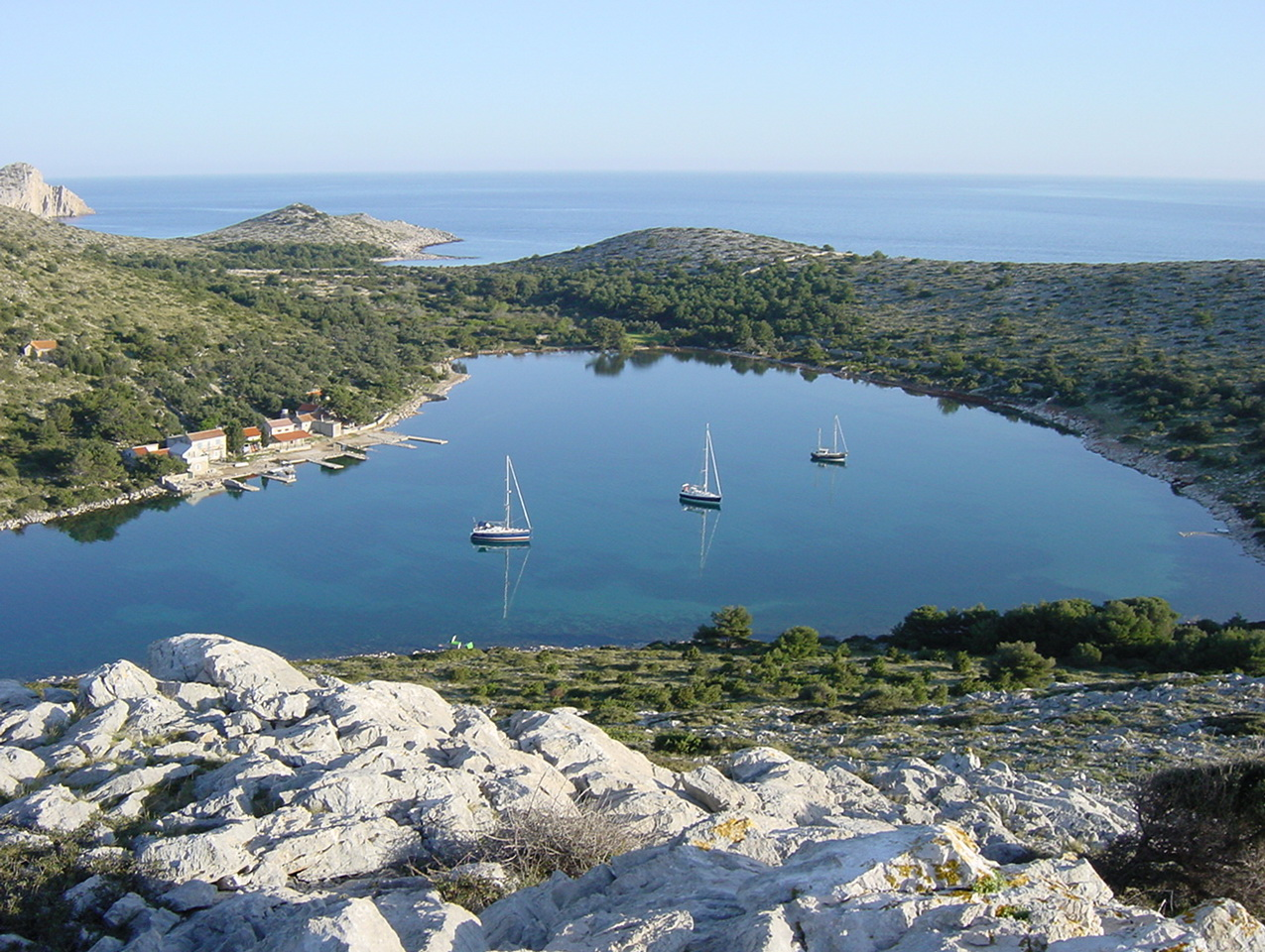
- Lavsa

- Location within Croatia
- Interactive map of Lavsa

Geography
- Location: Adriatic Sea
- Coordinates: 43°45′11″N 15°22′28″E
- Archipelago: Kornati Islands
- Area: 1.78 km^{2} (0.69 sq mi)
- Highest elevation: 111 m (364 ft)
- Highest point: Veli vrh

Administration
- Croatia
- County: Šibenik-Knin County

Demographics
- Population: 0

Lavsa is an uninhabited Croatian island in the Adriatic Sea located southwest of Kornat. Its area is 1.78 km^{2} (0.69 sq mi).

In the bay, there are several houses that are used summer only. Otherwise, the island is without inhabitants. The harbor is protected from all winds.

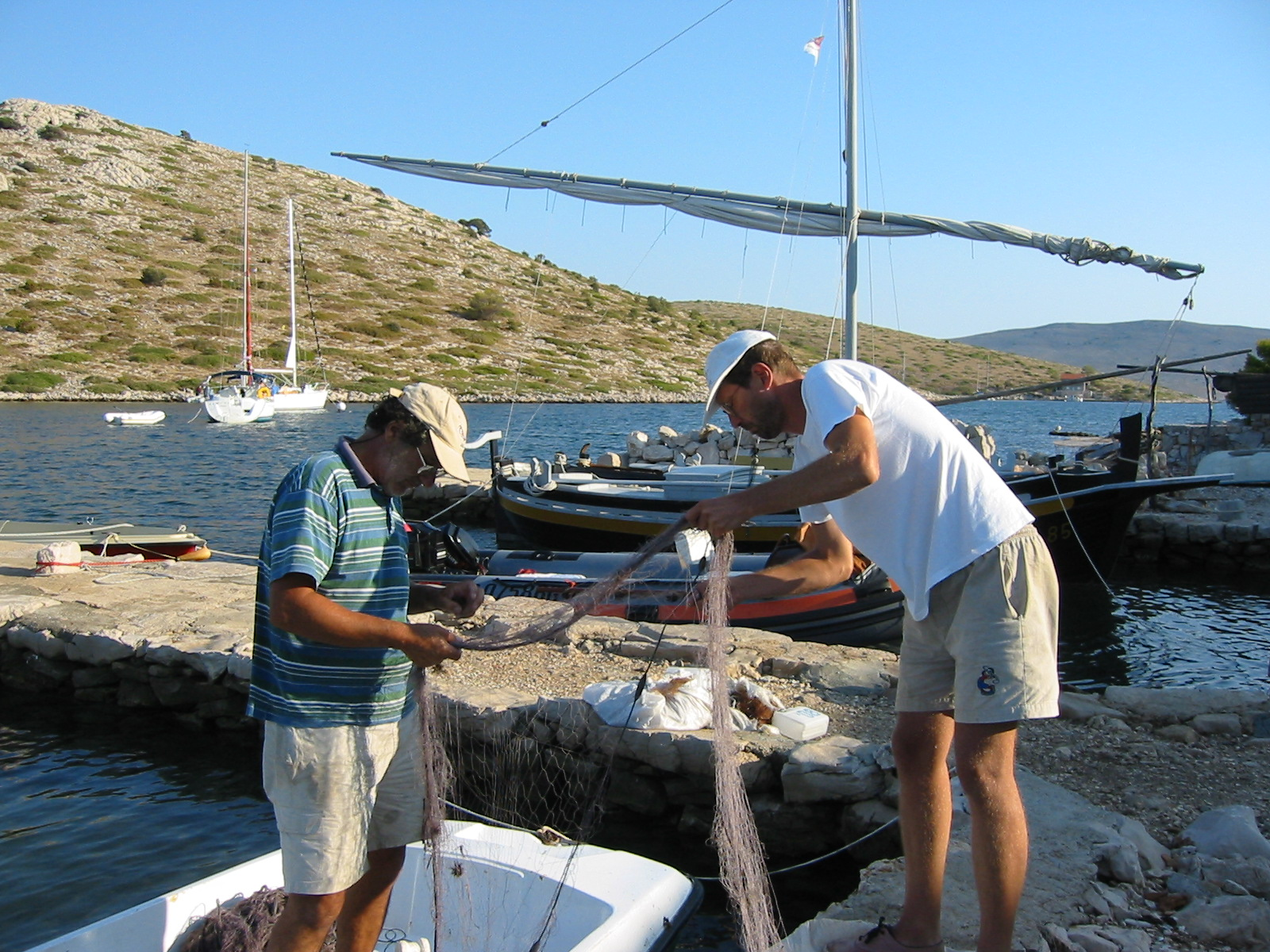
Fisherman in Lavsa
