= Katina (island) =

Island in Croatia

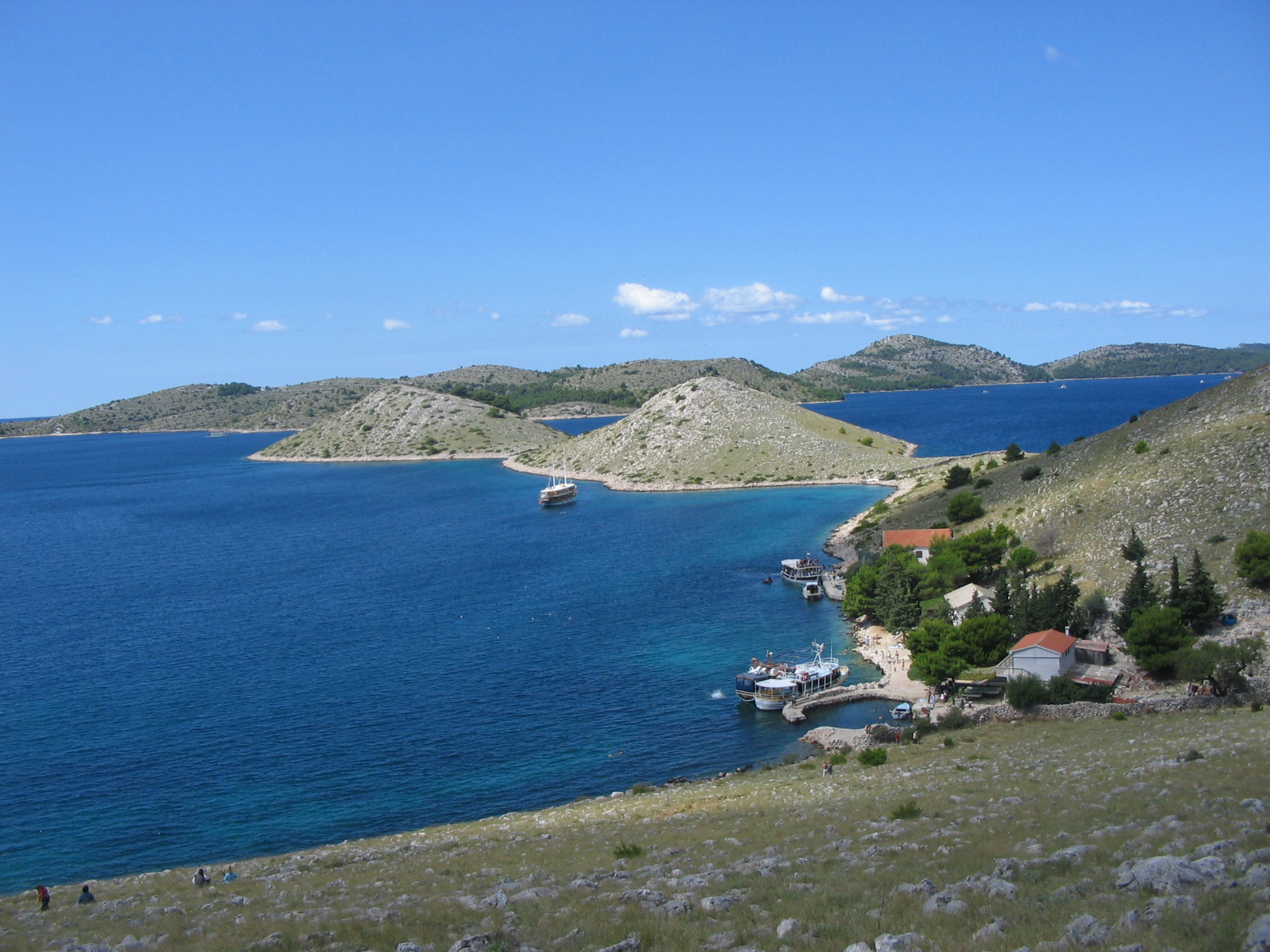
- Excursion boats and buffet on the south side of the island.

- Location within Croatia
- Interactive map of Katina

Geography
- Location: Adriatic Sea
- Coordinates: 43°52′53″N 15°13′13″E
- Area: 1.12 km^{2} (0.43 sq mi)

Administration
- Croatia
- County: Zadar County

Demographics
- Population: 0

Katina is a Croatian island in the Adriatic Sea located between Dugi Otok to the north and Kornat to the south, with an area of 1.17 km^{2} (0.45 sq mi).

Katina is separated from Dugi Otok by a 100 metres (330 ft) wide and barely 2 metres (6 ft 7 in) deep channel Mala Proversa. On the south side of the island is Vela Proversa channel, about 500 metres (1,600 ft) wide and suitable for navigation, which separates Katina from Kornat. It is a part of the nature park Telašćica.
