= Minefields in Croatia =

Overview of minefields stationed in Croatia

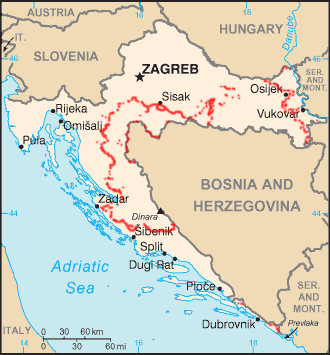
Approximate locations of suspected minefields in Croatia in 2006

Minefields in Croatia were fully cleared in 2026. Land mines were used extensively during the Croatian War of Independence by Serbs in the conflict, with about 1.5 million deployed. They were intended to strengthen defensive positions lacking sufficient weapons or manpower, but played a limited role in the fighting.

After the war, 13,000 square kilometres (5,000 square miles) of territory was initially suspected to contain mines. After physical inspection, this estimate was reduced to 1,174 square kilometres (453 square miles). As of 2013 demining programs were coordinated through governmental bodies such as the Croatian Mine Action Centre, which hired private demining companies employing 632 deminers. The areas were marked with 11,454 warning signs.

As of 4 April 2013, 509 people had been killed and 1,466 injured by land mines in Croatia since the war; with these figures including 60 deminers and seven Croatian Army engineers killed during demining operations. In the immediate aftermath of the war, there were about 100 civilian mine casualties per year, but this decreased to below ten per year by 2010 through demining, mine-awareness, and education programs.

During demining, economic loss to Croatia (due to loss of land use within suspected minefields) was estimated at €47.3 million per year. The final cost of demining is estimated at €1.2 billion.

== Background ==
JNA/RSK held areas in Croatia in January 1992

In 1990, following the electoral defeat of the Communist regime in Croatia by the Croatian Democratic Union (HDZ), ethnic tensions between Croats and Serbs worsened. After the elections, the Yugoslav People's Army (JNA) confiscated Croatia's Territorial Defence weapons to minimize potential resistance. On 17 August, tensions escalated to an open revolt by the Croatian Serbs. The JNA stepped in, preventing Croatian police from intervening. The revolt centred on the predominantly Serb-populated areas of the Dalmatian hinterland around the city of Knin, parts of the Lika, Kordun and Banovina regions and eastern Croatian settlements with a significant Serb population. This incontiguous area was subsequently named the Republic of Serbian Krajina (RSK). The RSK declared its intention to join Serbia, and as a result came to be viewed by the Government of Croatia as a breakaway region. By March 1991, the conflict had escalated into what became known as the Croatian War of Independence. In June, Croatia declared its independence as Yugoslavia disintegrated. By January 1992, the RSK held 17,028 square kilometres (6,575 sq mi) of territory within borders claimed by Croatia. This territory ranged from 2.5 to 63.1 kilometres (1.6 to 39.2 miles) in depth, and had a 923-kilometre (574 mi) front line along Croatian-controlled territory.

== Wartime use ==
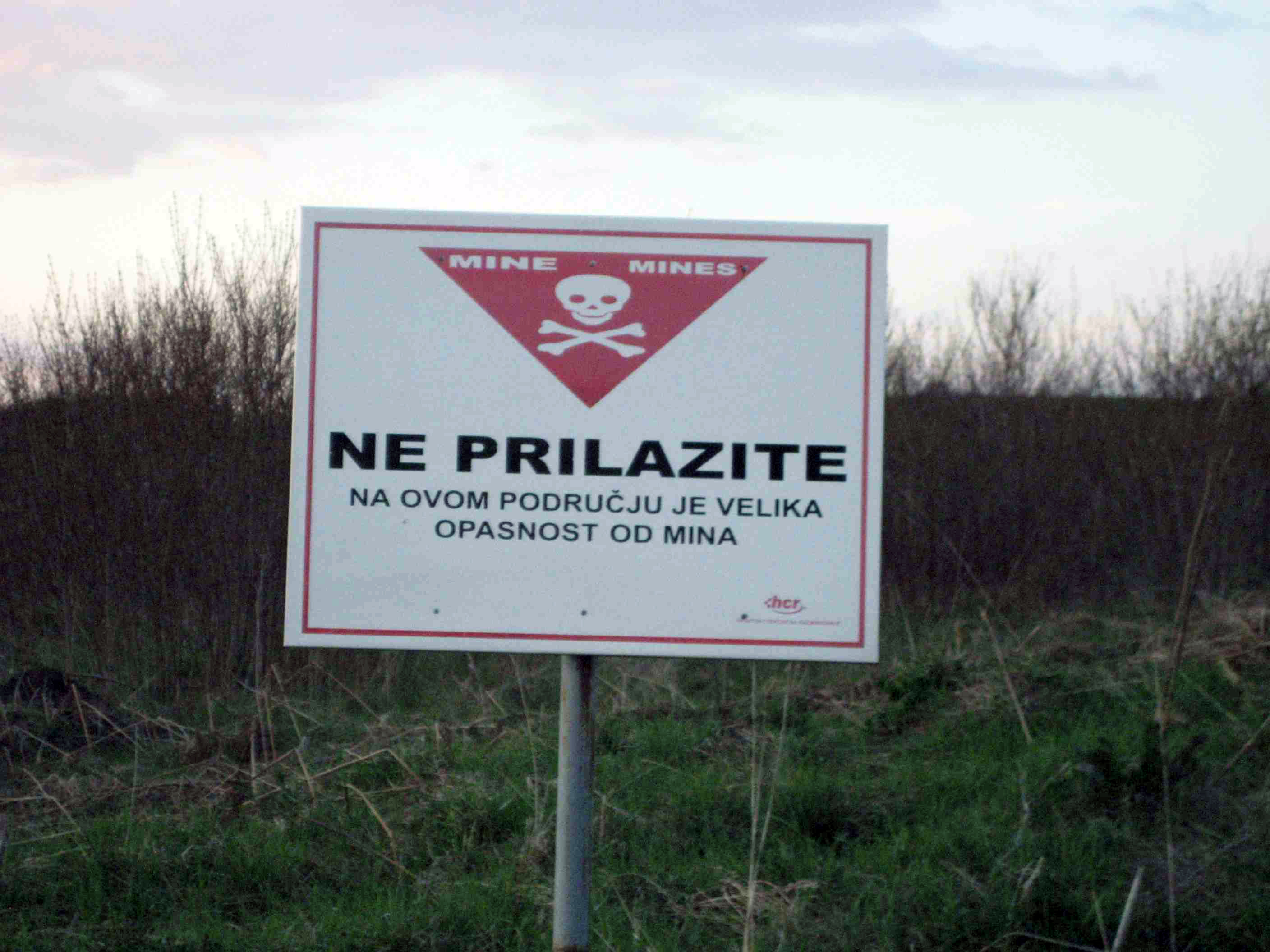
Marking of a minefield left over from Croatian War of Independence

Land mines were first used by the JNA in early 1991, before its withdrawal from Croatia, to protect military barracks and other facilities. Even JNA facilities located in urban centers were secured in this way, using mines such as the PROM-1 bounding mine and MRUD directional anti-personnel mine. The Croatian Army (HV) and Croatian police began laying land mines in late 1991, relying heavily on them to stop advances by the JNA and the Army of the RSK (ARSK) until early 1992. These early minefields were laid with little documentation. In 1992 the ARSK increased its use of mines to secure the front line, largely due to its limited number of troops. Consequently, the ARSK constructed static defensive lines (consisting of trenches, bunkers and large numbers of mines designed to protect thinly-manned defences) to delay HV offensives. This approach was necessitated by the limited depth of RSK territory and the lack of reserves available with which to counterattack (or block) breaches of its defensive line, which meant that the ARSK was unable to employ defence in depth tactics. The combination of poor documentation of minefield locations and the lack of markings (or fencing) led to frequent injuries to military personnel caused by mines laid by friendly forces. It is estimated that a total of 1.5 million land mines were laid during the war.

The HV successfully used anti-tank mines as obstacles in combination with infantry anti-tank weapons, destroying or disabling more than 300 JNA tanks (particularly during defensive operations in Slavonia). Conversely, anti-personnel mines deployed by the ARSK proved less effective against the HV during operations Flash and Storm in 1995. During these operations, the HV crossed (or bypassed) many ARSK minefields based on information from land-based and unmanned aerial vehicle reconnaissance of the movement of ARSK patrols, civilian populations, and the activation of mines by wildlife. Out of the 224 HV personnel killed in operations Flash and Storm, only 15 fatalities were caused by land mines. Similarly, out of 966 wounded in the two offensives only 92 were injured by land mines.

== Casualties ==
As of 4 April 2013 a total of 509 people had been killed and 1,466 injured by land mines in 1,352 incidents in Croatia. There were 557 civilian casualties from land mines between 1991 and 1995, during the war and in its immediate aftermath. Between 1996 and 1998 there were approximately 100 civilian casualties from land mines per year in Croatia, but the number gradually decreased to less than ten per year by 2010. During the war, 57 HV troops were killed or injured by mines in 1992. In 1995, 169 were killed or injured (most during operations Flash and Storm) out of 130,000 HV troops involved. Seven HV engineers were killed and 18 injured by land mines during HV mine clearance operations between 1996 and 1998. Civilian casualties include 60 deminers killed since 1998.

Croatia has established an extensive framework to assist those injured by mines and the families of mine victims. This assistance includes emergency and ongoing medical care, physical rehabilitation, psychological and social support, employment and social-integration assistance, public awareness, and access to public services. Institutions and organizations supporting mine victims include a wide range of governmental bodies and non-governmental organizations (NGOs).

== 2024 minefields ==
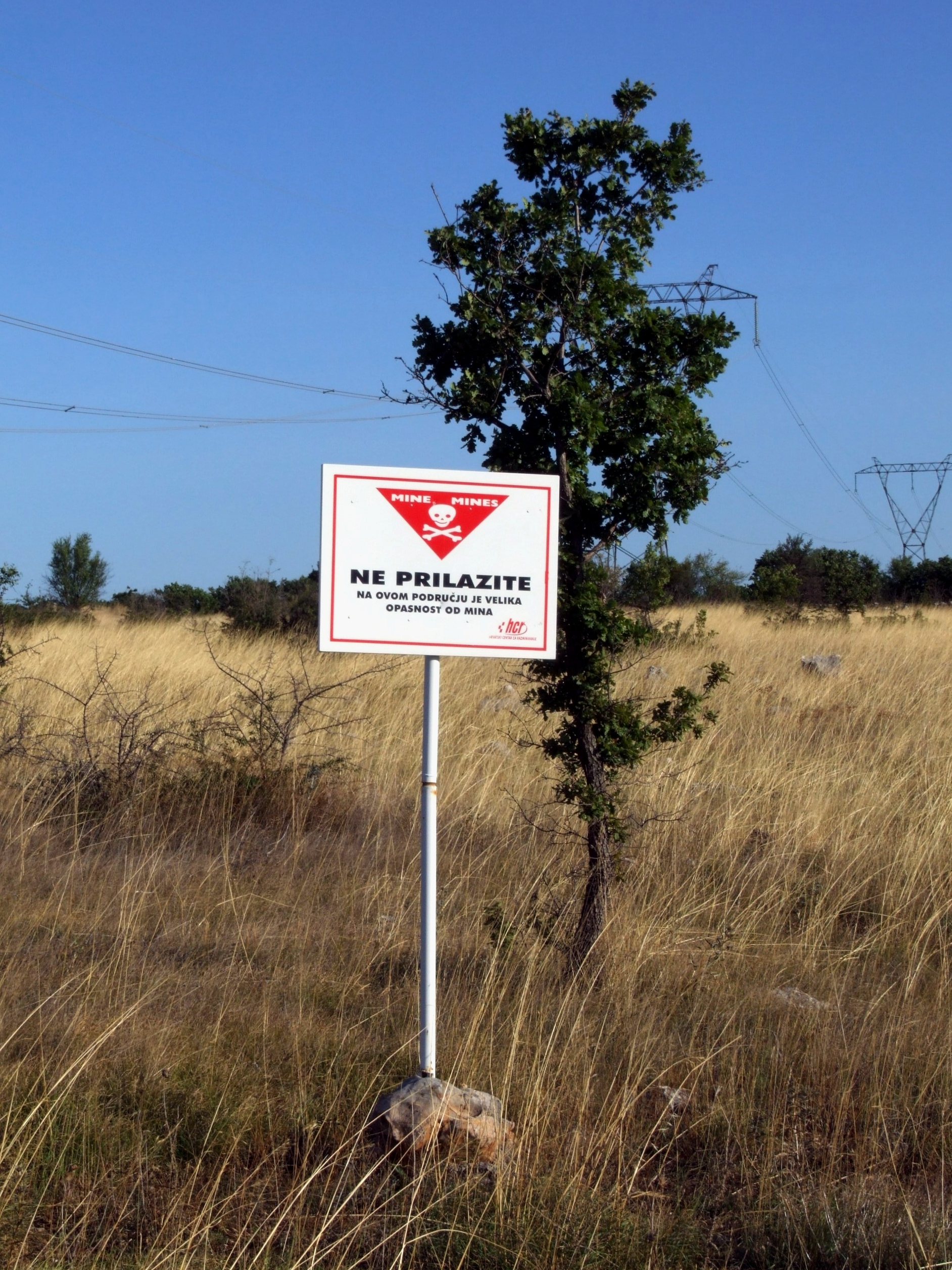
Standard minefield sign

As of 31 December 2024, Croatia reported 49.3 km^{2} of remaining civilian hazardous area (43.1 km^{2} confirmed hazardous area and 6.2 km^{2} suspected hazardous area), across 16 municipalities/towns in three counties. The estimated number of emplaced mines in civilian hazardous areas was 6,363 (5,624 antipersonnel mines and 739 antivehicle mines). The hazardous area was marked with 2,610 mine warning signs as of the same date.

Remaining hazardous area by county/municipality (31 Dec 2024)
County	Municipality/Town	Confirmed hazardous area (m²)	Suspected hazardous area (m²)	Total (m²)
Lika-Senj	Donji Lapac	5,214,924	2,673,974	7,888,898
Lika-Senj	Gospić	14,763,517	886,868	15,650,385
Lika-Senj	Lovinac	8,607	0	8,607
Lika-Senj	Otočac	5,405,154	1,260,585	6,665,739
Lika-Senj	Perušić	111	0	111
Lika-Senj	Plitvička Jezera	1,369,181	0	1,369,181
Lika-Senj	Udbina	338,509	678,716	1,017,225
Lika-Senj	Vrhovine	10,411,396	0	10,411,396
Split-Dalmatia	Hrvace	158,015	0	158,015
Split-Dalmatia	Vrlika	498,415	0	498,415
Sisak-Moslavina	Dvor	1,279,623	531,194	1,810,817
Sisak-Moslavina	Glina	541,326	15,639	556,965
Sisak-Moslavina	Gvozd	35,762	0	35,762
Sisak-Moslavina	Lipovljani	14,477	0	14,477
Sisak-Moslavina	Sunja	922,371	154,343	1,076,714
Sisak-Moslavina	Topusko	38,506	0	38,506
Total		43,133,281	6,201,721	49,335,002

== Social and economic impacts ==
Land mines are a safety issue for populations living near minefields. In 2008, an estimated 920,000 people in Croatia were endangered by their proximity to mined areas (20.8 percent of the population). Land mines are also a significant problem for development, because a substantial portion of the minefields in Croatia are on agricultural land and in forests. Some drainage channels are consequently inaccessible for maintenance, resulting in intermittent flooding; this is particularly severe in areas bordering Hungary. Similar problems are caused by mines laid on the banks of the Drava, Kupa, and Sava rivers. The presence of land mines adversely affected post-war recovery in rural areas, reducing the amount of available agricultural land, impeding development, and affecting the quality of life for people in mined areas. In addition to agriculture, the most significant economic problem caused by mines in Croatia is their impact on tourism (especially on forested areas and hunting in areas inland from the Adriatic Sea coast). In 2012, it was estimated that the economy of Croatia lost 355 million kuna (c. 47.3 million euros) a year from the effects of mine-suspected areas on the economy.

Because of the importance of tourism to the Croatian economy, areas frequented by tourists (or near major tourist routes) have been given priority for demining. Other safety-related areas receiving demining priority are settlements, commercial and industrial facilities and all documented minefields. Agricultural land, infrastructure, and forests are grouped in three priority categories depending on their economic significance. National parks in Croatia were also demined as top-priority areas, along with areas significant for fire protection. Theft of minefield signs is a significant problem, and is particularly pronounced in areas with concerns among the local population that the signs harm tourism. The signs are regularly replaced, sometimes with concrete or masonry structures to display them instead of metal poles. Since the 1990s, only one tourist has been injured by a land mine in Croatia.

The Government of Croatia established several bodies to address the problem of land mines in Croatia; foremost among them are the Office for Mine Action and the Croatian Mine Action Centre. The Office for Mine Action is a government agency tasked with providing expert analysis and advice on demining. The Croatian Mine Action Centre is a public-sector body tasked with planning and conducting demining surveys, accepting cleared areas, marking mine-suspected areas, quality assurance, demining research and development, and victim assistance. The work of the Croatian Mine Action Centre is supervised by the Office for Mine Action.

== Mine awareness and education ==
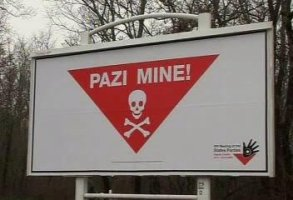
Mine-awareness billboard

Croatia has implemented a mine-awareness educational program aimed at reducing the frequency of mine-related accidents through an ongoing information campaign. The program is conducted by the Croatian Red Cross, the Ministry of Science, Education and Sports and several NGOs in cooperation with the Croatian Mine Action Centre. The Croatian Mine Action Centre actively supports NGOs to develop as many programs as possible and attract new NGOs to mine-awareness and educational activities. It maintains an accessible online database with cartographic information on the location of mine-suspected areas in Croatia.

One mine-awareness campaign involving billboard advertising attracted criticism from the Ministry of Tourism and the Croatian National Tourist Board (CNTB) because the signs were placed in tourist areas, far from any mine-suspected areas. The Ministry of Tourism and the CNTB welcomed the effort's humanitarian aspect, but considered the signs a potential source of unwarranted negative reaction from tourists. Tourist guidebooks of Croatia include warnings about the danger posed by mines in the country, and provide general information about their location.

== Demining ==
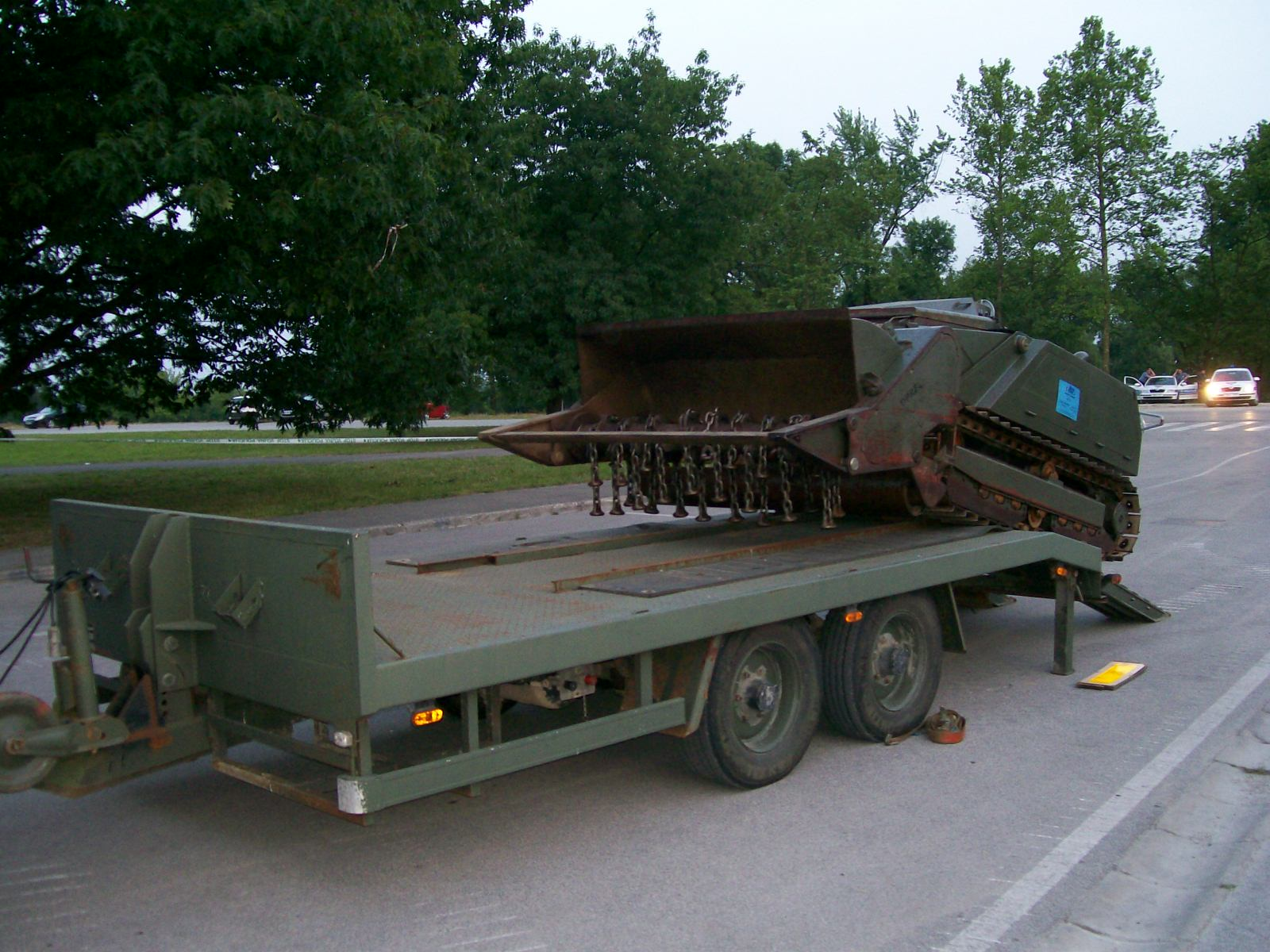
Mine flail used for demining in Croatia

At the end of the Croatian War of Independence, approximately 13,000 square kilometres (5,000 square miles) of the country was suspected of containing land mines. During the war and in its immediate aftermath, demining was performed by HV engineers supported by police and civil defence personnel. Wartime demining was focused on clearance tasks in support of military operations and the safety of the civilian population. In 1996 the Parliament of Croatia enacted the Demining Act, tasking police with its organization and the government-owned AKD Mungos company with the demining itself. By April 1998 approximately 40 square kilometres (15 square miles) had been cleared of mines, and the initial estimate of minefield areas was reduced after inspection. By 2003 the entire territory of Croatia was reviewed, and the minefield area was reduced to 1,174 square kilometres (453 square miles).

Since May 1998 the Croatian Mine Action Centre has been tasked with the development of demining plans, projects, technical inspections, cleared-area handover, demining quality assurance, expert assistance and the coordination of mine-clearance activities. The demining is performed by 35 licensed companies, employing 632 demining professionals and 58 auxiliary personnel. The companies do their work with 681 metal detectors, 55 mine rollers and mine flails, and 15 mine-detection dogs. Mine-clearing machines include locally designed models produced by DOK-ING. Deminers typically earn €.50–1.20 for each 1 square metre (11 square feet) cleared, or €800–900 a month.

Since 1998, demining has been funded through the government and by donations. From 1998 to 2011, donations amounted to €75.5 million (17 percent of the total of €450 million spent on demining during that period). Most donations were from foreign contributors, including NGOs and foreign governments (among them Japan, Germany, Monaco, Luxembourg and the United States). The European Union was also a significant contributor during that period, providing €20.7 million. As of 2013, the Croatian Mine Action Centre has been allocated approximately 400 million kuna (c. 53 million euros) a year for demining. In 2011, an estimated further €500 million (or more) was needed to remove all remaining land mines from Croatia by 2019, the deadline for land-mine clearance set by the Ottawa Treaty. The Croatian Mine Action Centre spends approximately 500,000 kuna (c. 66,600 euros) a year to maintain minefield warning signs (including the replacement of stolen signs).

As of April 2017, approximately 446 km² containing around 43,000 potential landmines was yet to be cleared.

On July 28, 2022, the Croatian government submitted to the Parliament the Proposal for the National Mine Action Program until 2026, which defines the demining strategy for mine-suspected areas and the deadline for completion by county.

In February 2026, the country was declared free of mines. A total of 107,000 mines were removed.
