= Kaprije =

Island of Croatia

Coordinates: 43.697479°N 15.700407°E

Location of island Kaprije on the map of Croatia.
Map

Kaprije is an island in the Croatian part of the Adriatic Sea, situated in the Šibenik archipelago. The island has area of 7.11 km^{2} (2.75 sq mi) and is composed of hills divided by transverse and longitudinal valleys where grass and sparse pine forests grow. Grapes and olives are cultivated there. The main industries are agriculture, fishing and tourism. Automobiles are not allowed on the island.

In 14th and 15th century the island belonged to noble families from Šibenik. During Ottoman conquests in 16th and 17th century, the island was inhabited by refugees from mainland. Around that time, a Saint Peter's church was built on the island.

Its population of 189 lives in the eponymous single settlement of Kaprije, which is part of the City of Šibenik.

== Demographics ==
Kaprije: Population trends 1857–2021
v

population	166		318	360	485	605	710	560	659	588	488	310	172	130	143	189	186
	1857	1869	1880	1890	1900	1910	1921	1931	1948	1953	1961	1971	1981	1991	2001	2011	2021

Sources:Croatian Bureau of Statistics publications
