= Sit (island) =

Island in Croatia

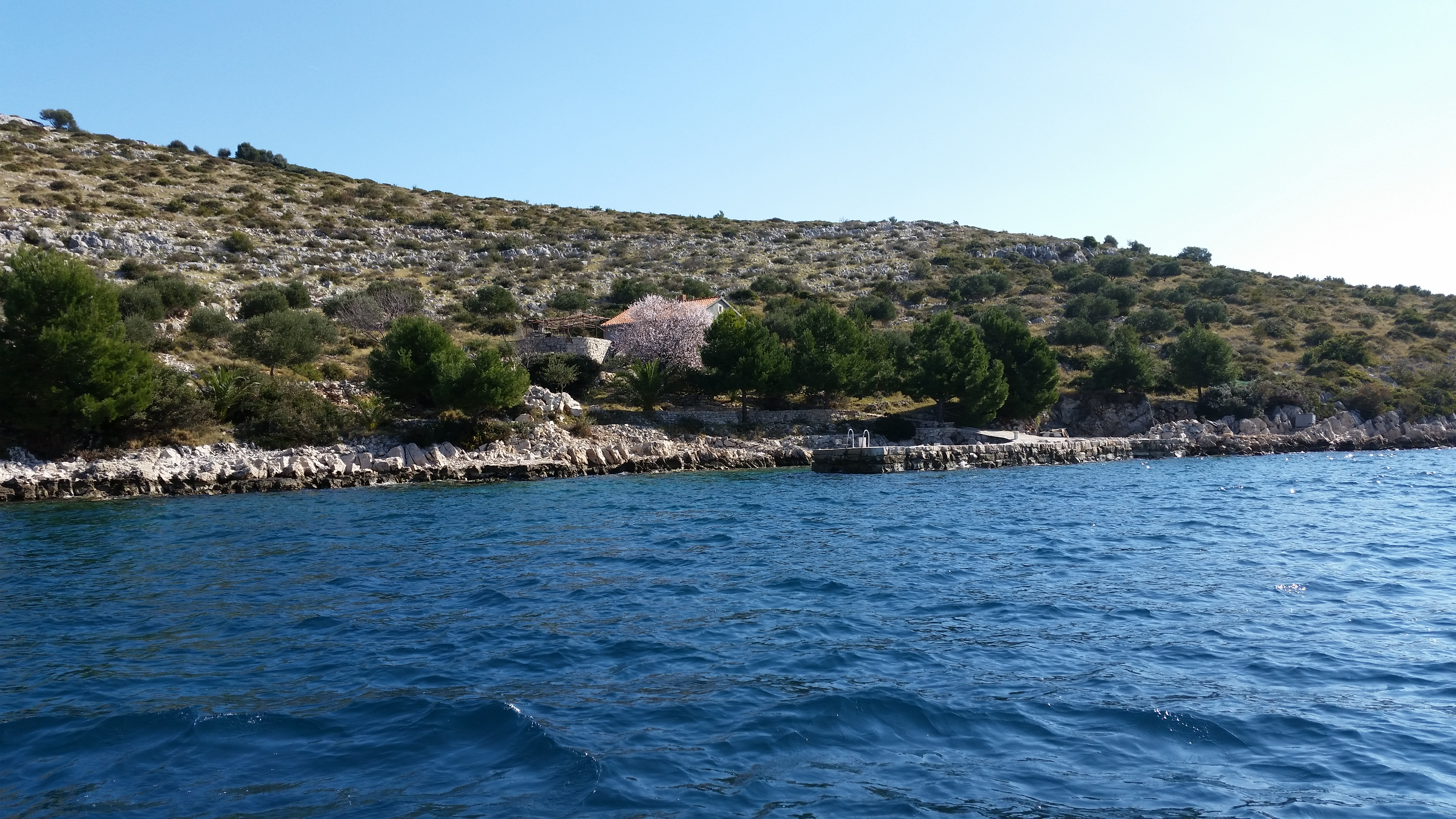
- Sit island

- Location within Croatia
- Interactive map of Sit

Geography
- Location: Adriatic Sea
- Coordinates: 43°55′53″N 15°17′50″E
- Archipelago: Kornati Islands
- Area: 1.77 km^{2} (0.68 sq mi)
- Highest elevation: 84 m (276 ft)
- Highest point: Veli vrh

Administration
- Croatia
- County: Šibenik-Knin County

Demographics
- Population: 0

Sit is an uninhabited Croatian island in the Adriatic Sea located between Žut and Pašman. Its area is 1.77 km^{2} (0.68 sq mi).

The coastline is not significantly indented, except for the bay Pahaljica (Čitapićev port) to the north of the island. Its middle width of 500 m consists of only one mountain ridge, where the highest elevation Veli vrh (84 m.a.s.l.) is located in the eastern part of the island, the central hill Vlašić is 78 m.a.s.l., and the northwest end Borovac is 60 m.a.s.l.

== Sources ==
- Filipi, Amos Rube (December 2003). "Povijesno-geografska obilježja Žutsko-sitske otočne skupine" [Historical-Geographical Features of the Žut-Sit Island Group, Croatia] (PDF). Geoadria (in Croatian). 8 (2): 87–130. doi:10.15291/geoadria.103.
