= Kornat =

Island of Croatia

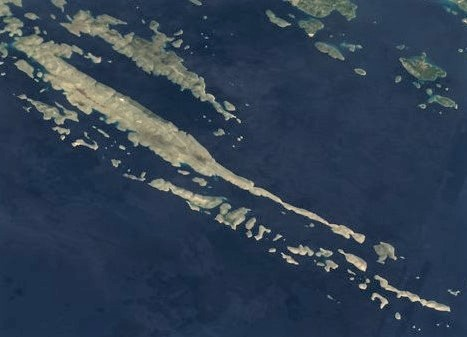
- Satellite image of Kornati

Geography
- Location: Adriatic Sea
- Coordinates: 43°48′10″N 15°20′00″E
- Archipelago: Kornati islands
- Area: 32.44 km^{2} (12.53 sq mi)
- Highest elevation: 207 m (679 ft)

Administration
- Croatia
- County: Šibenik-Knin County

Demographics
- Population: 19 (2011)
- Pop. density: 0.58/km^{2} (1.5/sq mi)

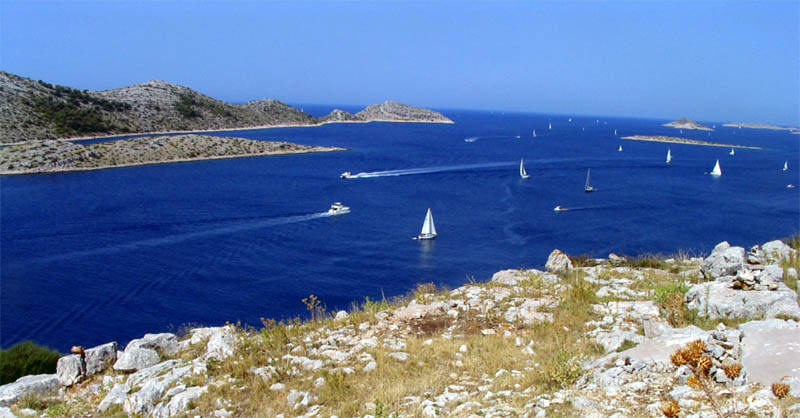

Kornat (pronounced [kɔ̌rnaːt]) is an island in the Croatian part of the Adriatic Sea, in central Dalmatia. With an area of 32.44 km^{2} it is the 16th largest island in Croatia and the largest island in the eponymous Kornati islands archipelago. It is part of the Kornati National Park, which is composed of a total of 89 islands, islets and rocks.

In the 19th century, the island was alternatively known as Insel Incoronata (in German) and Krunarski Otok (in Croatian).

According to the 2001 census, the island had a total population of 7, although there are no permanent settlements on the island. Kornati's coastline is 68.79 kilometres (42.74 mi) long.

In recent history, the island became infamous as the site of what became known as the "Kornat Tragedy" (Croatian: Kornatska tragedija), when a group of firefighters flown in as part of the 2007 coastal fires firefighting effort perished. Twelve out of thirteen men who found themselves surrounded by fire were killed in the event, which was the biggest loss of lives in the history of Croatian firefighting.

== See also ==
- Kornati Islands
- List of islands of Croatia
