= Kornati =

Kornati Islands National Park
- Nacionalni park Kornati (Croatian)
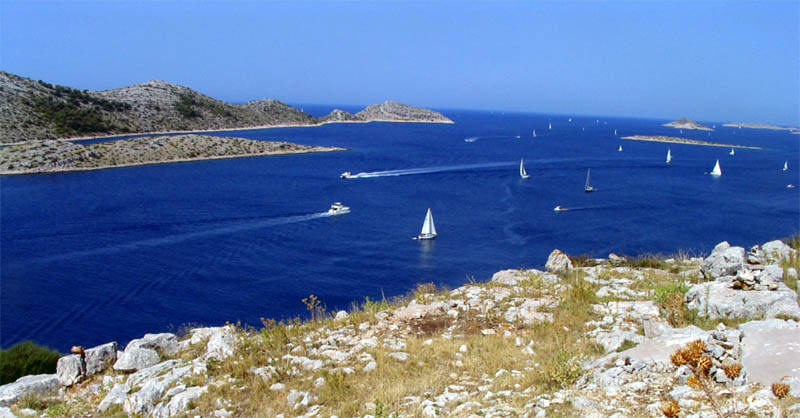
- The Kornati Islands

- Location within Croatia
- 43°47′N 15°20′E
- Location: Croatia; Šibenik-Knin County

Site notes
- Area: 320 km^{2} (120 sq mi)

Protected Natural Value of Croatia
- Official name: Nacionalni park Kornati
- Total Islands: 140
- Major Islands: Kornat, Lavsa, Žut

The Kornati archipelago (pronounced [kɔ̝rnǎːti]) of Croatia, also known as the Stomorski islands, is located in the northern part of Dalmatia, south from Zadar and west from Šibenik, in the Šibenik-Knin County. With 35 kilometres (22 miles) length and 89 islands, some large, some small, in a sea area of about 320 square kilometres (124 sq mi), the Kornati are the densest archipelago in the Mediterranean Sea. From northwest to southeast (from the island of Balabra to Samograd), and from northeast to southwest (from Gangarol to Mana) they stretch for 13 km (8 miles). The name of the archipelago is the plural form of the name of the largest island, called Kornat.

== Settlement ==
There are no permanent settlements in Kornati. Simple houses in well-protected coves such as Vrulje, Kravjačica, Lavsa and others are used by mainland landowners as temporary shelters. Most of the land owners are from the island of Murter and Dugi Otok.

== Climate ==
The average monthly temperature for January is 7.3 °C (45.1 °F), in July it is 23.9 °C (75.0 °F); the average sea temperature in winter is 14 to 15 °C (57 to 59 °F) and in summer 22.8 °C (73.0 °F).

== Geography ==
Geographically the Kornati islands can be divided into two main groups - the Gornji Kornati or Upper Kornati, closer to the mainland, and the Donji Kornati or Lower Kornati, which are mostly facing the open sea in the southwest.

The islands known as Gornji Kornati include the northernmost island of Sit and the surrounding islets, divided by a channel from Žut and its surrounding islets to the south. Žut is the largest and most indented of these islands.

== National park ==
In 1980, the 89 southernmost of the 140-odd islands, islets and reefs of the Kornati archipelago were declared a national park, Nacionalni Park Kornati, protecting the islands and their marine surroundings. The area covered by the national park mostly coincides with the Donji Kornati, which includes the island of Kornat and the surrounding islets, separated with a channel from the island of Piškera and the surrounding islets.

The national park includes 109 islands, of which 76 are less than 1 hectare in size. Of the total land surface area of Kornati, 62 km^{2} (24 sq mi), or 85%, is stony, and only 5% has been cultivated.

The most important places on the Kornati islands are: the shallow channel Mala Proversa, the oval-shaped Taljurič island, Špinuta Bay, Stivina Bay, the fourth largest island Levrnaka, the second largest karst rock-area Tarac, Svršata Vela island, Mana island, Piškera island, Panitula Vela island, the picturesque Lavsa Bay, the resort island Ravni Žakan, Smokvica Vela island, the Opat peninsula, Samograd island, the Purara reserve for marine life, Vrgada and Gangarol islands.

The names of the islands Babina Guzica and Kurba Vela, which in Croatian refer to buttocks and prostitution, offer an opportunity to explain the many vulgar names officially given to many places in the Kornati archipelago. When Austrian surveyors came to record the archipelago at the end of the 19th century, their local guides mocked them by making up vulgar names for the various locations.

Kornat, the biggest of the islands with a total area of 32.44 square kilometres (12.53 mi^{2}), comprises two-thirds of the park's land area. Although the island is 25.2 kilometres (15.7 mi) long, it is no wider than 2.5 km (2 mi). The park is managed from the town of Murter, on the island of the same name, which is connected to the mainland by a drawbridge in the town of Tisno.

== Geology ==
Most of the terrain in the Kornati islands is karst-limestone which, in the distant geological past, arose from sediment from the sea. In the stone on the islands there are numerous fossils of crustaceans and fish. In the area there examples of all the typical forms of karst: bizarre shapes formed by the atmosphere, unexplored caves, areas of flat rock and, above all, cliffs. Karst rock is porous, rapidly draining and dry, and so therefore are the Kornati islands. Numerous cisterns supply water for people and animals.

Human presence on the Kornati islands appear to extend back to the Neolithic Age, and the remains of Illyrian settlements were found on the island of Kornat. The presence of wealthy Romans is attested by the mosaic floors of Roman villas, and Kornat island has a small tower, Toreta, that was probably built in the 6th century AD. The island of Piškera was also inhabited during the Middle Ages and served as a storage point for fish. Archeological sites in Stražišče and Tarac, and on Levrnaka and Lavsa provide evidence that during the Roman era life on Kornati was very active. There are many buildings and it is known that there were also stone quarries.

During the long period of Venetian occupation, the islands were used for resupplying the Venetian fleet. Deforestation and subsequent erosion, and overgrazing by sheep and goats, for whose benefit the scrub was periodically burnt over, impoverished the fauna and depopulated the islands, which were purchased by citizens of Murter during the late 19th century.

== Fauna ==
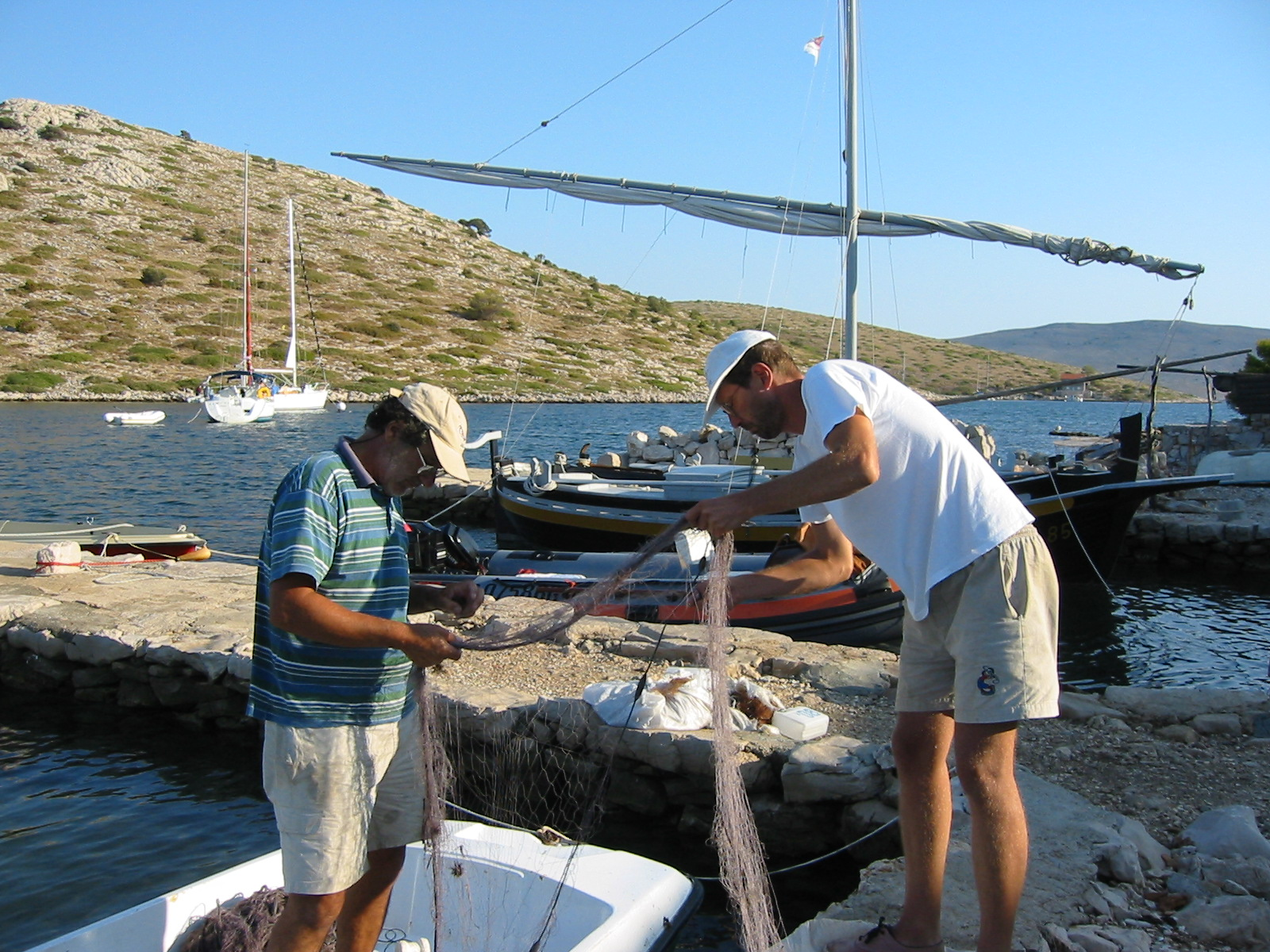
Fishermen in Lavsa

Apart from sea-gulls, which are the most numerous animals, there are some lizards and ring-snakes, and 69 varieties of butterfly, some amphibians and rodents. The local ichthyological fauna is also sparse. As regards marine life, the Kornati islands are typical of the Adriatic and the Mediterranean, but, due to the underwater relief, streams and special characteristics of the sea in this labyrinth, there are also some peculiarities: algae, coral and sponges. At one time the sea was the richest in the Adriatic for sponge hunters. The rare mollusc Pinna nobilis lives in the Kornati and is protected by law.

Not only the land but also the sea is within the protection of the National Park. Fishing is extremely limited in order to allow the regeneration of fish shoals that had been severely over-fished. According to tradition, the Mediterranean monk seal (Monachus albiventur) once lived among these islands. The name of the southernmost point on Vela Kurka (Mendo) is connected with this almost extinct species.

== Flora ==
Vegetation on the islands is very sparse maquis. There have been 200 known varieties of Mediterranean plants, but they have degenerated. The most common plant is a tough variety of grass, but there are many scented and medicinal herbs: sage, feather grass and Xeranthemum, giving a fragrant spring, and during the year providing the best forage for bees. Olive trees account for about 80% of the land under cultivation, followed by vineyards, figs, orchards and vegetable gardens. It is thought that the Kornati islands were once covered with forests of Mediterranean holm oaks, Quercus ilex, but as open fires demanded a great deal of wood, the forests were slowly destroyed; the sole remnant is round the bay of Telašćica.

== See also ==
- Prvić
- Tentative list of World Heritage Sites in Croatia
- List of protected areas of Croatia
