= List of inhabited islands of Croatia =

List of islands

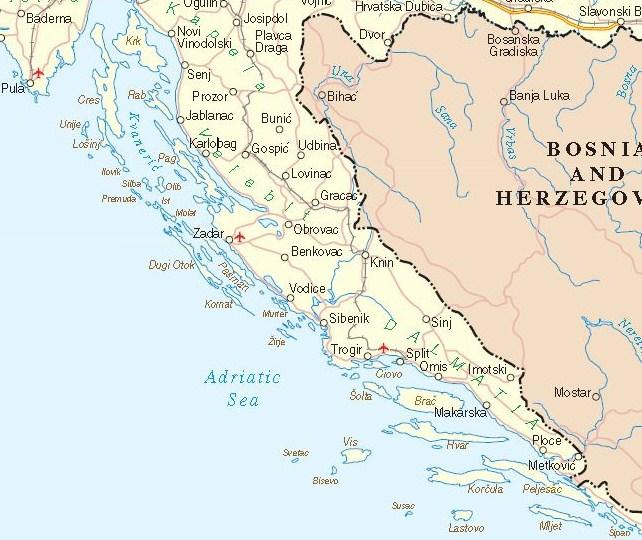
Map of the Croatian islands in the Adriatic Sea

In the Croatian part of the Adriatic Sea, there are 718 islands, 389 islets and 78 reefs, making the Croatian archipelago the largest in the Adriatic Sea and the second largest in the Mediterranean Sea, after the Greek archipelago.

Of the 718 islands, only 47 are inhabited in the sense that at least one person resides on that island. Some sources indicate that Croatia has 67 inhabited islands, counting those that have a settlement, but 20 of those have lost all of their permanent population as a result of the population decline occurring throughout the Croatian islands due to insufficient economic activity.

The Adriatic islands have been populated at least since the time of Ancient Greece. For example, Hvar was already populated between 3500 BC and 2500 BC and Dionysius I of Syracuse founded a colony on Hvar and Vis in the 4th century BC. The combined island population reached its peak in 1921, at 173,503 inhabitants, and went into steady decline in the following decades, dropping to pre-1850s level by 1981. The depopulation trend was reversed only in the 1990s, with the 2001 census registering a population of 122,418, up from 110,953 in 1991.

The main industries on the islands are agriculture, fishing and tourism. The islands' agriculture is primarily devoted to viticulture and olive growing. The local economy is relatively underdeveloped while the cost of living is 10 to 30% higher than on the mainland, so the Croatian government provides various kinds of support and protection through its Islands Act (Croatian: Zakon o otocima) to stimulate the economy of the islands, including charging no tolls on bridges, and providing discounted or free ferry tickets for islanders.

== Islands ==
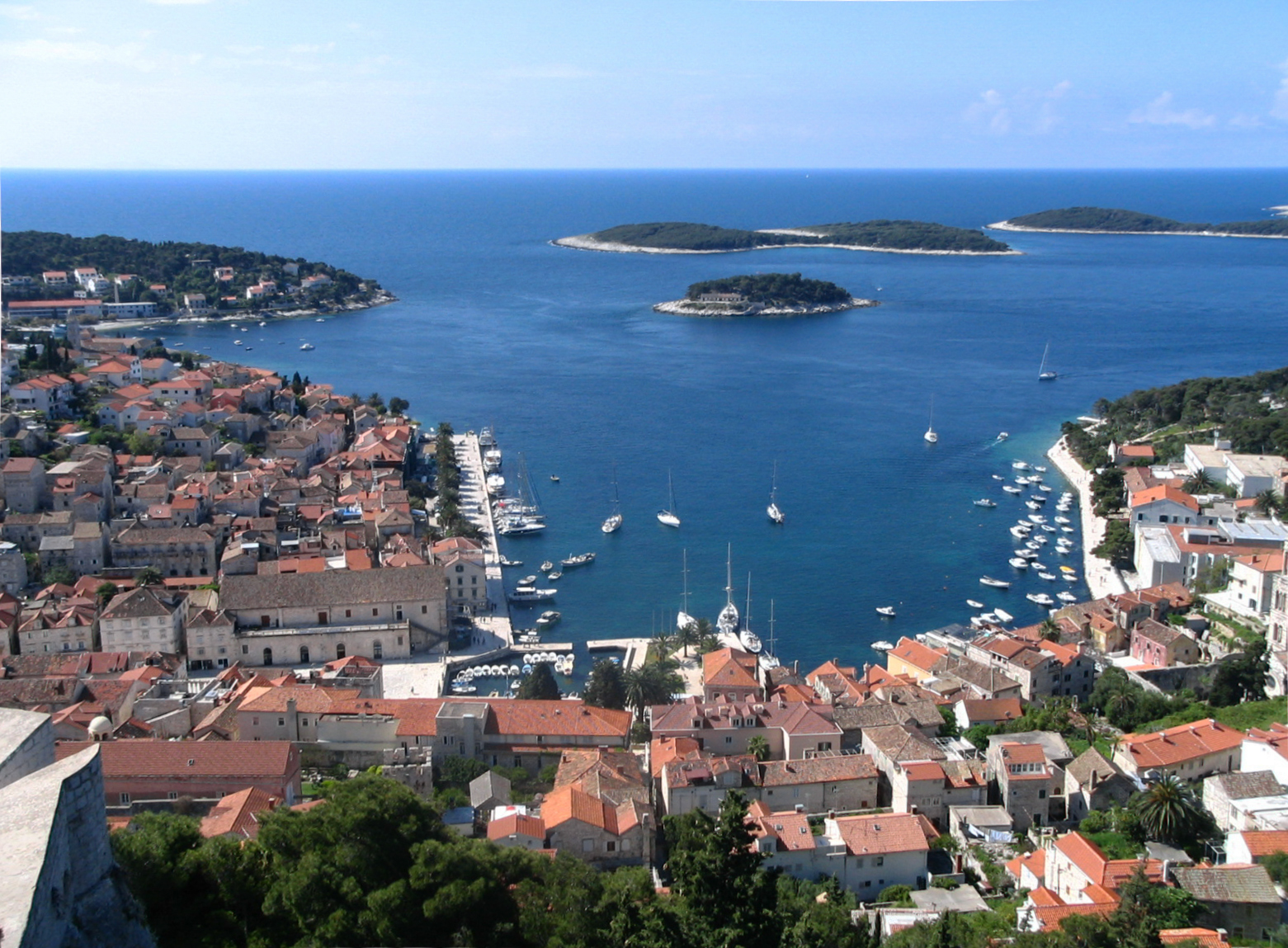
The harbour of Hvar town, on the island of Hvar

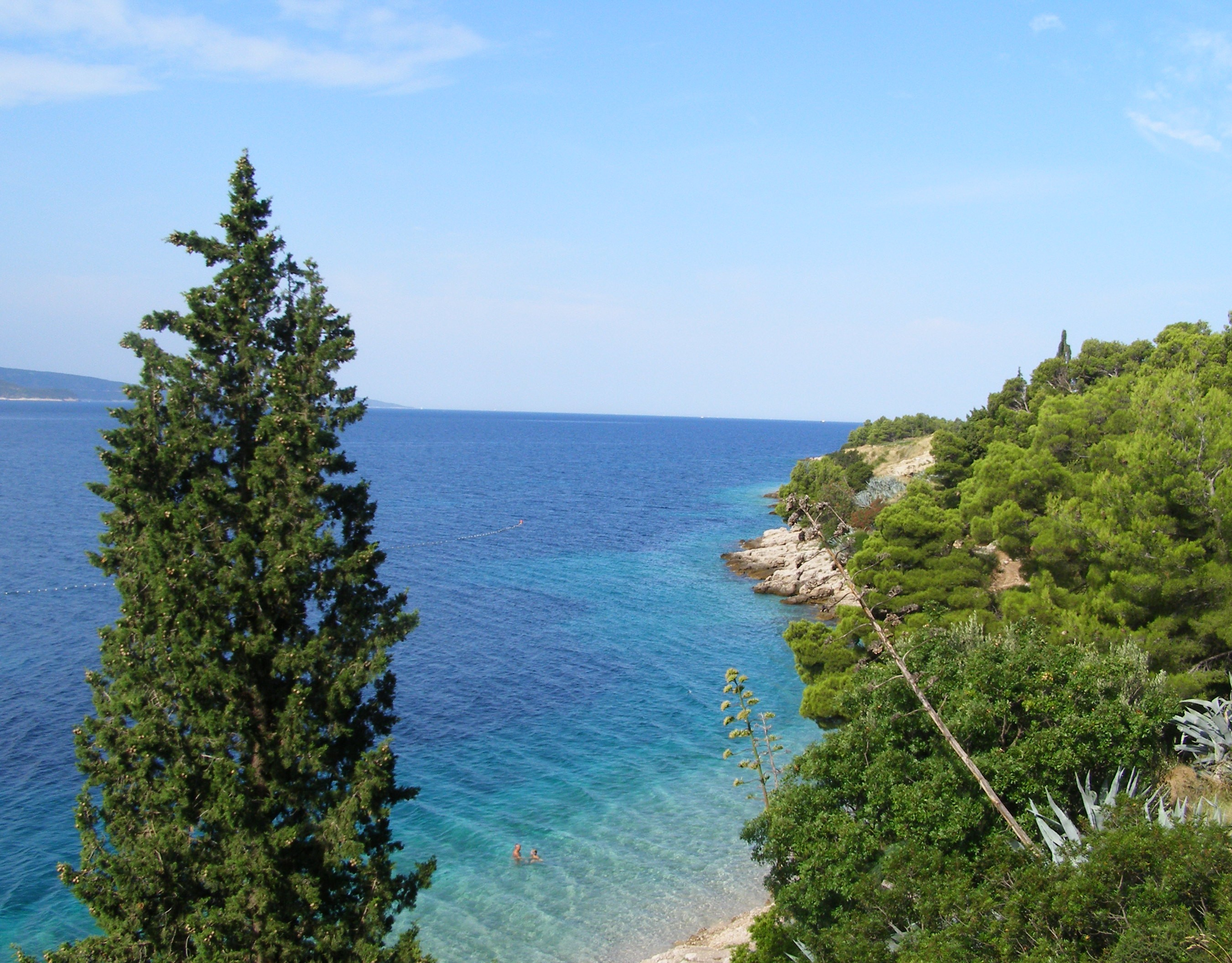
A shoreline of the island of Brač

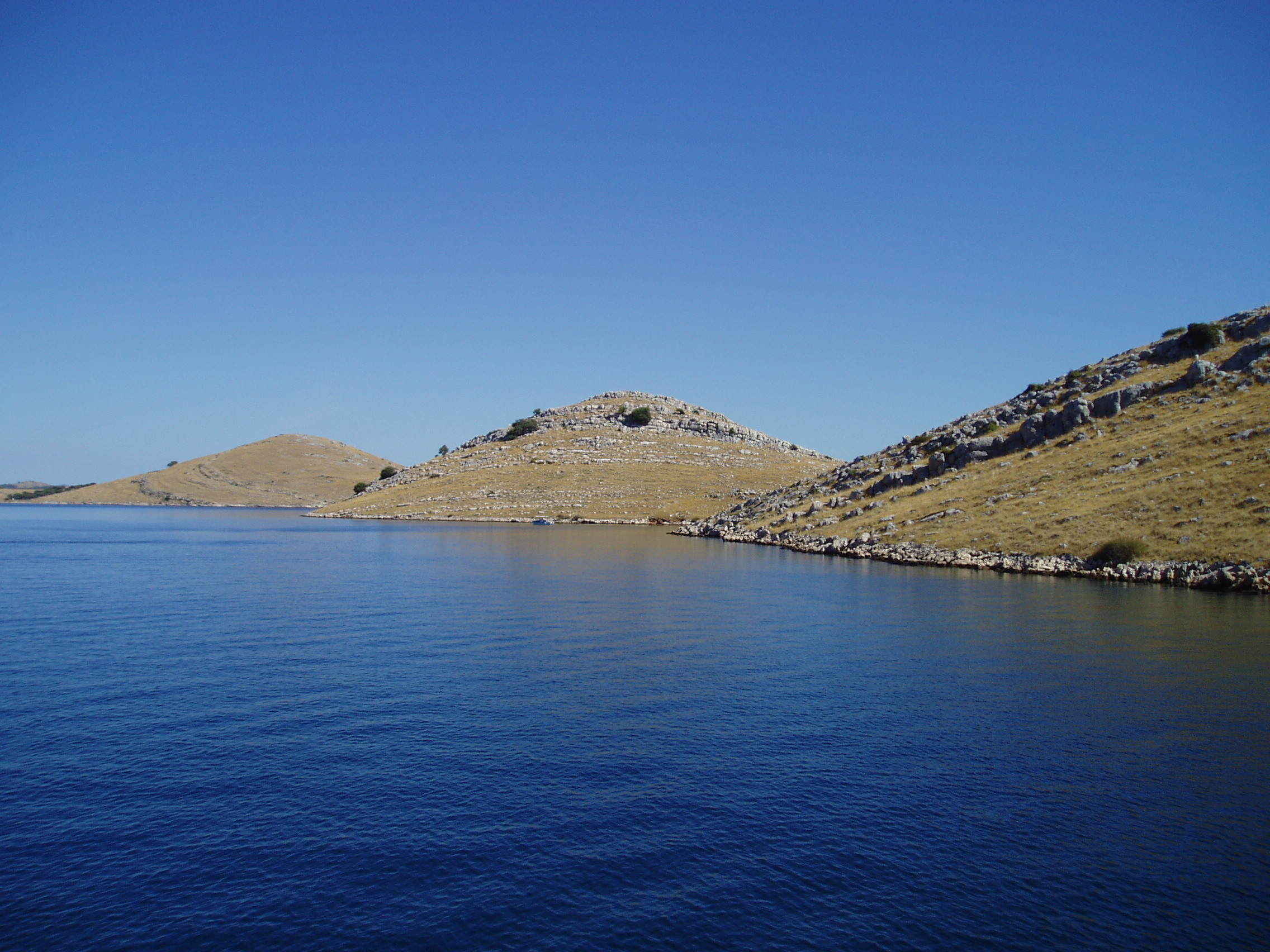
The Kornati archipelago

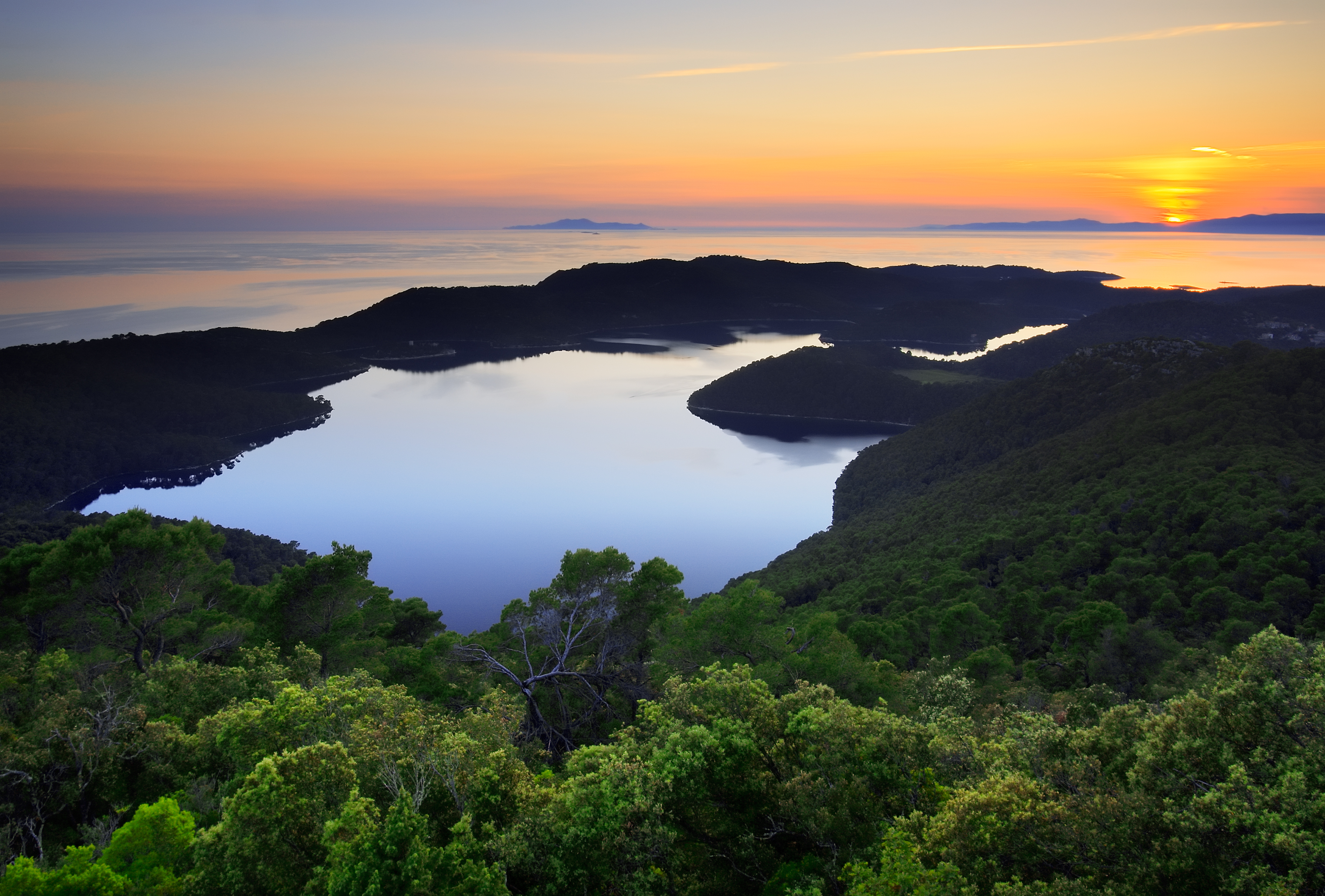
A forest and lake on the island of Mljet

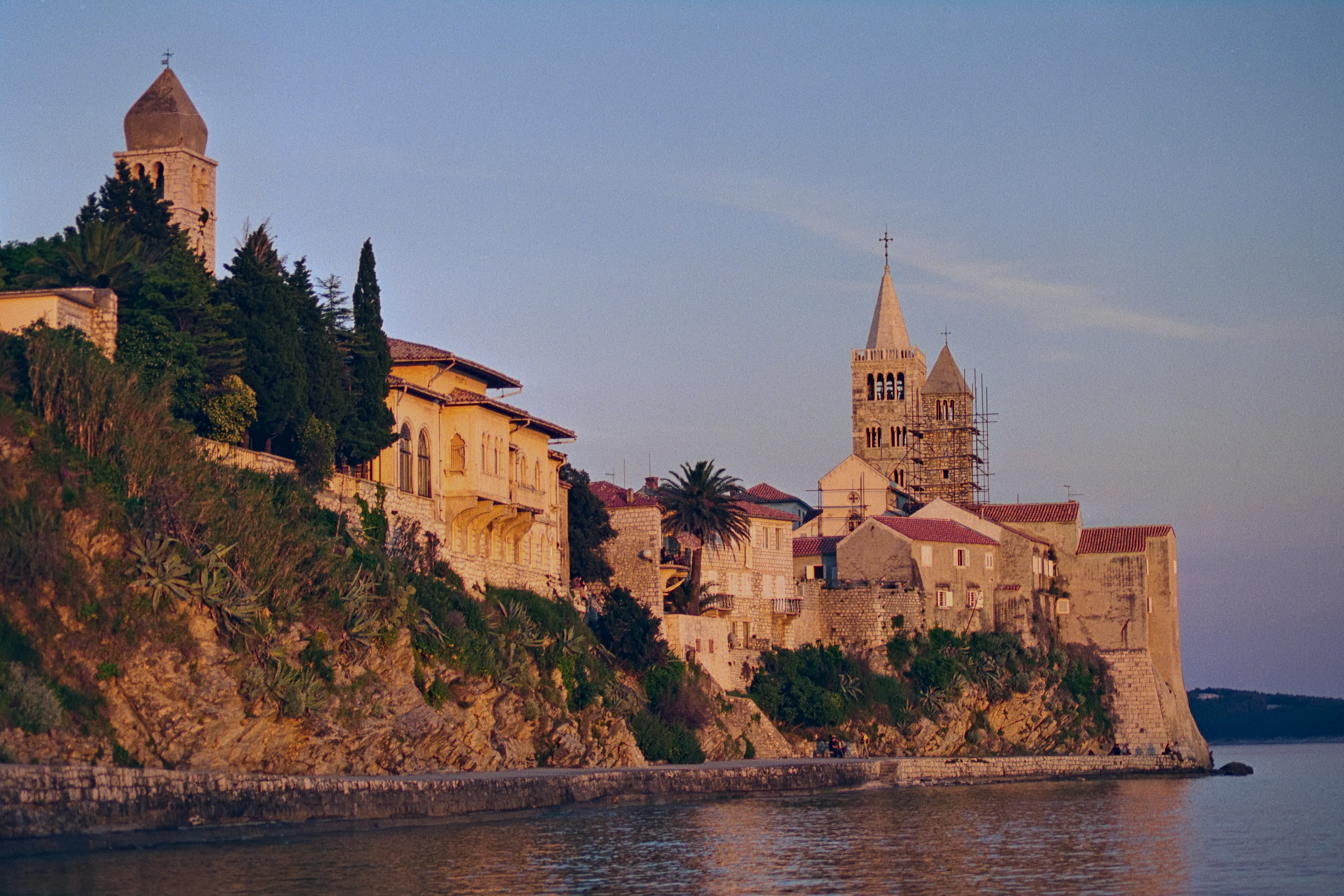
Historic town center of Rab, on the island of Rab

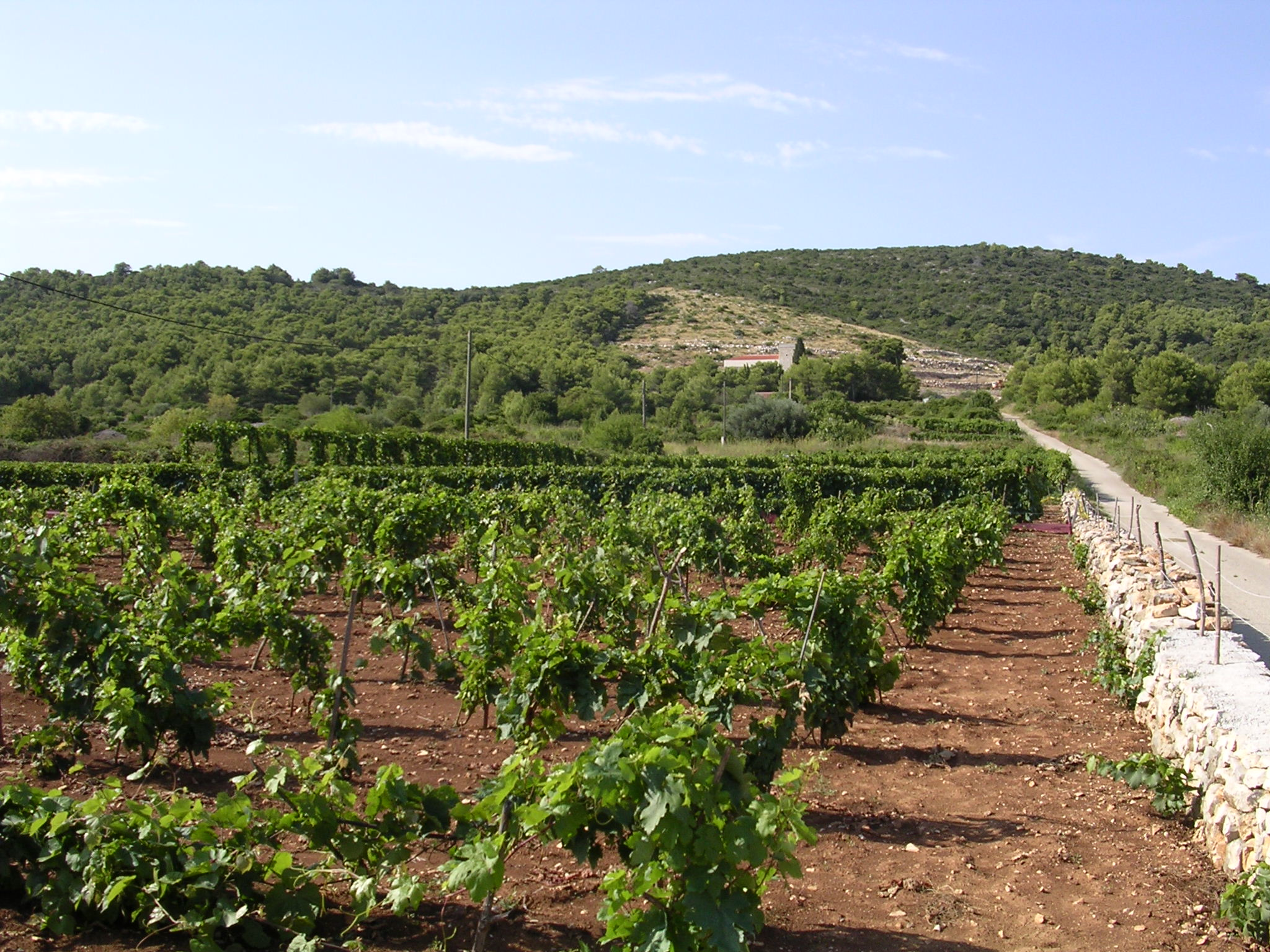
A vineyard on the island of Vis

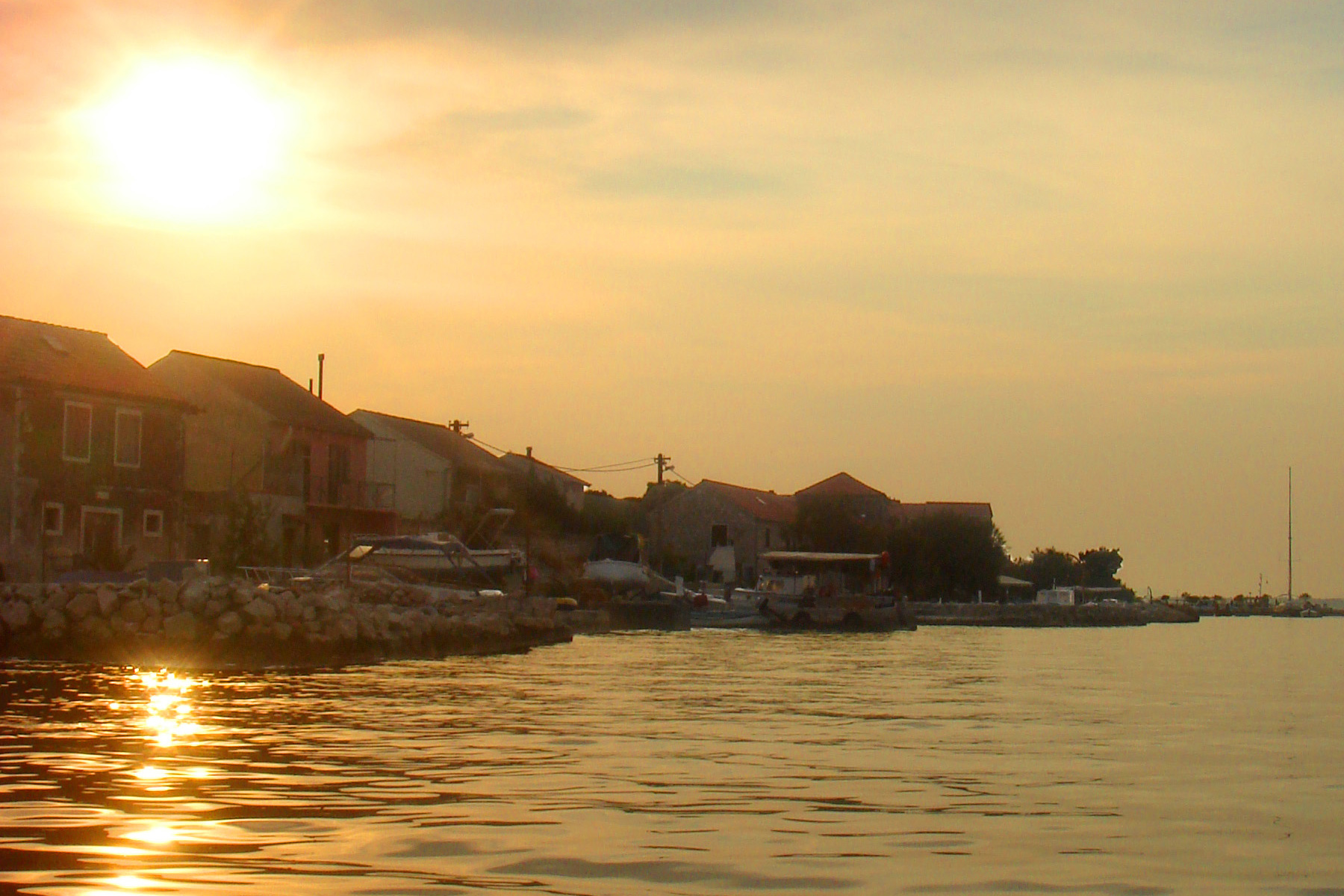
Summer on the island of Krapanj

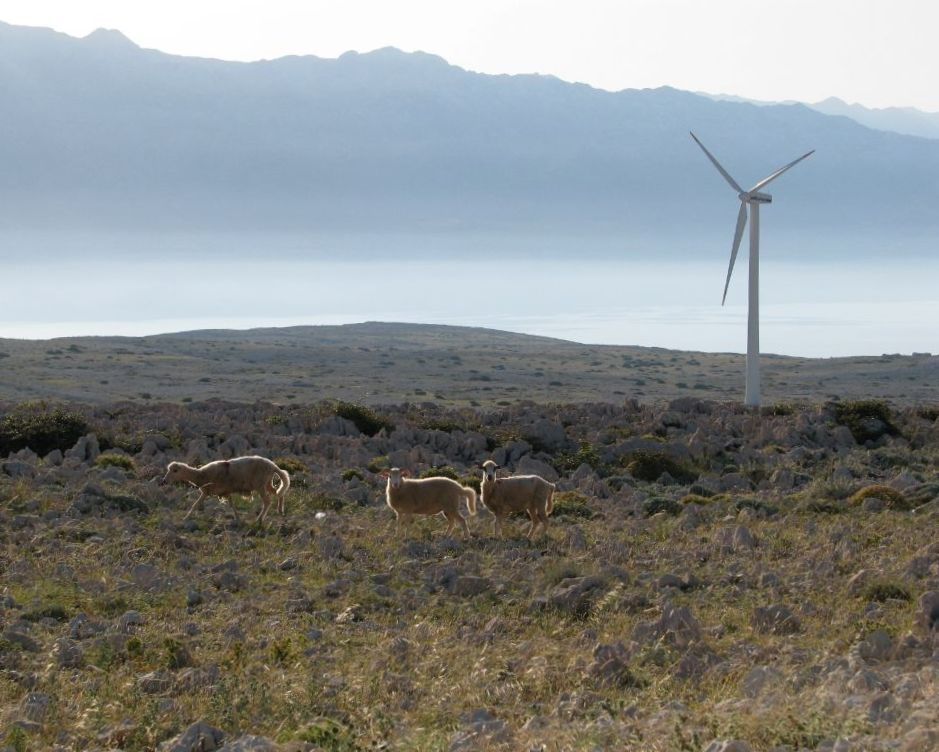
A wind farm on the island of Pag

Population density legend
0 to 10/km^{2} (0.000 to 0.040/acre)
10 to 50/km^{2} (0.040 to 0.202/acre)
50 to 100/km^{2} (0.20 to 0.40/acre)
100 to 150/km^{2} (0.40 to 0.61/acre)
>150/km^{2} (0.61/acre)

Data on the populated islands of Croatia
# (Note: The numbers in the first column of the table indicate each island's rank according to total population.)	Island	County	Population (As of March 2011)	Area	Highest point	Population density
1	Krk	Primorje-Gorski Kotar	19,383	405.78 km^{2} (100,270 acres)	568 m (1,864 ft)	47.8/km^{2} (0.193/acre)
2	Korčula	Dubrovnik-Neretva	15,522	276.03 km^{2} (68,210 acres)	569 m (1,867 ft)	56.2/km^{2} (0.227/acre)
3	Brač	Split-Dalmatia	13,956	394.57 km^{2} (97,500 acres)	780 m (2,560 ft)	35.4/km^{2} (0.143/acre)
4	Hvar	Split-Dalmatia	11,077	299.66 km^{2} (74,050 acres)	628 m (2,060 ft)	37.0/km^{2} (0.150/acre)
5	Rab	Primorje-Gorski Kotar	9,328	90.84 km^{2} (22,450 acres)	410 m (1,350 ft)	102.7/km^{2} (0.416/acre)
6	Pag	Lika-Senj and Zadar	9,059	284.56 km^{2} (70,320 acres)	349 m (1,145 ft)	31.9/km^{2} (0.129/acre)
7	Lošinj	Primorje-Gorski Kotar	7,587	74.68 km^{2} (18,450 acres)	589 m (1,932 ft)	101.6/km^{2} (0.411/acre)
8	Ugljan	Zadar	6,049	50.21 km^{2} (12,410 acres)	286 m (938 ft)	120.5/km^{2} (0.488/acre)
9	Čiovo	Split-Dalmatia	5,908	28.80 km^{2} (7,120 acres)	217 m (712 ft)	205.1/km^{2} (0.830/acre)
10	Murter	Šibenik-Knin	4,895	18.60 km^{2} (4,600 acres)	125 m (410 ft)	263.2/km^{2} (1.065/acre)
11	Vis	Split-Dalmatia	3,445	90.26 km^{2} (22,300 acres)	587 m (1,926 ft)	38.2/km^{2} (0.155/acre)
12	Cres	Primorje-Gorski Kotar	3,079	405.78 km^{2} (100,270 acres)	639 m (2,096 ft)	7.6/km^{2} (0.031/acre)
13	Vir	Zadar	3,000	22.38 km^{2} (5,530 acres)	112 m (367 ft)	134.0/km^{2} (0.542/acre)
14	Pašman	Zadar	2,845	63.34 km^{2} (15,650 acres)	272 m (892 ft)	44.9/km^{2} (0.182/acre)
15	Šolta	Split-Dalmatia	1,700	58.98 km^{2} (14,570 acres)	236 m (774 ft)	28.8/km^{2} (0.117/acre)
16	Dugi Otok	Zadar	1,655	114.44 km^{2} (28,280 acres)	337 m (1,106 ft)	14.5/km^{2} (0.059/acre)
17	Mljet	Dubrovnik-Neretva	1,088	100.41 km^{2} (24,810 acres)	513 m (1,683 ft)	10.8/km^{2} (0.044/acre)
18	Lastovo	Dubrovnik-Neretva	792	46.87 km^{2} (11,580 acres)	415 m (1,362 ft)	16.9/km^{2} (0.068/acre)
19	Šipan	Dubrovnik-Neretva	419	15.81 km^{2} (3,910 acres)	224 m (735 ft)	26.5/km^{2} (0.107/acre)
20	Iž	Zadar	615	17.59 km^{2} (4,350 acres)	168 m (551 ft)	35.0/km^{2} (0.142/acre)
21	Silba	Zadar	292	14.98 km^{2} (3,700 acres)	83 m (272 ft)	19.5/km^{2} (0.079/acre)
22	Prvić	Šibenik-Knin	403	2.37 km^{2} (590 acres)	75 m (246 ft)	170.0/km^{2} (0.688/acre)
23	Zlarin	Šibenik-Knin	284	8.19 km^{2} (2,020 acres)	169 m (554 ft)	34.7/km^{2} (0.140/acre)
24	Vrgada	Zadar	249	3.7 km^{2} (910 acres)	115 m (377 ft)	67.3/km^{2} (0.272/acre)
25	Lopud	Dubrovnik-Neretva	249	4.63 km^{2} (1,140 acres)	216 m (709 ft)	53.8/km^{2} (0.218/acre)
26	Molat	Zadar	197	22.82 km^{2} (5,640 acres)	148 m (486 ft)	8.6/km^{2} (0.035/acre)
27	Kaprije	Šibenik-Knin	189	6.97 km^{2} (1,720 acres)	132 m (433 ft)	27.1/km^{2} (0.110/acre)
28	Ist	Zadar	182	9.7 km^{2} (2,400 acres)	174 m (571 ft)	18.8/km^{2} (0.076/acre)
29	Krapanj	Šibenik-Knin	170	0.36 km^{2} (89 acres)	1.5 m (4.9 ft)	472.2/km^{2} (1.911/acre)
30	Koločep	Dubrovnik-Neretva	163	2.4 km^{2} (590 acres)	125 m (410 ft)	67.9/km^{2} (0.275/acre)
31	Susak	Primorje-Gorski Kotar	151	3.8 km^{2} (940 acres)	98 m (322 ft)	39.7/km^{2} (0.161/acre)
32	Drvenik Veli	Split-Dalmatia	150	12.07 km^{2} (2,980 acres)	178 m (584 ft)	10.8/km^{2} (0.044/acre)
33	Olib	Zadar	140	26.09 km^{2} (6,450 acres)	74 m (243 ft)	5.4/km^{2} (0.022/acre)
34	Rava	Zadar	117	3.6 km^{2} (890 acres)	98 m (322 ft)	32.5/km^{2} (0.132/acre)
35	Žirje	Šibenik-Knin	103	15.06 km^{2} (3,720 acres)	134 m (440 ft)	6.8/km^{2} (0.028/acre)
36	Unije	Primorje-Gorski Kotar	88	16.92 km^{2} (4,180 acres)	132 m (433 ft)	5.2/km^{2} (0.021/acre)
37	Drvenik Mali	Split-Dalmatia	87	3.3 km^{2} (820 acres)	79 m (259 ft)	26.4/km^{2} (0.107/acre)
38	Ilovik	Primorje-Gorski Kotar	85	5.2 km^{2} (1,300 acres)	92 m (302 ft)	16.3/km^{2} (0.066/acre)
39	Premuda	Zadar	64	9.25 km^{2} (2,290 acres)	88 m (289 ft)	6.9/km^{2} (0.028/acre)
40	Sestrunj	Zadar	48	15.03 km^{2} (3,710 acres)	185 m (607 ft)	3.2/km^{2} (0.013/acre)
41	Zverinac	Zadar	43	4.2 km^{2} (1,000 acres)	111 m (364 ft)	10.2/km^{2} (0.041/acre)
42	Rivanj	Zadar	31	4.4 km^{2} (1,100 acres)	112 m (367 ft)	7.0/km^{2} (0.028/acre)
43	Ošljak	Zadar	29	0.3 km^{2} (74 acres)	90 m (300 ft)	96.7/km^{2} (0.391/acre)
44	Kornat	Šibenik-Knin	19	32.30 km^{2} (7,980 acres)	237 m (778 ft)	0.6/km^{2} (0.0024/acre)
45	Biševo	Split-Dalmatia	15	5.8 km^{2} (1,400 acres)	239 m (784 ft)	2.6/km^{2} (0.011/acre)
46	Vele Srakane	Primorje-Gorski Kotar	3	1.15 km^{2} (280 acres)	59 m (194 ft)	2.6/km^{2} (0.011/acre)
47	Male Srakane	Primorje-Gorski Kotar	2	0.61 km^{2} (150 acres)	40 m (130 ft)	3.3/km^{2} (0.013/acre)

== See also ==
- List of islands of Croatia
- List of islands in the Adriatic
