= Gornje Raštane =

- Coordinates: 43.96°N 15.43°E

Area
  - Total: 6.5 km^{2} (2.5 sq mi)

Population (2021)
  - Total: 425
  - Density: 65/km^{2} (170/sq mi)

Gornje Raštane is a village in a municipality Sveti Filip i Jakov, in Zadar County, Croatia.
