= Babac =

Settlement in Zadar County, Croatia

- Settlement
- Interactive map of Babac
- Location within Croatia
- Coordinates: 43°57′33″N 15°24′11″E
- Country: Croatia
- County: Zadar County
- Municipality: Sveti Filip i Jakov

Area
  - Total: 0.8 km^{2} (0.31 sq mi)

Population (2021)
  - Total: 4
  - Density: 5.0/km^{2} (13/sq mi)
- Time zone: UTC+1 (CET)
  - Summer (DST): UTC+2 (CEST)
- Postal code: 23207 Sveti Filip i Jakov
- Area code: +385 (0)23

Babac is a settlement in the Municipality of Sveti Filip i Jakov in Croatia. In 2021, its population was 4.

== History ==
Until the territorial reorganization of Croatia, it was part of the Village of Turanj in the old municipality of Biograd na Moru.

== Demographics ==
Babac: Population trends 2011–2021
v

population		4
	2011	2021

Sources: Croatian Bureau of Statistics publications
