= Galovac, Zadar County =

Galovac
- Municipality
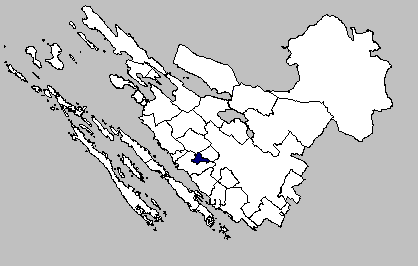
- Map of the Galovac municipality within the Zadar County

- Location of Galovac in Croatia
- Coordinates: 44.0714°N 15.3933°E
- Country: Croatia
- Region: Dalmatia
- County: Zadar County

Government
  - Municipal Mayor: Marin Gulan

Area
  - Municipality: 10.7 km^{2} (4.1 sq mi)
  - Urban: 10.7 km^{2} (4.1 sq mi)

Population (2021)
  - Municipality: 1,258
  - Density: 118/km^{2} (305/sq mi)
  - Urban: 1,258
  - Urban density: 118/km^{2} (305/sq mi)
- Website: galovac.hr

Galovac is a village and the only settlement in the eponymous municipality in Croatia in the Zadar County. In 2011, it had 1,234 inhabitants 99% of whom were Croats. Galovac originated from the ancient village of Tršce and the medieval village of Račice, and was first mentioned in historical documents on February 19, 1361 under the name of Galise, later Galouauas and other versions.

== Demographics ==
Galovac: Population trends 1857–2021
v

population	372	430	519	559	610	714	897	850	1067	1189	1364	1449	1351	1426	1190	1234	1258
	1857	1869	1880	1890	1900	1910	1921	1931	1948	1953	1961	1971	1981	1991	2001	2011	2021

Sources: Croatian Bureau of Statistics publications
