= List of prefects of Zadar County =

This is a list of prefects of Zadar County.

== Prefects of Zadar-Knin County (1993–1997) ==
Croatian Democratic Union (HDZ)

№	Portrait	Name (Born–Died)	Term of Office		Party
1		Šime Prtenjača (1949–)	4 May 1993	1 January 1997	HDZ

== Prefects of Zadar County (1997–) ==
Croatian Democratic Union (HDZ)

№	Portrait	Name (Born–Died)	Term of Office		Party
1		Šime Prtenjača (1949–)	1 January 1997	30 January 2004	HDZ
2		Ivo Grbić (1949–)	30 January 2004	30 January 2008	HDZ
3		Stipe Zrilić (1959–)	30 January 2008	2 June 2017	HDZ
4		Božidar Longin (1960–)	2 June 2017	9 June 2025	HDZ
5		Josip Bilaver (1986–)	9 June 2025	Incumbent	HDZ

== See also ==
- Zadar County
