= Zadar Archipelago =

Archipelago near Zadar, Croatia

Coordinates: 44°02′N 15°07′E

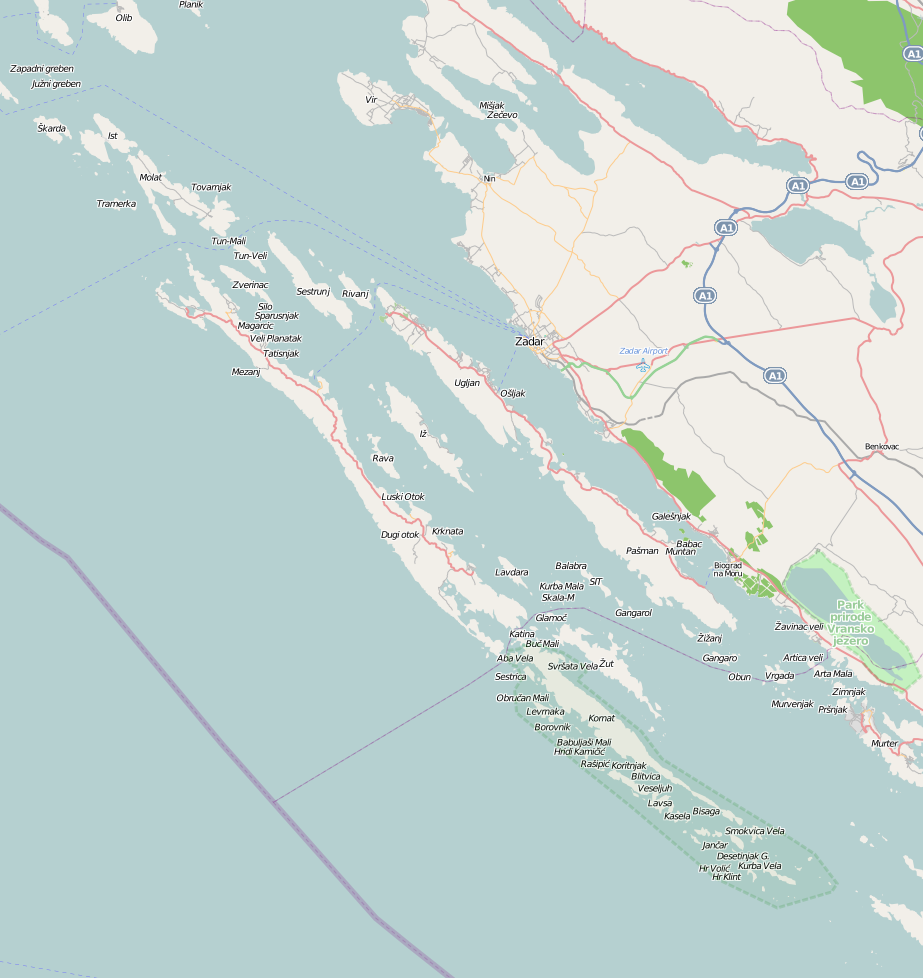
Map of the Zadar Archipelago.

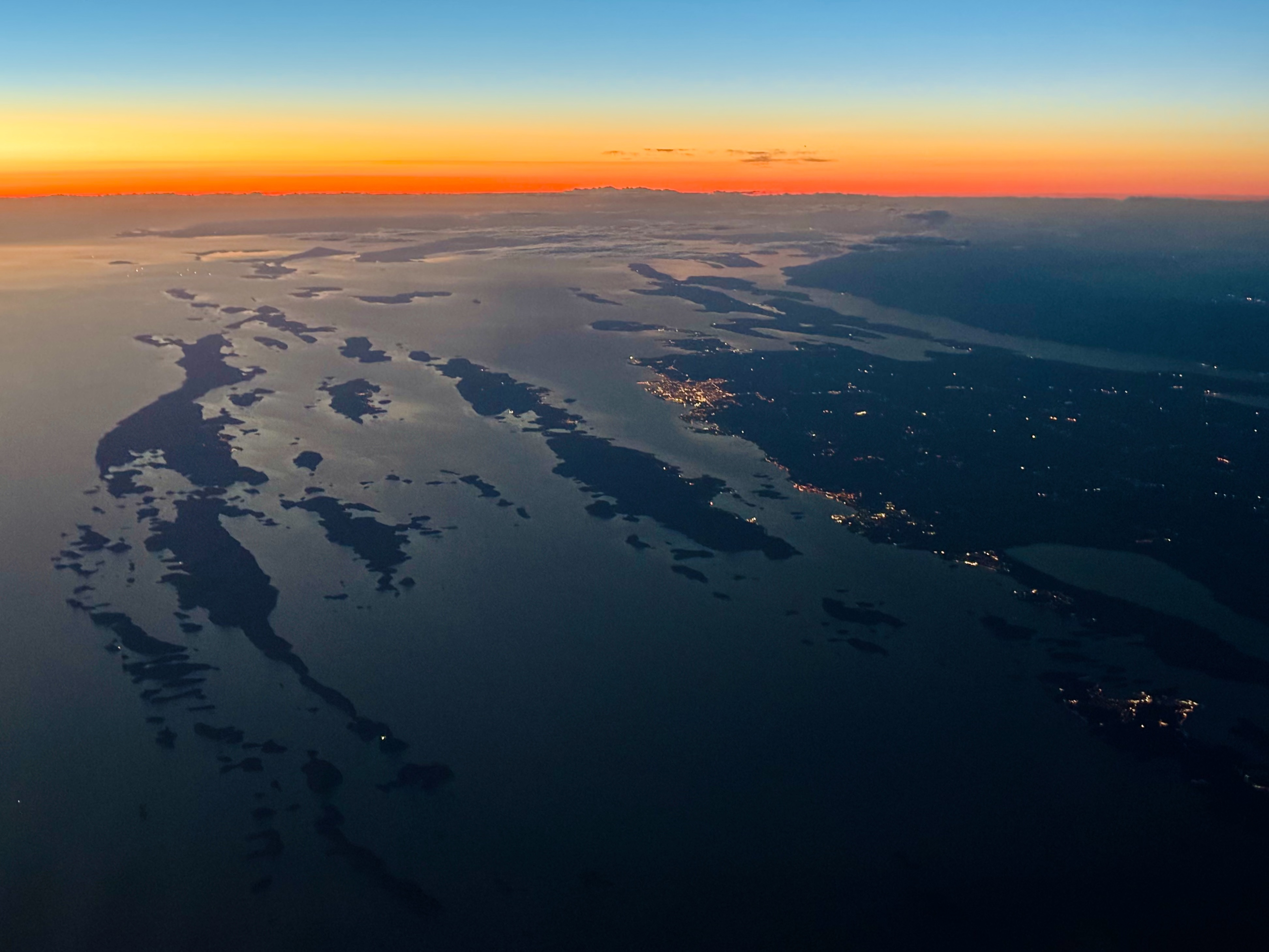
Aerial view of Zadar Archipelago during sunset

The Zadar Archipelago (Croatian: Zadarski otoci) is a group of islands in the Adriatic Sea, near the Croatian city of Zadar.

== Important Bird Area ==
The northern part of the Zadar Archipelago, including the islands of Premuda, Silba, Olib, Škarda, Ist and Molat, has been designated an Important Bird Area (IBA) by BirdLife International because it supports breeding populations of several species of fish-eating seabirds.

== Main islands ==
- Dugi Otok
- Galešnjak
- Iž
- Lavdara
- Ošljak
- Pašman
- Rava
- Rivanj
- Sestrunj
- Tun Veli
- Ugljan
- Vir
- Vrgada
- Zverinac
