= Vrsi =

Municipality and settlement in Zadar, Croatia

- Interactive map of Vrsi
- Location within Croatia
- Coordinates: 44°16′00″N 15°14′00″E
- Country: Croatia
- County: Zadar County

Area
  - Total: 37.0 km^{2} (14.3 sq mi)

Population (2021)
  - Total: 2,045
  - Density: 55.3/km^{2} (143/sq mi)
- Time zone: UTC+1 (CET)
  - Summer (DST): UTC+2 (CEST)
- Website: vrsi.hr

Vrsi is a settlement and a municipality in the Zadar County in Croatia.

The village of Vrsi was first mentioned in written documents in 1387.

Vrsi has been a separate municipality since 2006.

== Demographics ==
In 2021, the municipality had 2,045 residents in the following 2 settlements:

- Poljica, population 432
- Vrsi, population 1613
Vrsi: Population trends 1857–2021
v

population	781	797	942	1031	1149	1408	1730	1753	2398	2536	2561	2605	2246	2772	2453	2053	2045
	1857	1869	1880	1890	1900	1910	1921	1931	1948	1953	1961	1971	1981	1991	2001	2011	2021

Sources: Croatian Bureau of Statistics publications

== Politics ==
=== Minority councils and representatives ===
Directly elected minority councils and representatives are tasked with consulting tasks for the local or regional authorities in which they are advocating for minority rights and interests, integration into public life and participation in the management of local affairs. At the 2023 Croatian national minorities councils and representatives elections Serbs of Croatia fulfilled legal requirements to elect 10 members minority councils of the Municipality of Vrsi but the elections were not held due to the absence of candidatures.
