= Bibinje =

- Municipality
- Općina Bibinje; Bibinje Municipality
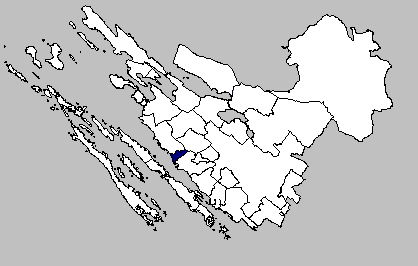
- Location of Bibinje Municipality within the Zadar County
- Interactive map of Bibinje
- Location of Bibinje in Croatia
- Coordinates: 44°04′18″N 15°17′16″E
- Country: Croatia
- Region: Dalmatia
- County: Zadar County

Government
  - Municipal Mayor: Bruno Bugarija

Area
  - Municipality: 14.3 km^{2} (5.5 sq mi)
  - Urban: 14.3 km^{2} (5.5 sq mi)

Population (2021)
  - Municipality: 3,962
  - Density: 277/km^{2} (718/sq mi)
  - Urban: 3,962
  - Urban density: 277/km^{2} (718/sq mi)
- Time zone: UTC+1 (CET)
  - Summer (DST): UTC+2 (CEST)
- Postal code: 23205 Bibinje
- Vehicle registration: ZD
- Website: bibinje.hr

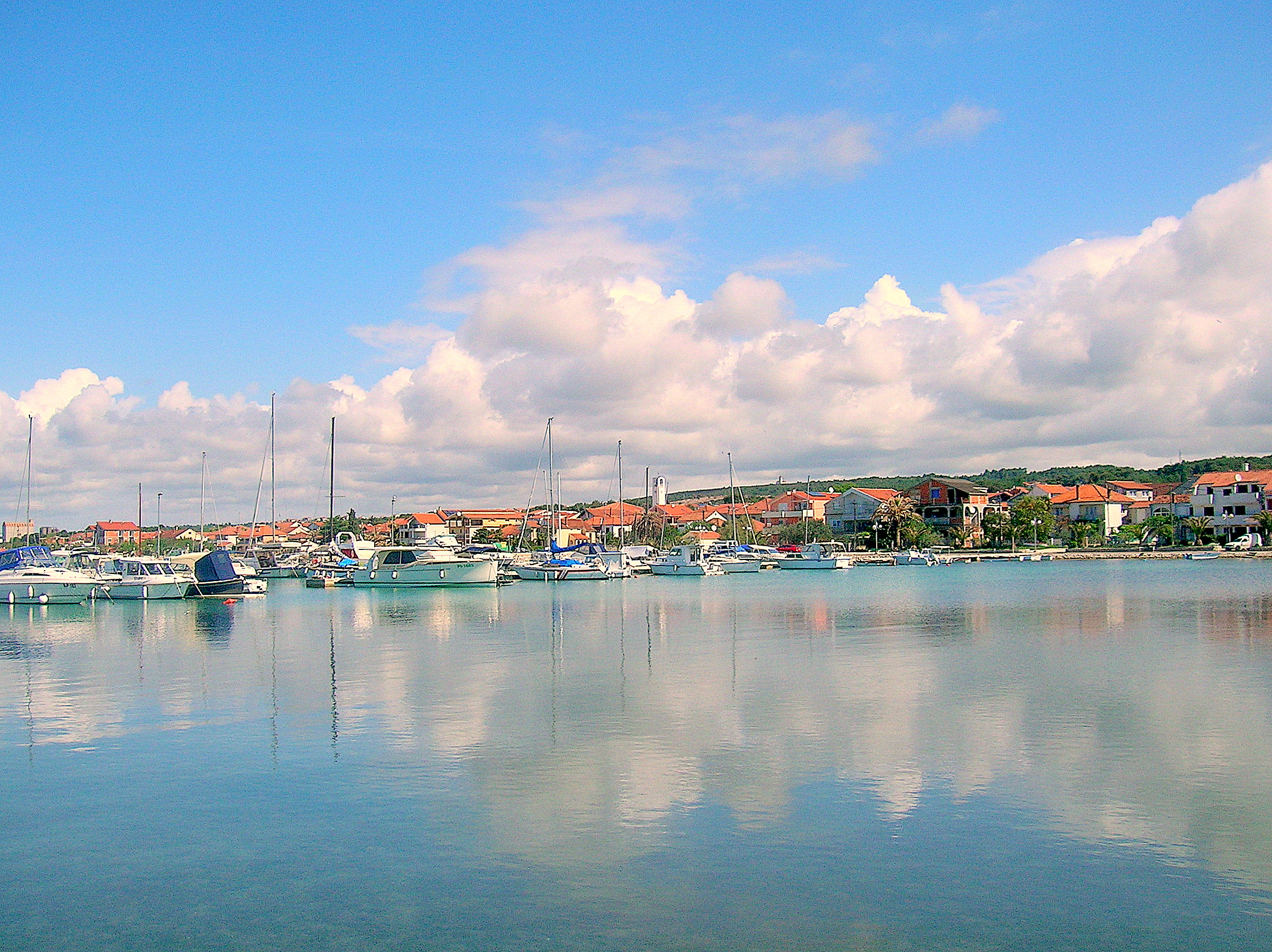
Bibinje

Bibinje (Croatian pronunciation: [bǐbiɲe]) is the only settlement in the eponymous municipality in southern Croatia, a suburb of Zadar, between the Adriatic tourist road and the sea, having a four-kilometer coastline with beaches and pathways. According to the 2011 census, it has 3,985 residents, 97% of which are Croats.

The name Bibano or Bibanium dates as far back as the 11th century. The population always depended on agriculture and cattle breeding, followed by the fishing trade in more recent times.

Bibinje was first mentioned in written documents in 1214. Bibinje has been inhabited since Roman times, which proves the origin of the name of this settlement.

Bibinje was named after Vibius, a Roman patrician who owned property in the area of today's Bibinje.

== Demographics ==
Historical population

Year	Pop.	±%
1857	426	—
1869	485	+13.8%
1880	538	+10.9%
1890	659	+22.5%
1900	738	+12.0%
1910	357	−51.6%
1921	1,100	+208.1%
1931	1,158	+5.3%
1948	1,530	+32.1%

Year	Pop.	±%
1953	1,684	+10.1%
1961	2,053	+21.9%
1971	2,590	+26.2%
1981	3,065	+18.3%
1991	3,777	+23.2%
2001	3,923	+3.9%
2011	3,985	+1.6%
2021	3,962	−0.6%

Source: DZS

Bibinje: Population trends 1857–2021
v

population	426	485	538	659	738	357	1100	1158	1530	1684	2053	2590	3065	3777	3923	3985	3962
	1857	1869	1880	1890	1900	1910	1921	1931	1948	1953	1961	1971	1981	1991	2001	2011	2021

Sources: Croatian Bureau of Statistics publications

== Tourism ==
Tourism dates back to the middle of the 20th century. The marina called Dalmacija, at about 70,000 m^{2}, is the largest Adriatic marina, with 1,400 berths.

The town museum contains an ethnographic collection, while the Church of John the Baptist houses 15th-century religious artifacts. Bibinje has five Catholic churches.

The village is home to a monument to the first Croatian president Franjo Tuđman and a memorial entitled Greeting to the Sea.
