= Sveti Filip i Jakov =

Sv. Filip i Jakov Filipjakov
- Municipality
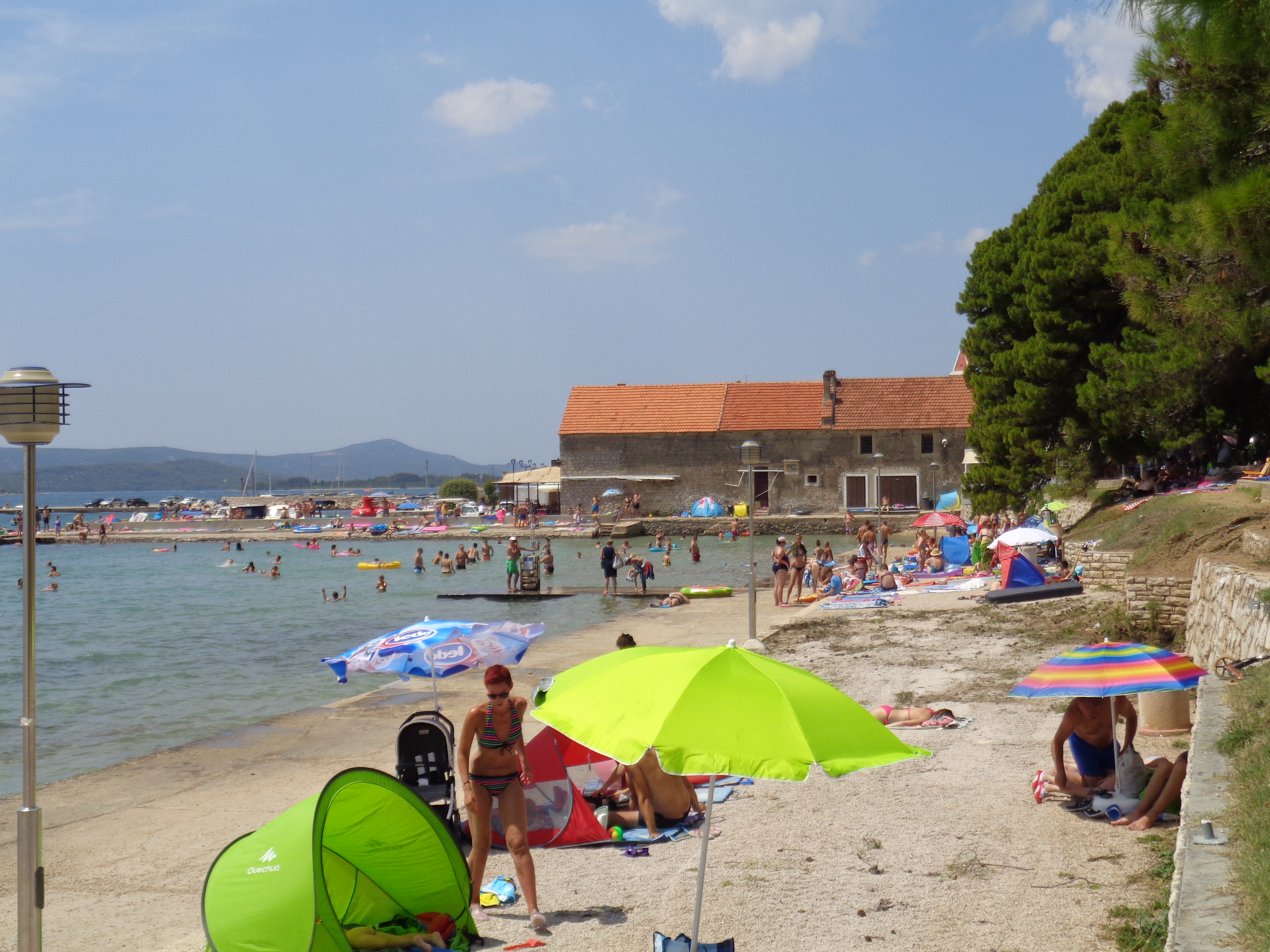
- Beach in the village
- Interactive map of Sv. Filip i Jakov
- Location within Croatia
- Coordinates: 43°57′41.17″N 15°25′29.29″E
- Country: Croatia
- Region: Dalmatia
- County: Zadar County

Area
  - Municipality: 47.6 km^{2} (18.4 sq mi)
  - Urban: 11.1 km^{2} (4.3 sq mi)

Population (2021)
  - Municipality: 4,461
  - Density: 93.7/km^{2} (243/sq mi)
  - Urban: 1,603
  - Urban density: 144/km^{2} (374/sq mi)
- Time zone: UTC+1 (CET)
  - Summer (DST): UTC+2 (CEST)
- Postal code: 23207
- Website: opcina-svfilipjakov.hr

Sveti Filip i Jakov (lit. 'Saints Phillip and Jacob') is a village and a municipality in the Zadar County in Croatia.

== History ==
Sveti Filip and Jakov were first mentioned in historical documents in 1387, in the document "sub Rogoua ad sanctus Philipum et Jacobum" and in 1388 as "contrada of Saint Jacob" - positi Rogue iuxtra in contrata sancti lacobi.'' The old center place was built during the 16th and 17th centuries.

== Demographics ==
In 2021, the municipality had 4,461 residents in the following settlements:

- Babac, population 4
- Donje Raštane, population 485
- Gornje Raštane, population 425
- Sikovo, population 365
- Sveti Filip i Jakov, population 1,603
- Sveti Petar na Moru, population 458
- Turanj, population 1,121

At the time of the 2011 census, 98% of the inhabitants were Croats.

Historical population

Year	Pop.	±%
1857	1,070	—
1869	1,075	+0.5%
1880	1,082	+0.7%
1890	1,208	+11.6%
1900	1,472	+21.9%
1910	1,708	+16.0%
1921	2,287	+33.9%
1931	2,214	−3.2%
1948	2,851	+28.8%

Year	Pop.	±%
1953	3,274	+14.8%
1961	3,780	+15.5%
1971	3,955	+4.6%
1981	4,125	+4.3%
1991	4,599	+11.5%
2001	4,482	−2.5%
2011	4,606	+2.8%
2021	4,461	−3.1%

Source: DZS

Sveti Filip i Jakov: Population trends 1857–2021
v

population	1070	1075	1082	1208	1472	1708	2287	2214	2851	3274	3780	3955	4125	4599	4482	4606	4461
	1857	1869	1880	1890	1900	1910	1921	1931	1948	1953	1961	1971	1981	1991	2001	2011	2021

Sources: Croatian Bureau of Statistics publications

== Landmarks ==
The municipality's Church of Saint Roch (Croatian: Crkva svetog Roka) is classified by the Croatian government as a tourist locality.
