= Lavdara =

Uninhabited Croatian island in Adriatic Sea

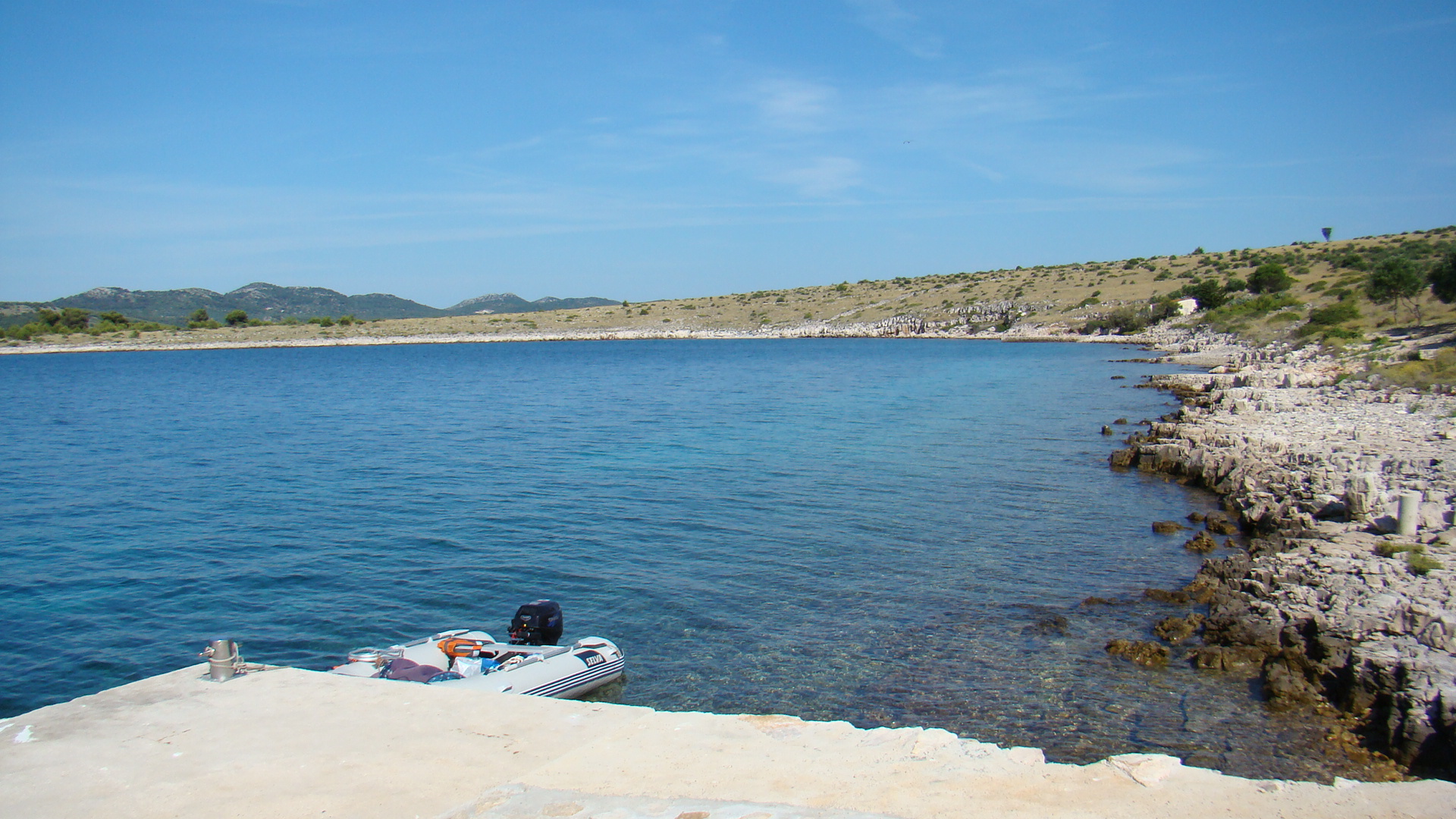

- Location within Croatia
- Interactive map of Lavdara

Geography
- Location: Adriatic Sea
- Coordinates: 43°56′11″N 15°12′30″E
- Area: 2.27 km^{2} (0.88 sq mi)
- Length: 3.9 km (2.42 mi)
- Width: 1.0 km (0.62 mi)
- Highest elevation: 87 m (285 ft)
- Highest point: Veli Vrh

Administration
- Croatia
- County: Zadar County

Demographics
- Population: 0

Lavdara is an uninhabited Croatian island in the Adriatic Sea located east of Dugi Otok. Its area is 2.27 km^{2} (0.88 sq mi).

The island is 3 km long, and the widest part is 1 km wide.

By boat, the coast of the island can be reached in 15 minutes from the Sali, the nearest inhabited place on Dugi Otok.

== Bibliography ==
- Filipi, Amos Rube (2001). "Otok Lavdara - Prilog povijesno-geografskim istraživanjima zadarskih otoka" [Lavdara Island - Contribution to the Historio-geographical Explorations of the Zadar Archipelago Islands] (PDF). Geoadria (in Croatian). 6 (1): 113–152. doi:10.15291/geoadria.167.
