= Zadar County =

County in Croatia

Coordinates: 44.018°N 15.895°E

Zadar County Zadarska županija (Croatian)
- County
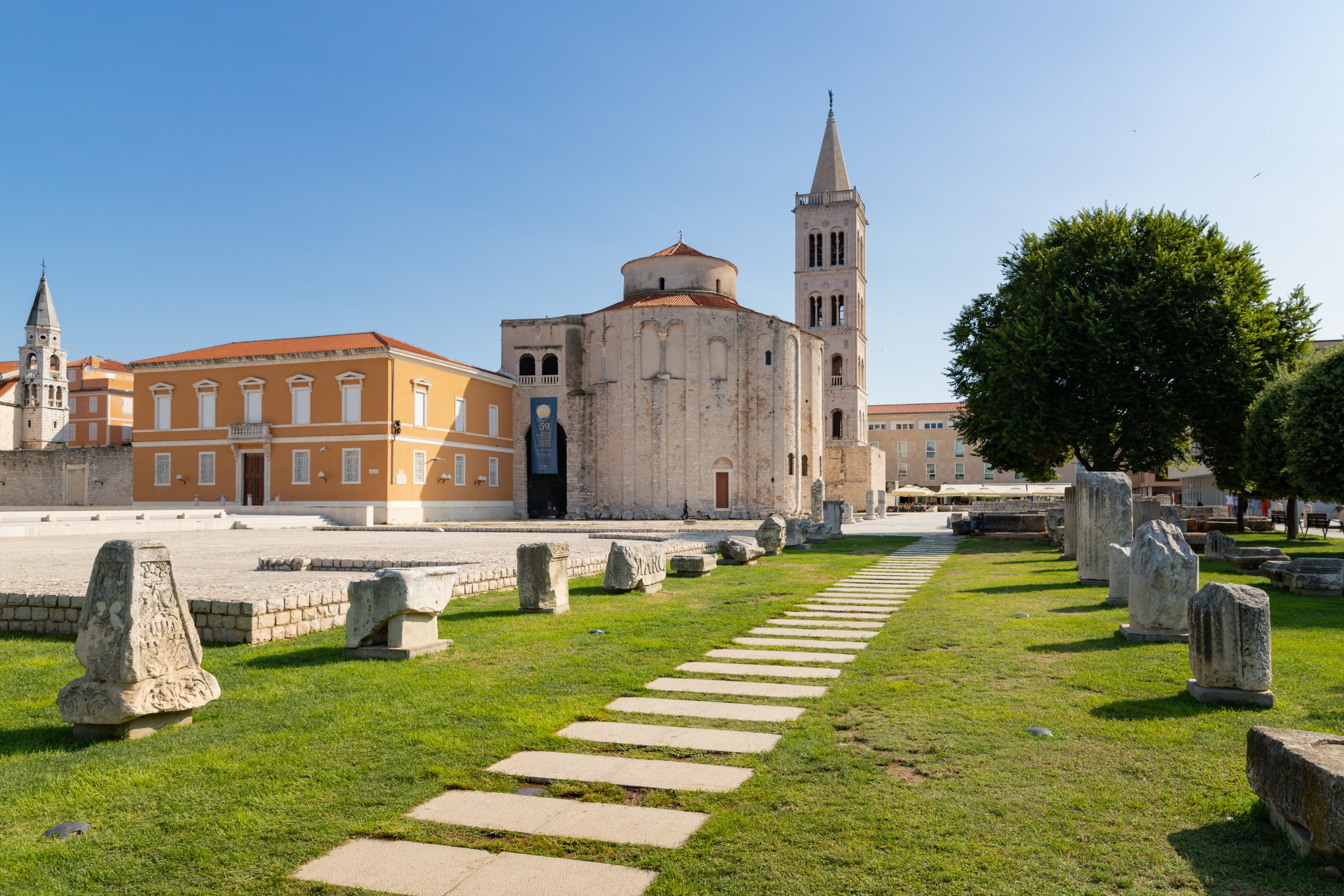
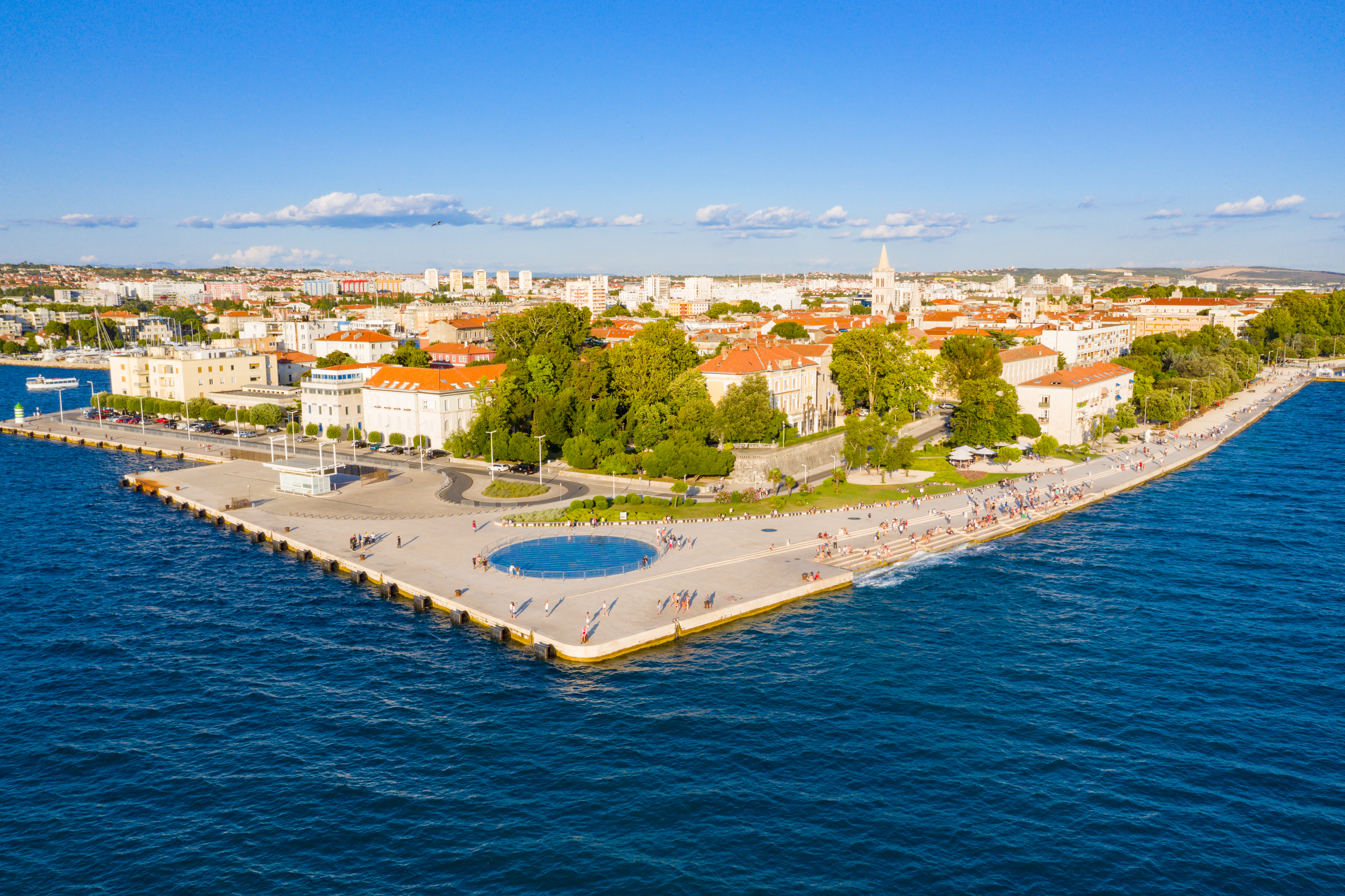
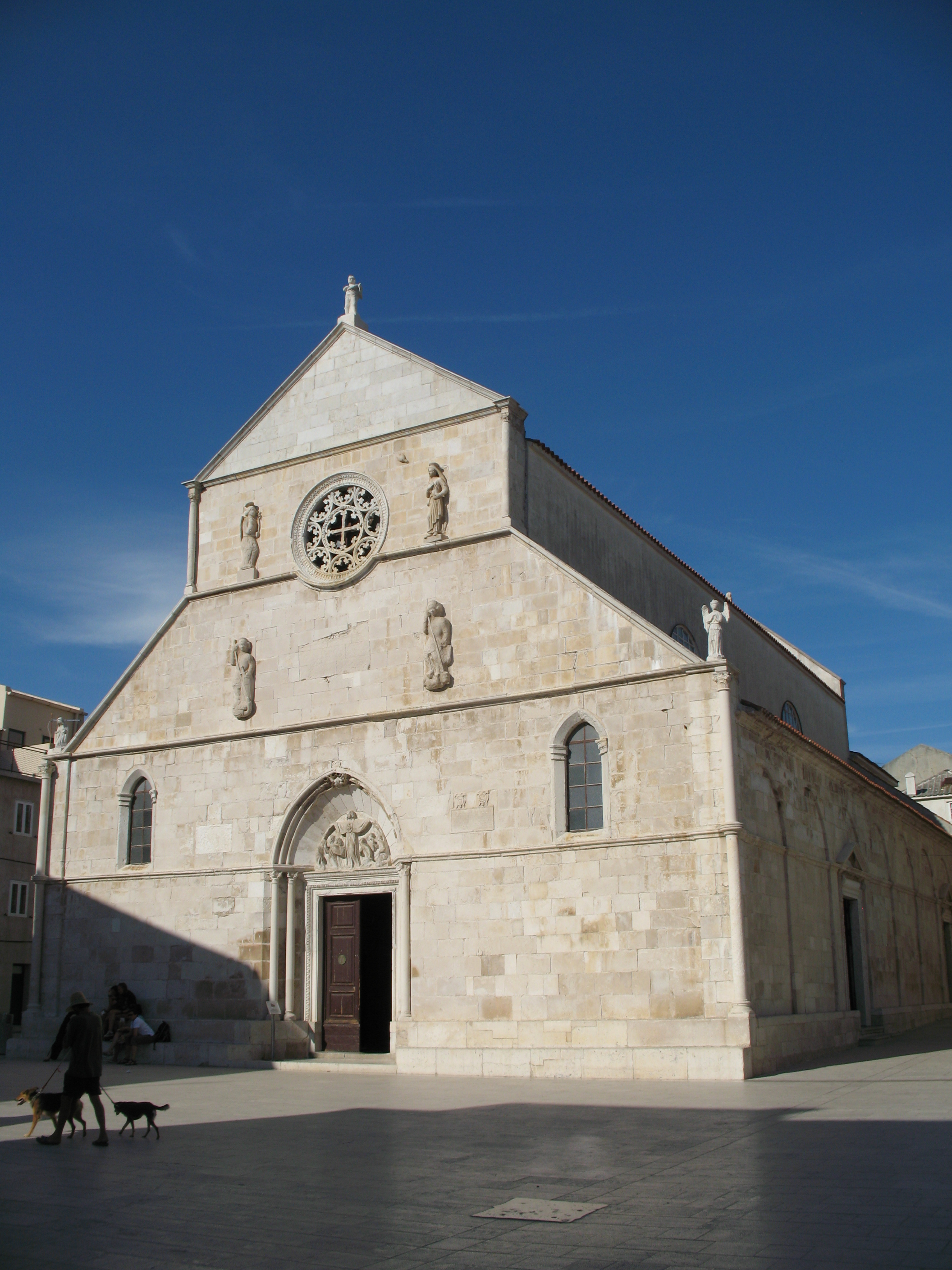
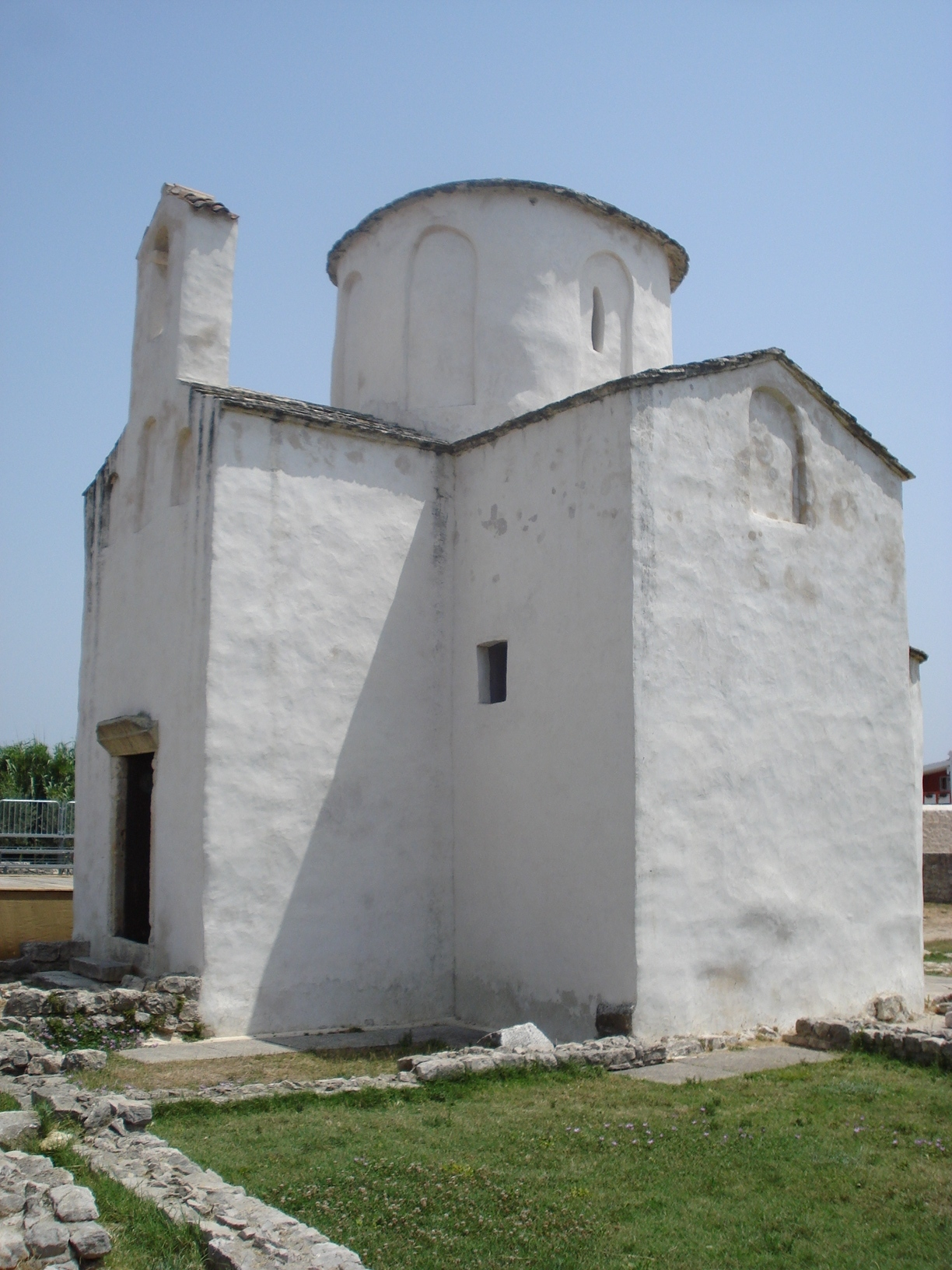
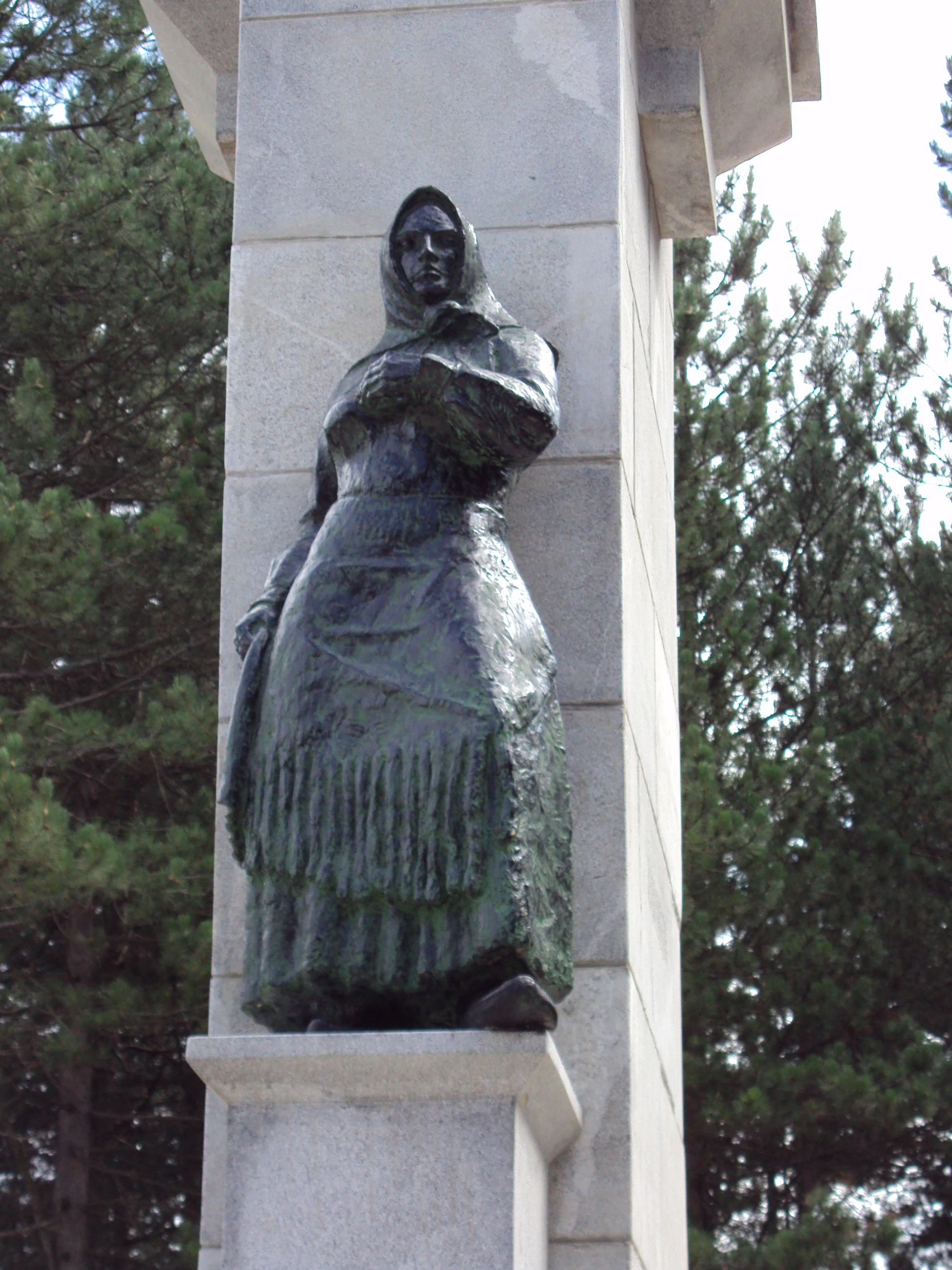
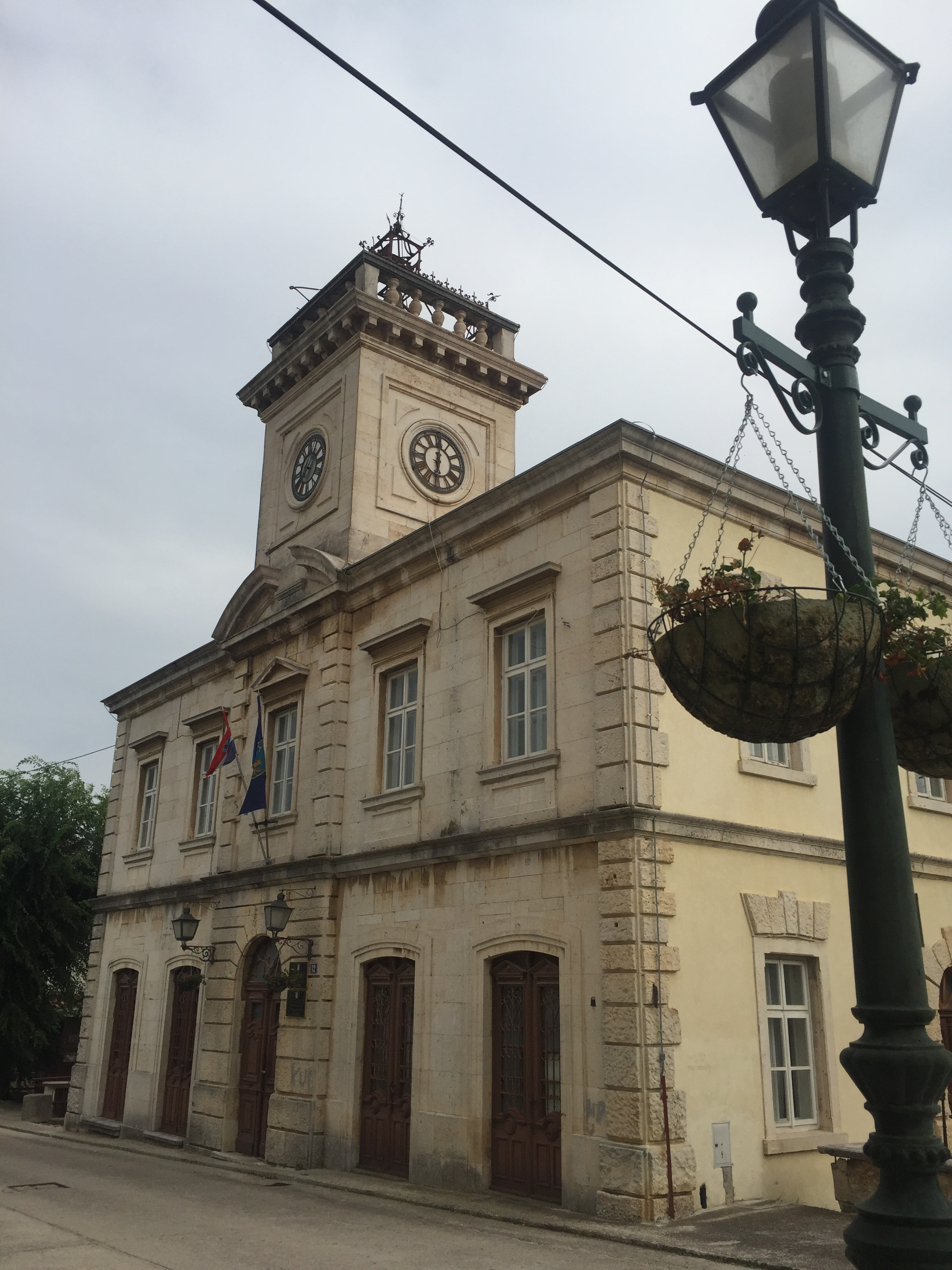
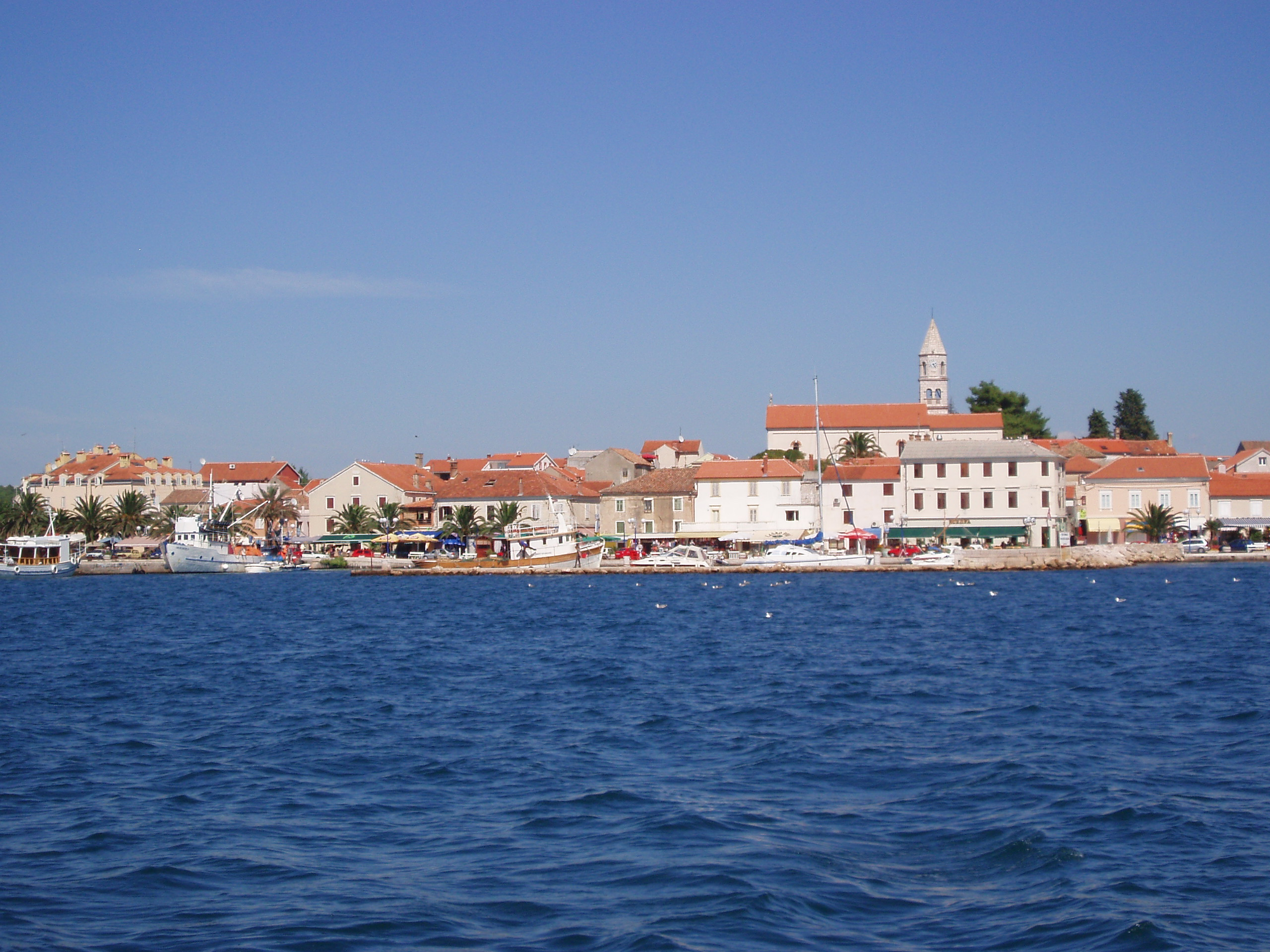
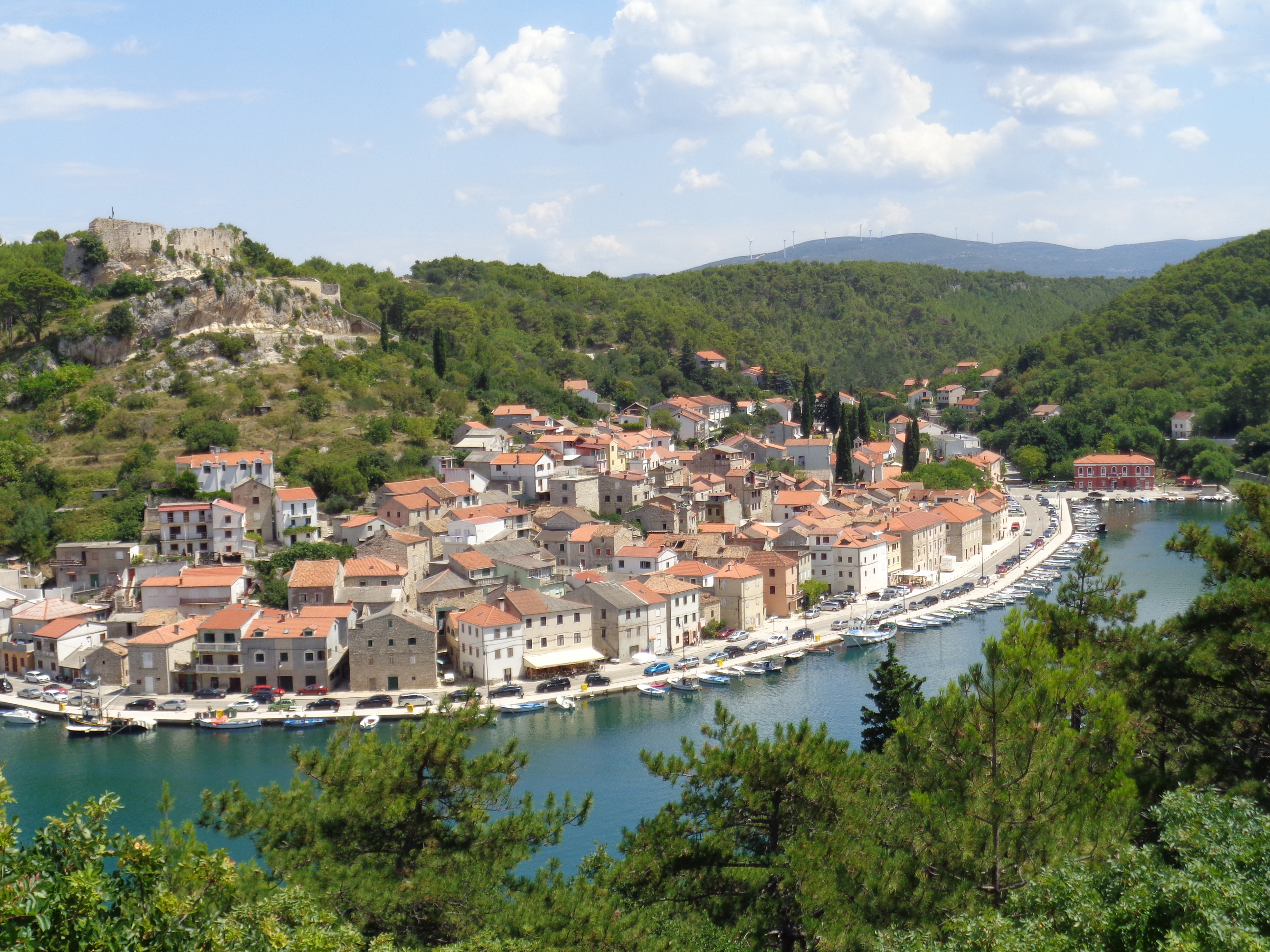
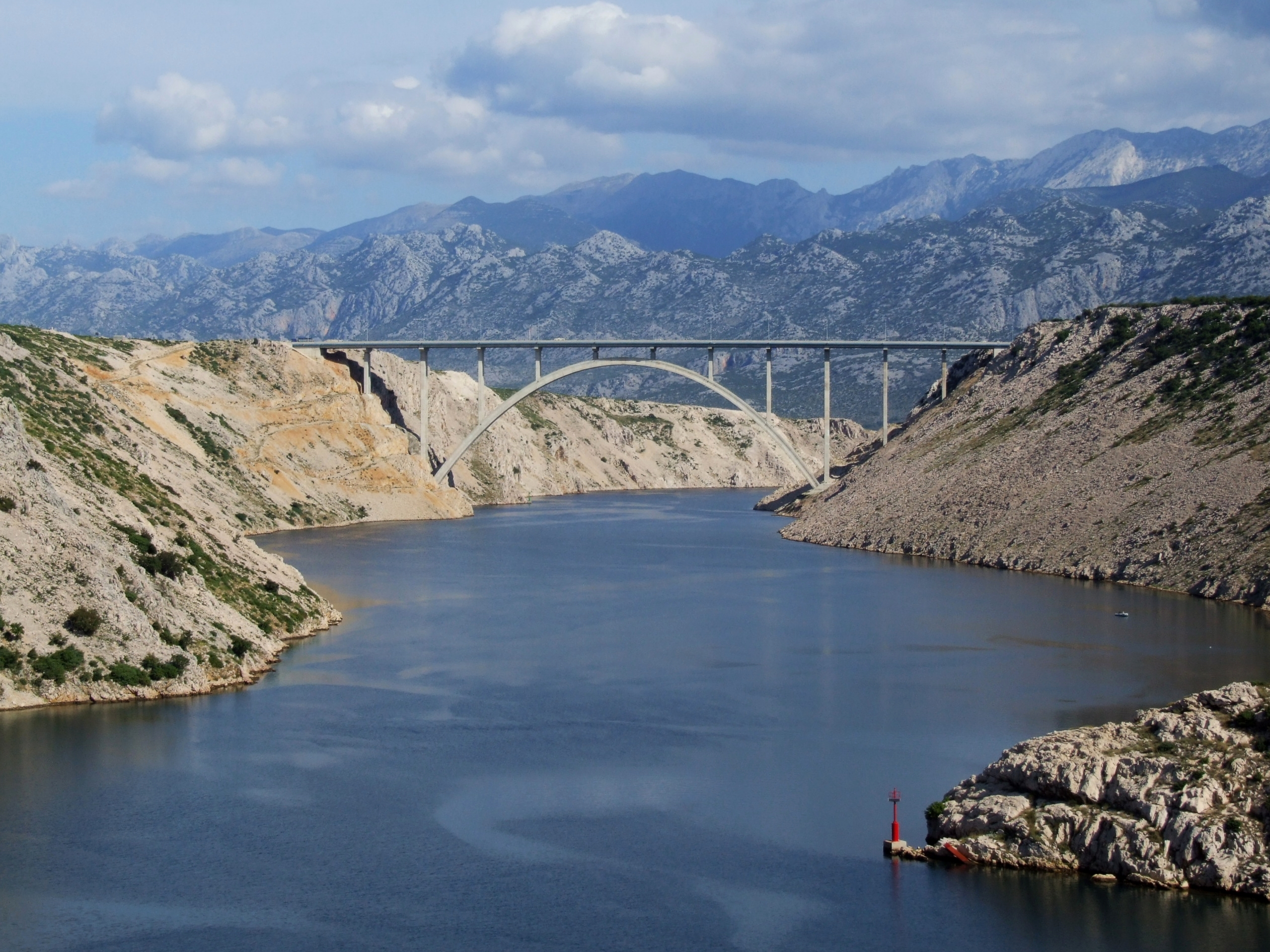
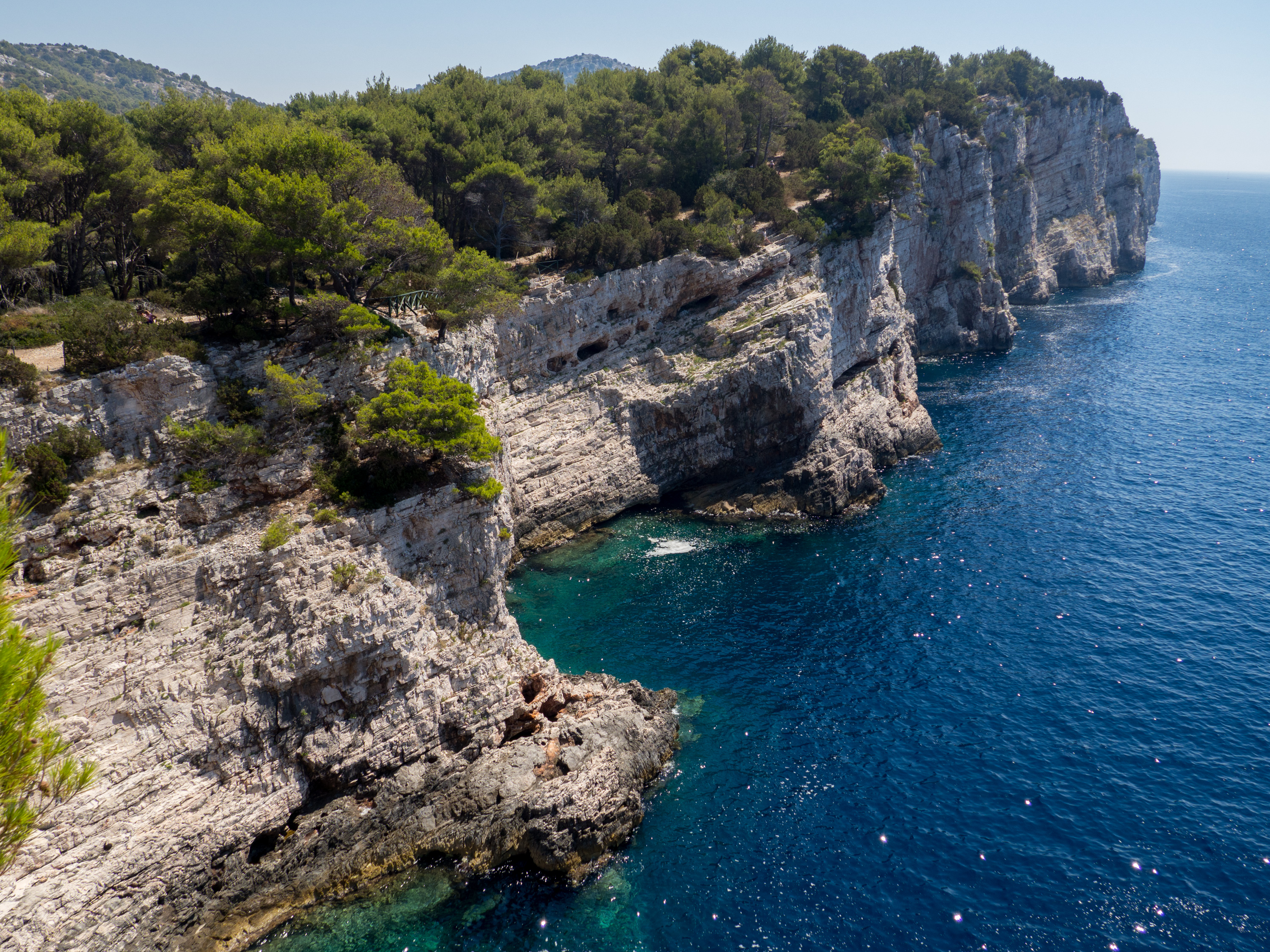

- Flag Coat of arms

- Zadar County within Croatia
- Country: Croatia
- County seat: Zadar

Government
  - Župan (Prefect): Josip Bilaver (HDZ)
  - County Assembly: 42 members: • HDZ, HRAST, HSU, NS-R (20); • SDP, HNS, DSU (9); • AM, MOST (4); • ŽZ (2); • MODES (2); • Independents (5)

Area
  - Total: 3,646 km^{2} (1,408 sq mi)

Population (2021)
  - Total: 160,085
  - Density: 43.91/km^{2} (113.7/sq mi)
- Area code: 023
- ISO 3166 code: HR-13
- HDI (2022): 0.860 very high · 7th
- Website: www.zadarska-zupanija.hr

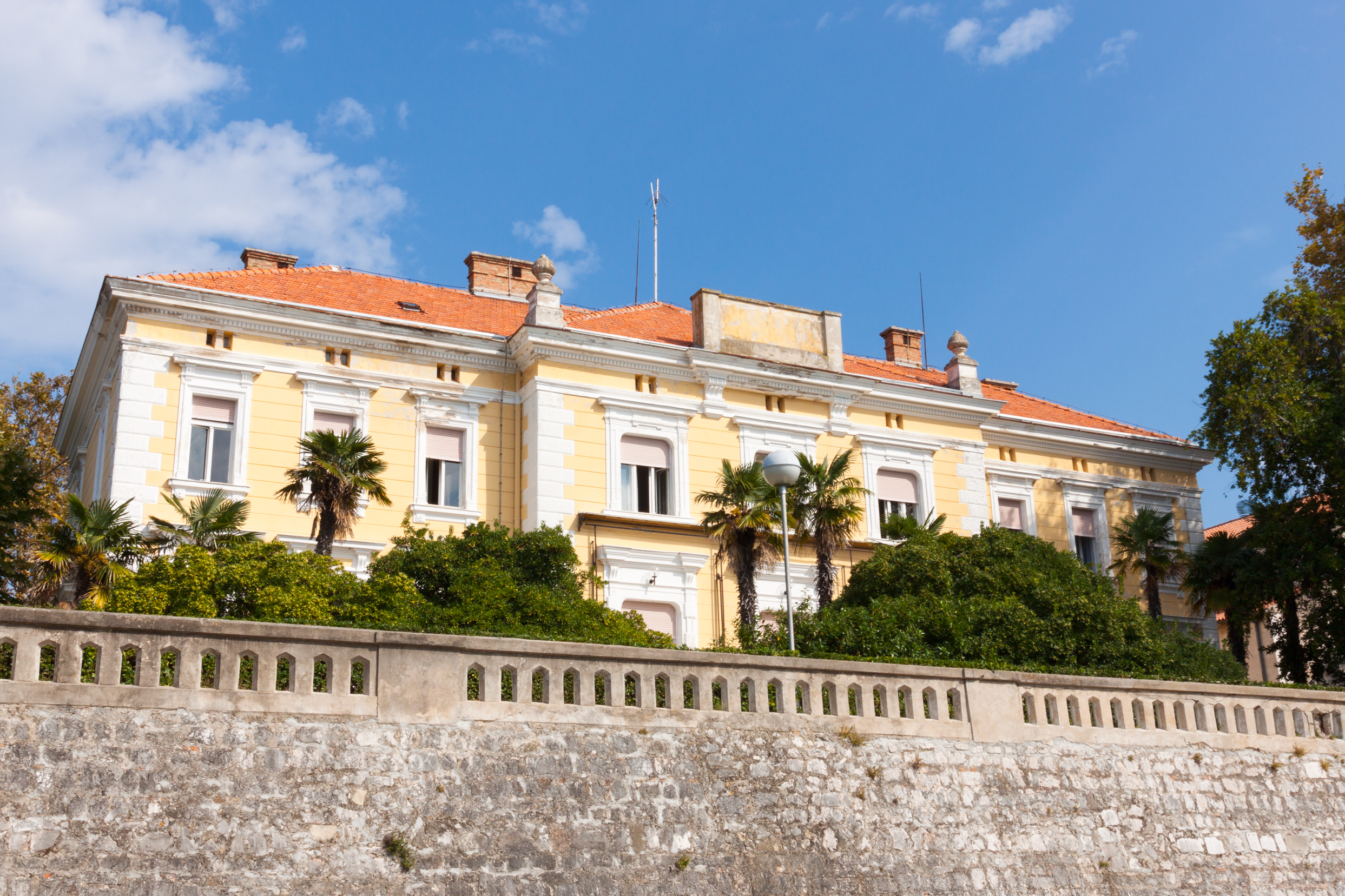
County Government Palace

Zadar County (Croatian: Zadarska županija, [zâdarskaː ʒupǎnija]) is a county in Croatia, it encompasses northern Dalmatia and southeastern Lika. Its seat is the city of Zadar.

== Geography ==
Among the largest towns in the county of Zadar are: Zadar, Benkovac, Bibinje, Biograd, Nin, Obrovac and Pag.

The county of Zadar includes the islands of Dugi otok, Ugljan, Pašman, Molat, Lavdara, Zverinac, Vir and most of Pag, as well as a number of other, smaller islands. It also features the Paklenica national park.

The county's area is 7,854 km^{2}, 3,646 km^{2} is land, which accounts for 6.4% of the territory of Croatia. The sea area of the county is 3,632 km^{2} (around 12% of the territorial waters) and the insular area is 580 km^{2}, with more than 300 smaller and larger islands (Zadar Archipelago). The length of its coastline (including the islands) is 1,300 km.

== Administrative division ==
Zadar County is divided into:

- City
  - Zadar
- Towns
  - Benkovac
  - Biograd na Moru
  - Nin
  - Obrovac
  - Pag
- Municipalities
  - Bibinje
  - Galovac
  - Gračac
  - Jasenice
  - Kali
  - Kolan
  - Kukljica
  - Lišane Ostrovičke
  - Novigrad
  - Pakoštane
  - Pašman
  - Polača
  - Poličnik
  - Posedarje
  - Povljana
  - Preko
  - Privlaka
  - Ražanac
  - Sali
  - Stankovci
  - Starigrad
  - Sukošan
  - Sveti Filip i Jakov
  - Škabrnja
  - Tkon
  - Vir
  - Vrsi
  - Zemunik Donji

== County government ==
See organization of Croatian counties.

As of 2014, the Župan is Božidar Longin of the Croatian Democratic Union (HDZ), and the county assembly's 42 representatives are affiliated as follows:

- Croatian Democratic Union: 15
- Social Democratic Party of Croatia (SDP): 8
- Croatian Party of Rights dr. Ante Starčević: 5
- Akcija mladih: 3
- Lista grupe birača: 2
- Croatian Party of Pensioners (HSU): 2
- Croatian Peasants Party (HSS): 1
- Croatian Social Liberal Party (HSLS): 1
- Croatian Party of Rights (HSP): 1
- Democratic Party of Pensioners (DSU): 1
- Croatian Pure Party of Rights (HČSP): 1
- Croatian Labourists – Labour Party: 1
- Independent: 1

=== Minority councils and representatives ===
Directly elected minority councils and representatives are tasked with consulting tasks for the local or regional authorities in which they are advocating for minority rights and interests, integration into public life and participation in the management of local affairs. At the 2023 Croatian national minorities councils and representatives elections Albanians and Serbs of Croatia fulfilled legal requirements to each elect their own 25 members minority councils of the Zadar County while Bosniaks and Slovenes of Croatia elect individual representatives and with Hungarian, German and Italian representatives remaining unelected due to the absence of candidatures. Some municipalities and towns in the county elected their own local minority councils as well but disproportionally high number of local minority elections were not held due to the absence of candidatures.

== Demographics ==
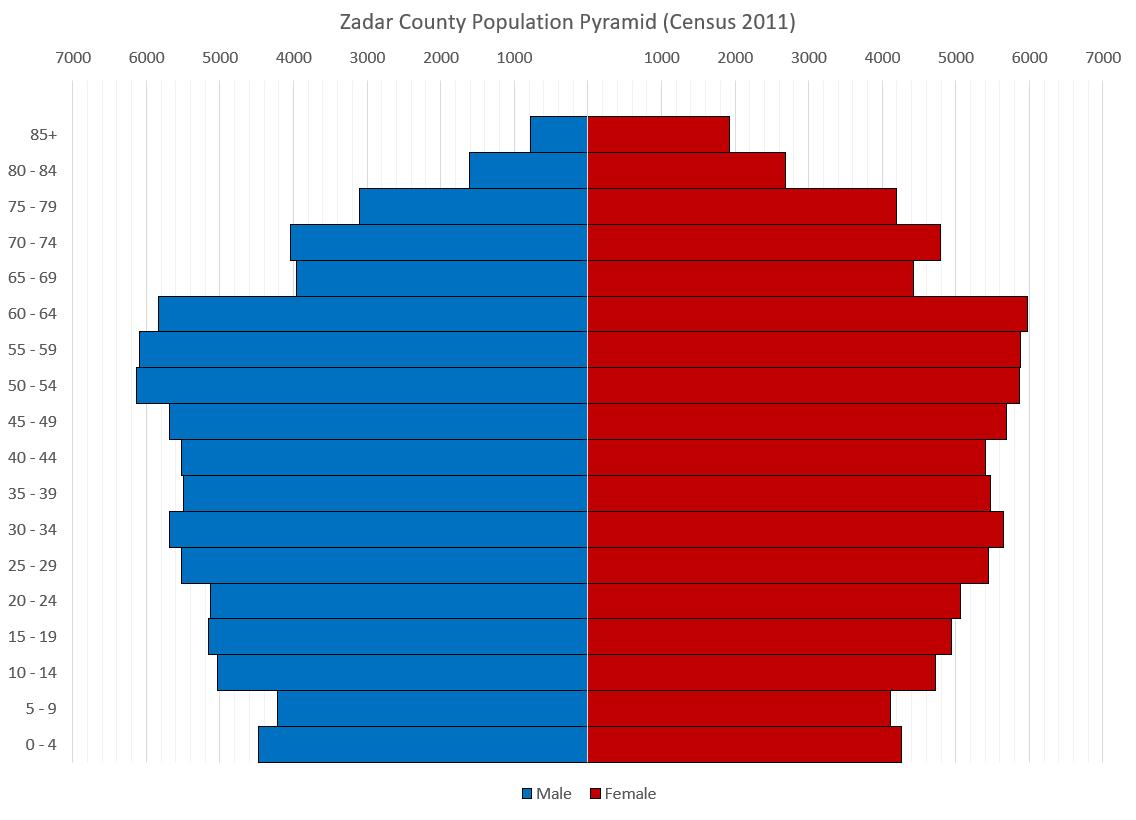
Zadar County Population Pyramid (2011)

According to the 2011 census, Zadar County has population of 170,017, accounting for 4.0% of the total Croatia's population. Croats make up the majority with 93.54% of the population, while Serbs, Bosniaks, Albanians and Italians form the remainder.

Zadar County: Population trends 1857–2021
v

population	84091	94156	98063	108330	123375	136522	146375	149855	154026	162682	174957	190356	194098	214777	162045	170017	160085
	1857	1869	1880	1890	1900	1910	1921	1931	1948	1953	1961	1971	1981	1991	2001	2011	2021

Sources: Croatian Bureau of Statistics publications

== Infrastructure ==
The County of Zadar plays a leading role in road and railway traffic links between northern and southern Croatia.

The Adriatic Highway, the main road along the Adriatic Sea passes through the county, as does the A1 motorway, completed as far as Split in 2005. The Zagreb-Knin-Split railway line with branch-lines to Zadar and Šibenik pass through the county.

Maritime traffic is carried by the coastal route of the Adriatic Sea, by the Zadar-Ancona international car ferry route which is the shortest link between Central Europe and Italy, via Zagreb and Zadar to Rome and southward. Another route by which intensive traffic is carried is Zadar - Maslenica Bridge - St. Rok Tunnel - Zagreb.

The Zadar Airport has recently been reconstructed and modernised. With runway improvements still to be undertaken it will eventually have the capacity to handle jumbo-jets.

There is also a very frequent maritime passenger port in the town of Zadar and the cargo maritime port in the Gaženica area whose current manipulative capacity amounts to one million tonnes per year. A construction of a wharf would raise this significantly. The port's manipulative and warehouse capacities are used only in part.

== Economy ==
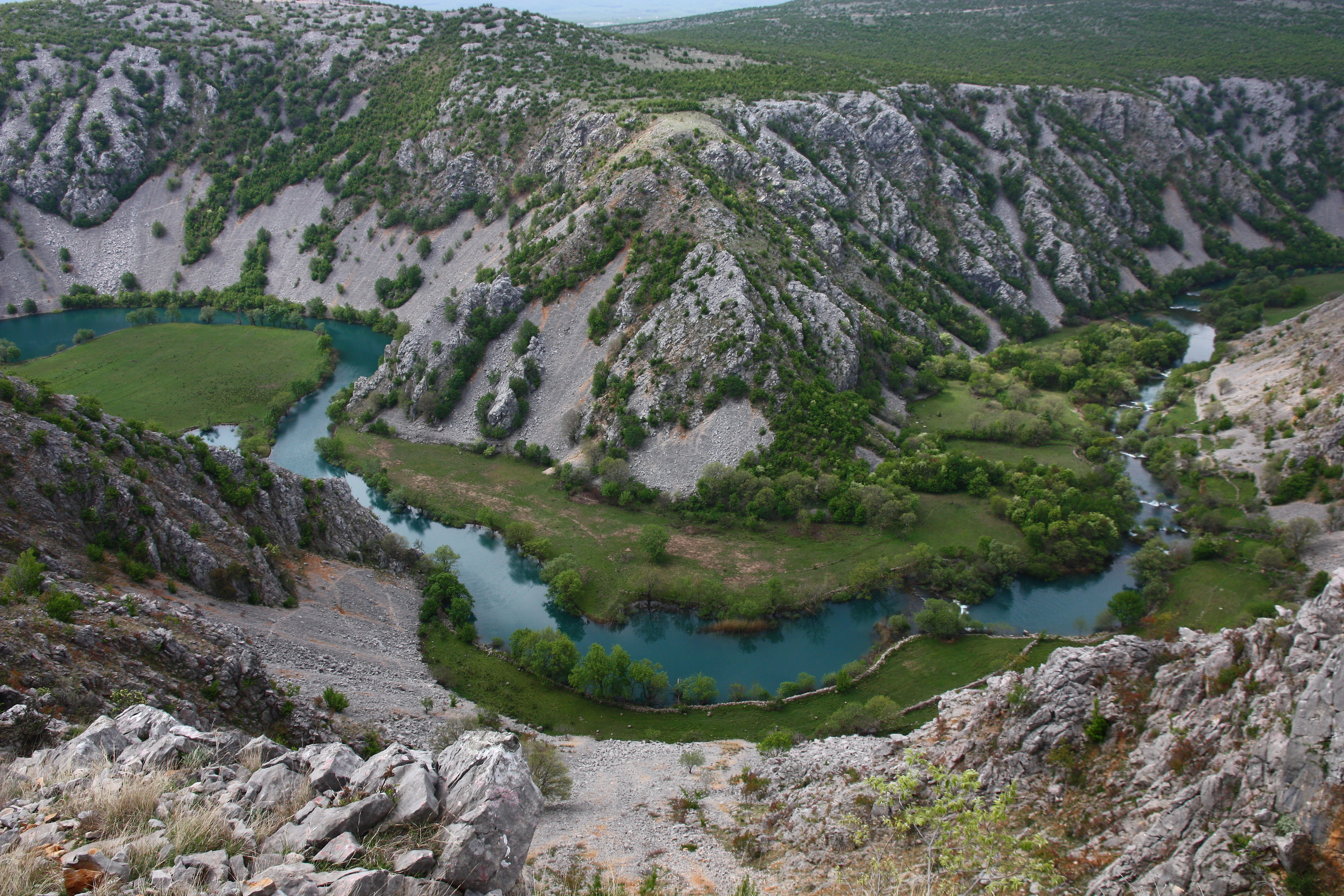
Krupa River in Velebit nature park

The Ravni Kotari area constitutes the greater part of the county's inland, containing most of the cultivated farmland and towns having industry, crafts, trade and traffic development potential.

Tourism is one of the county's most important industries, owing to its geographical position, mild climate, indented coast, clear sea, numerous bays, inlets and beaches on 1,300 km of the sea coast and islands. Tourist amenities of the Zadar County are also the areas of outstanding natural beauty: the Velebit, Telaščica and Paklenica and adjacent Krka and Kornati national parks in the south and the Plitvice Lakes national park in the north.

== Acknowledgements ==
Honorary citizens

Following Croatia national football team's silver medal at the 2018 FIFA World Cup, County Committee declared in 2019 Croatian representatives Luka Modrić, Danijel Subašić, Šime Vrsaljko and Dominik Livaković County's honorary citizens.
