= Rava (island) =

Island in Croatia

Coordinates: 44.021941°N 15.066386°E

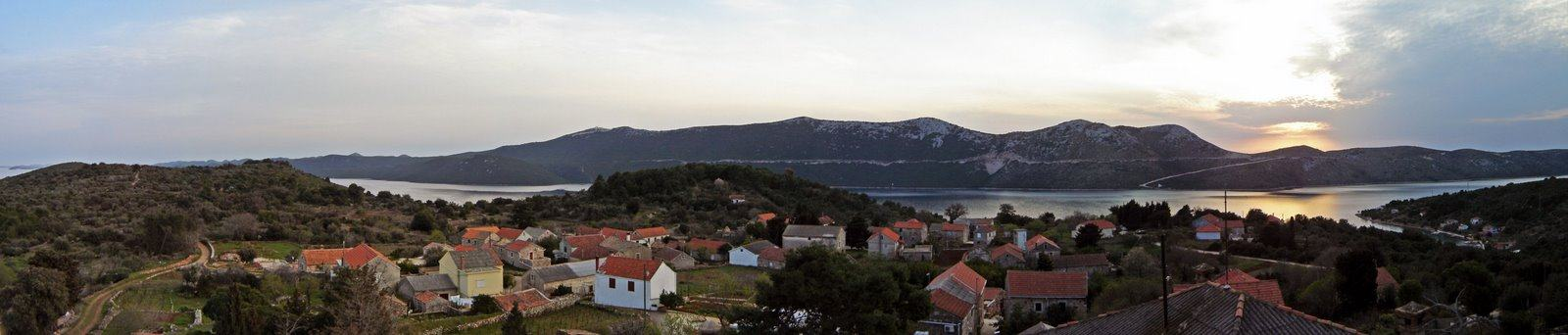
Rava panorama

Map

Rava is an island in the Croatian part of the Adriatic Sea. It is situated in the Zadar Archipelago, between Iž and Dugi Otok, 16 nautical miles (30 km) from Zadar. Its area is 3.6 km^{2}, and it has a population of 117 (as of 2011). The only settlements on the island are Vela Rava and Mala Rava. The coast of the island is very indented with 13 bays and 15.45 kilometres (9.6 miles) of coastline. The island is composed of dolomite. The primary industries are agriculture (mainly olives, but some vineyards also) and fishing.

== Relief ==
=== Reljef ===
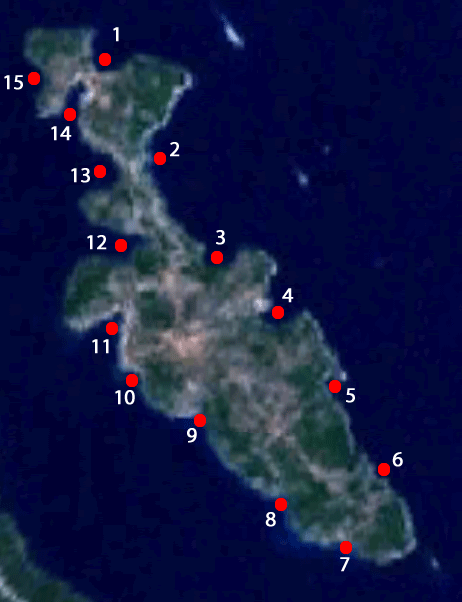
Satellite view with bays

Rava has a high shoreline to area ratio, with 15 bays:

1. Tanko
2. Vališina
3. Ivanoševica
4. Pavajsko
5. Pestehovac
6. Dražice
7. Golubovac
8. Martinica
9. Grbavač
10. Grbačina
11. Marnjica (Marinica)
12. Paladinjica (Paladinica)
13. Vićabok
14. Lokvina
15. Za Grbicu

== Gallery ==
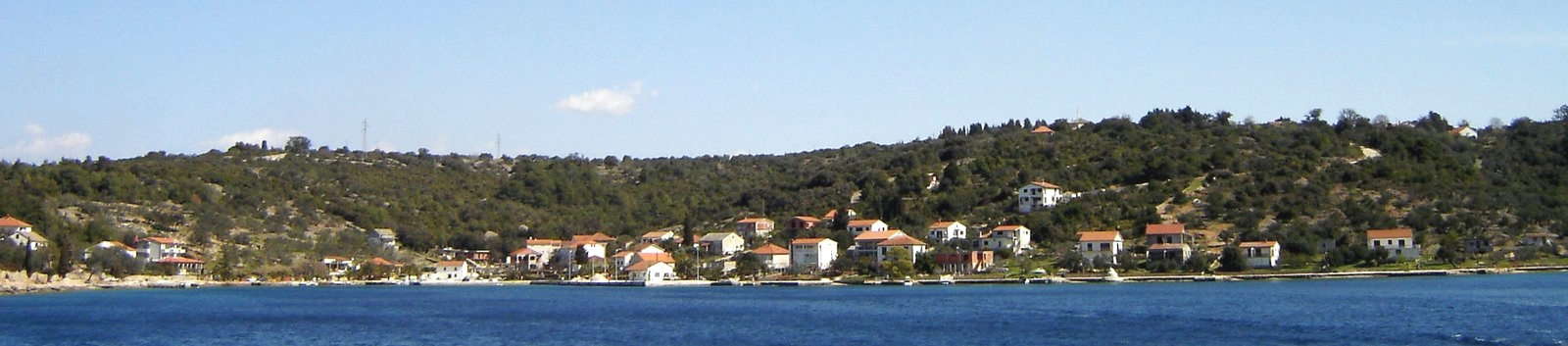
Marnjica from sea

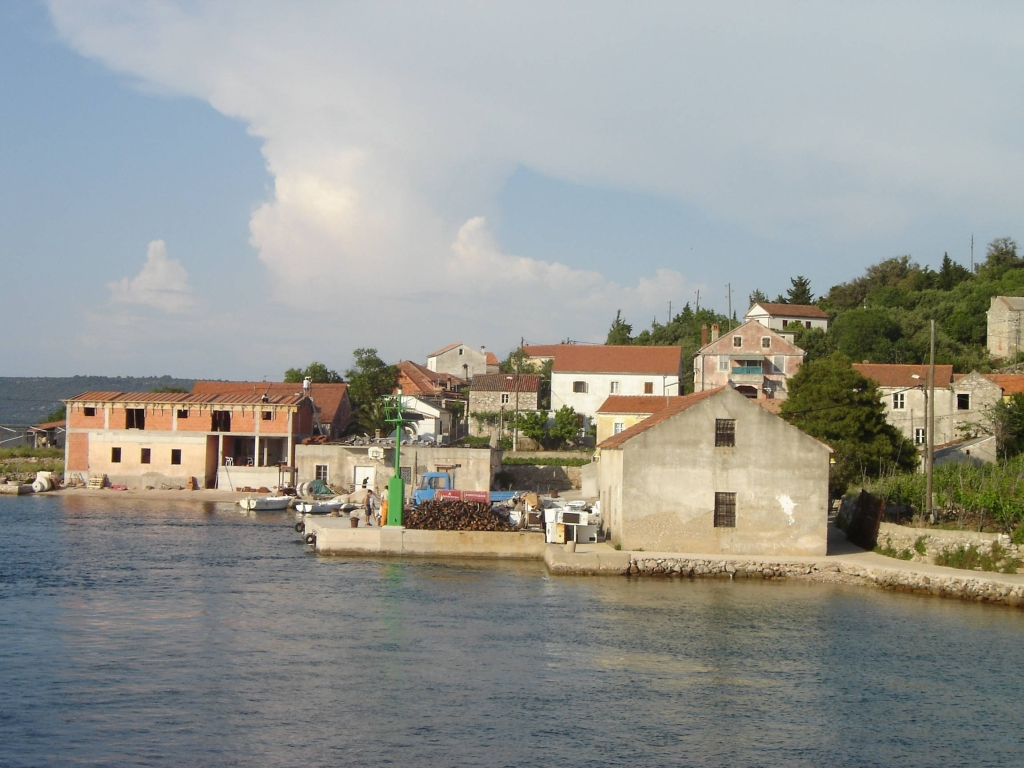
Mala Rava from Lokvina

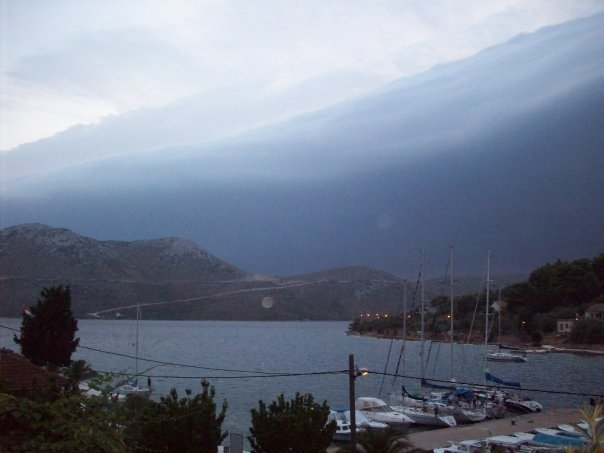
With approaching storm

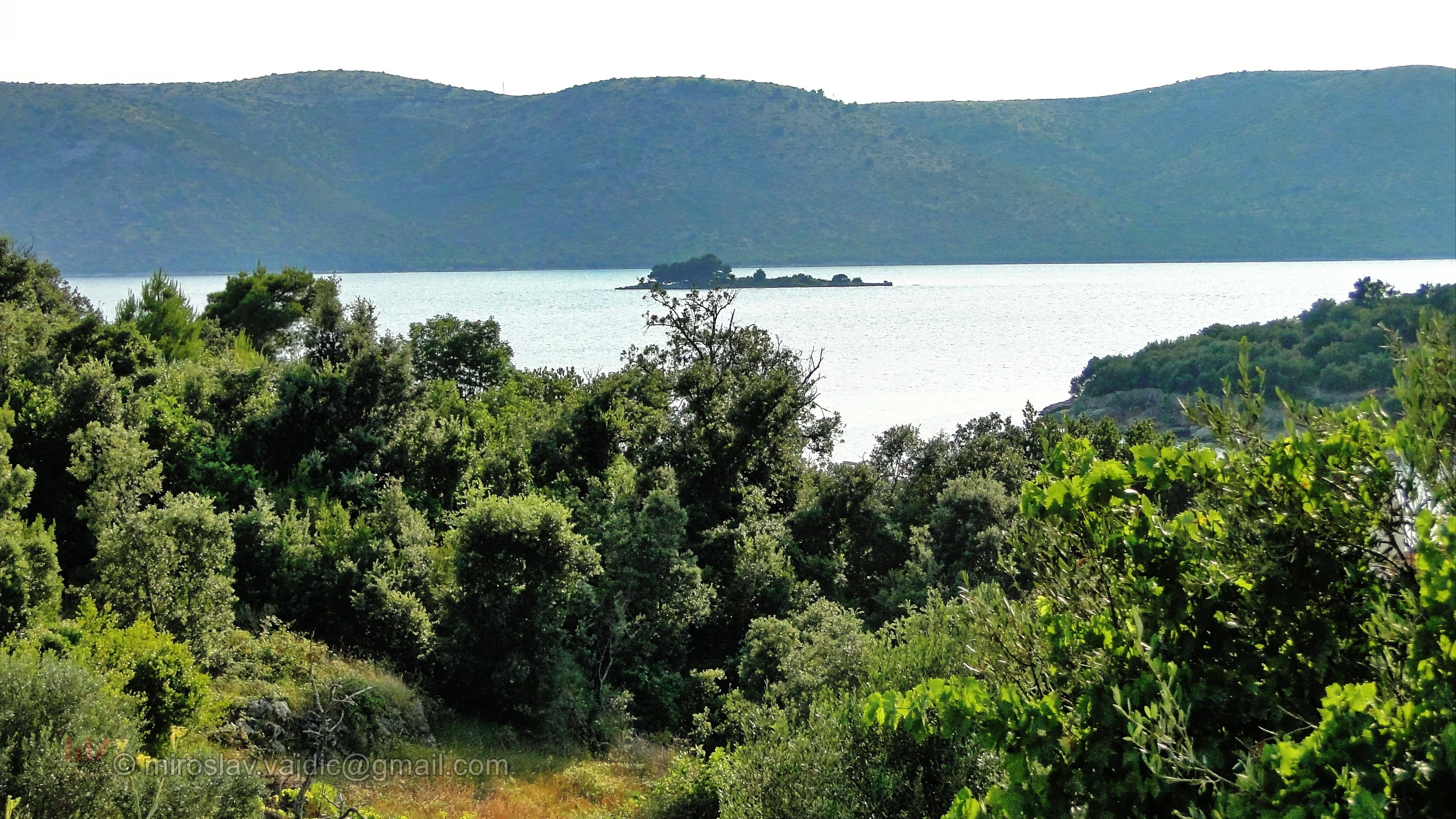
Ravski kanal
