= Sestrunj =

Coordinates: 44.150281°N 14.999363°E

Map

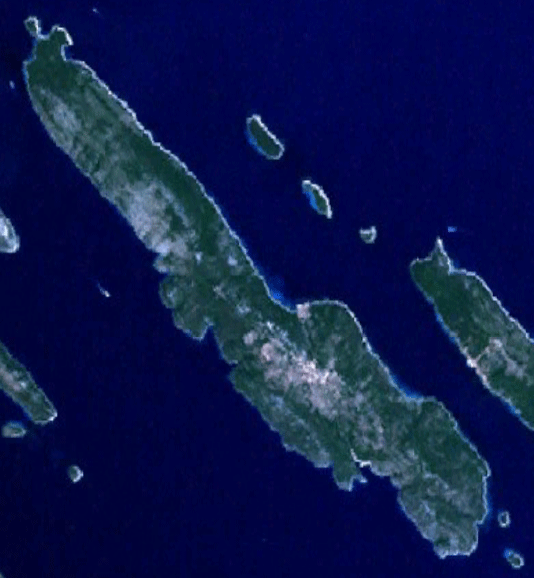
Satellite image of Sestrunj

Sestrunj is an island in the Croatian part of the Adriatic Sea. It is situated in Zadar Archipelago, between Ugljan, Rivanj and Dugi Otok. Its area is 15.1 square kilometres (5.8 square miles), and it has population of 48 (as of 2011). The only settlement is also called Sestrunj and is located in the island's interior. The island is partially covered with maquis shrubland and low forests. Remains of an Illyrian fort are situated on the island. The island's main industries are agriculture and fishing.

In prehistoric times, the island was inhabited by Illyrians, and the main attractions of the island are the church of St. Peter and Paul from the 16th century and the church of Our Lady of Health from 1602.
