= Rivanj =

Island of Croatia

Coordinates: 44.1529°N 15.0379°E

Map

Rivanj is an Adriatic Sea island in the Zadar Archipelago, between the islands of Sestrunj and Ugljan, with an area of 4.4 square kilometres (1.7 sq mi) (length 3.4 km (2.1 mi), width up to 1.4 km (0.9 mi)); population 31 (2011); highest peak Lukocina (112 metres (367 feet)). The only village is Rivanj, located in the interior of the island; below it, on the south-western coast, is a small harbour with a hamlet. The island is largely covered with underbrush and thicket. Rivanj has a daily ferry and ship line with Zadar. The present village was allegedly founded by the inhabitants of the island of Ugljan. Rivanj is frequented by boaters. There are only 2 family surnames in Rivanj, Radulić and Fatović, and there is a church of St. Jelena on the island.
