= Zverinac =

Island of Croatia

Coordinates: 44°9′50″N 14°55′0″E

Map

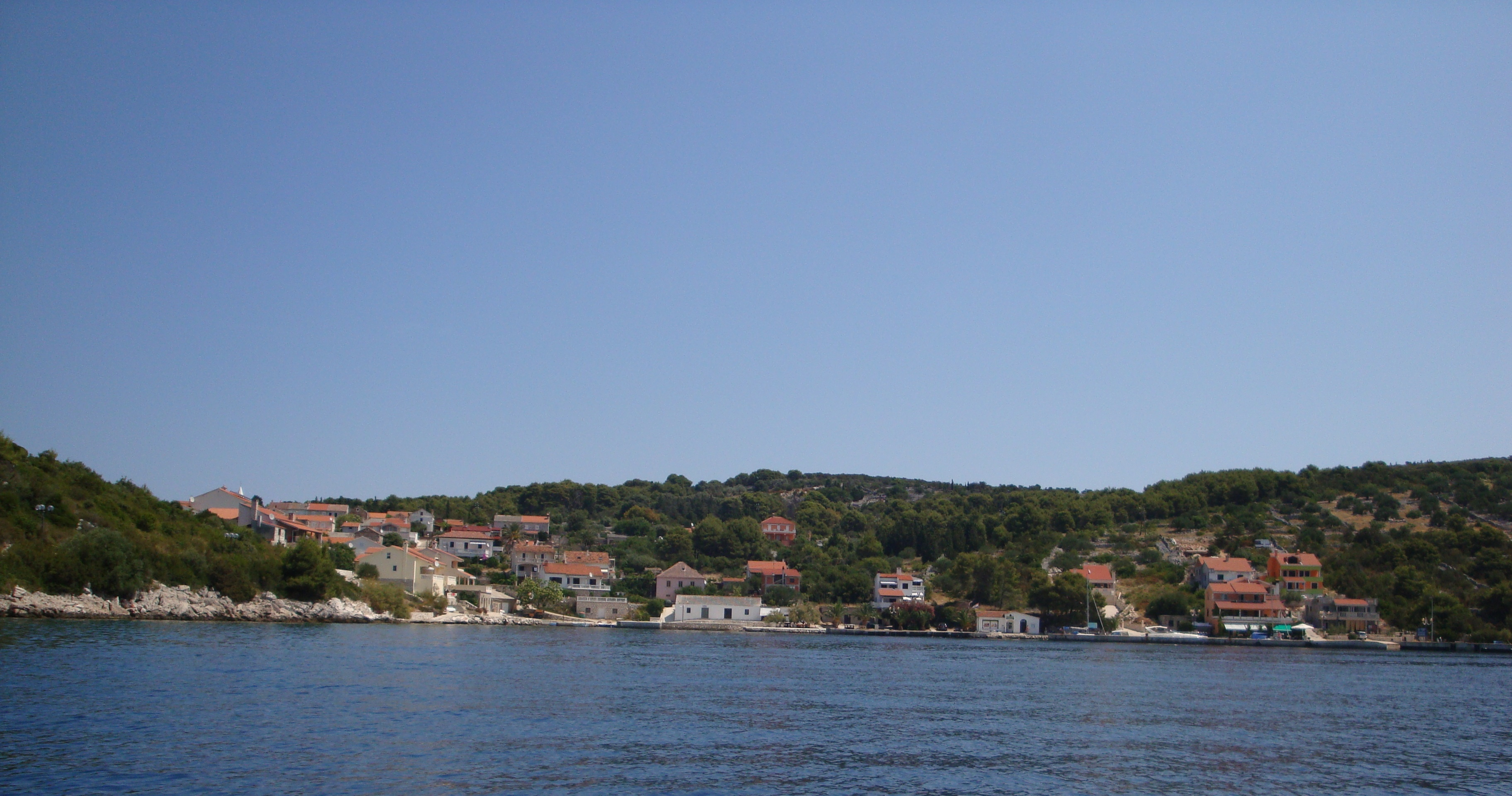
Zverinac Island, Croatia

Zverinac is a small Croatian island in the Zadar Archipelago of the Adriatic Sea. It occupies 4.2 km^{2} and is populated by 43 people, with a population density of 10.29 persons per square kilometer. Its highest peak is 111 metres high.

According to the Croatian Culturenet website, the island was first mentioned in 1421 as Suiran, a possession of the Zadar noblemen. In the island's settlement is the baroque palace of the family of Fanfong from 1746 . There are Roman ruins in the Poripišće uvala.
