= List of minor planets: 177001–178000 =

The following is a partial list of minor planets, running from minor-planet number 177001 through 178000, inclusive. The primary data for this and other partial lists is based on JPL's "Small-Body Orbital Elements" and data available from the Minor Planet Center. Critical list information is also provided by the MPC, unless otherwise specified from Lowell Observatory. A detailed description of the table's columns and additional sources are given on the main page including a complete list of every page in this series, and a statistical break-up on the dynamical classification of minor planets.

Also see the summary list of all named bodies in numerical and alphabetical order, and the corresponding naming citations for the number range of this particular list. New namings may only be added to this list after official publication, as the preannouncement of names is condemned by the Working Group for Small Bodies Nomenclature of the International Astronomical Union.

Near-Earth obj.	MBA (inner)	MBA (outer)	Centaur
Mars-crosser	MBA (middle)	Jupiter trojan	Trans-Neptunian obj.
Unclassified

== 177001–177100 ==
Designation			Discovery			Properties		Ref
Permanent	Provisional	Named after	Date	Site	Discoverer(s)	Category	Diam.	Ref
177001	2003 AH_{47}	—	January 5, 2003	Socorro	LINEAR	CLO	3.5 km	MPC · JPL
177002	2003 AG_{59}	—	January 5, 2003	Socorro	LINEAR	·	6.0 km	MPC · JPL
177003	2003 AC_{62}	—	January 7, 2003	Socorro	LINEAR	H	990 m	MPC · JPL
177004	2003 AA_{85}	—	January 7, 2003	Socorro	LINEAR	·	3.2 km	MPC · JPL
177005	2003 AV_{92}	—	January 14, 2003	Socorro	LINEAR	·	6.0 km	MPC · JPL
177006	2003 BO	—	January 24, 2003	Palomar	NEAT	·	5.9 km	MPC · JPL
177007	2003 BW_{1}	—	January 23, 2003	Kitt Peak	Spacewatch	·	4.2 km	MPC · JPL
177008	2003 BD_{7}	—	January 25, 2003	Anderson Mesa	LONEOS	·	3.8 km	MPC · JPL
177009	2003 BB_{8}	—	January 26, 2003	Kitt Peak	Spacewatch	·	2.7 km	MPC · JPL
177010	2003 BX_{10}	—	January 26, 2003	Anderson Mesa	LONEOS	·	5.3 km	MPC · JPL
177011	2003 BV_{19}	—	January 26, 2003	Anderson Mesa	LONEOS	·	4.3 km	MPC · JPL
177012	2003 BU_{24}	—	January 25, 2003	Palomar	NEAT	·	4.2 km	MPC · JPL
177013	2003 BE_{26}	—	January 26, 2003	Anderson Mesa	LONEOS	TEL	2.1 km	MPC · JPL
177014	2003 BZ_{29}	—	January 27, 2003	Palomar	NEAT	·	3.5 km	MPC · JPL
177015	2003 BL_{36}	—	January 26, 2003	Haleakala	NEAT	·	3.2 km	MPC · JPL
177016	2003 BM_{47}	—	January 31, 2003	Kitt Peak	Spacewatch	APO	360 m	MPC · JPL
177017	2003 BX_{48}	—	January 26, 2003	Haleakala	NEAT	·	4.0 km	MPC · JPL
177018	2003 BU_{50}	—	January 27, 2003	Socorro	LINEAR	·	3.6 km	MPC · JPL
177019	2003 BW_{57}	—	January 27, 2003	Socorro	LINEAR	·	2.3 km	MPC · JPL
177020	2003 BW_{61}	—	January 28, 2003	Socorro	LINEAR	·	6.8 km	MPC · JPL
177021	2003 BT_{65}	—	January 30, 2003	Socorro	LINEAR	·	4.7 km	MPC · JPL
177022	2003 BQ_{73}	—	January 29, 2003	Palomar	NEAT	·	2.5 km	MPC · JPL
177023	2003 BW_{79}	—	January 31, 2003	Socorro	LINEAR	EOS	2.8 km	MPC · JPL
177024	2003 BH_{80}	—	January 31, 2003	Anderson Mesa	LONEOS	H	830 m	MPC · JPL
177025	2003 BB_{82}	—	January 30, 2003	Anderson Mesa	LONEOS	·	2.6 km	MPC · JPL
177026	2003 BP_{82}	—	January 31, 2003	Socorro	LINEAR	·	3.8 km	MPC · JPL
177027	2003 BR_{84}	—	January 30, 2003	Haleakala	NEAT	·	4.3 km	MPC · JPL
177028	2003 BX_{84}	—	January 31, 2003	Socorro	LINEAR	·	2.5 km	MPC · JPL
177029	2003 BS_{90}	—	January 31, 2003	Socorro	LINEAR	·	4.6 km	MPC · JPL
177030	2003 BT_{90}	—	January 31, 2003	Socorro	LINEAR	·	3.1 km	MPC · JPL
177031	2003 BM_{92}	—	January 28, 2003	Socorro	LINEAR	·	3.1 km	MPC · JPL
177032	2003 CU_{1}	—	February 1, 2003	Socorro	LINEAR	NEM	4.8 km	MPC · JPL
177033	2003 CS_{3}	—	February 1, 2003	Socorro	LINEAR	·	5.4 km	MPC · JPL
177034	2003 CA_{5}	—	February 1, 2003	Socorro	LINEAR	EUN	2.3 km	MPC · JPL
177035	2003 CS_{6}	—	February 1, 2003	Socorro	LINEAR	·	6.8 km	MPC · JPL
177036	2003 CG_{21}	—	February 1, 2003	Kitt Peak	Spacewatch	·	2.1 km	MPC · JPL
177037	2003 CU_{21}	—	February 3, 2003	Anderson Mesa	LONEOS	·	3.4 km	MPC · JPL
177038	2003 CW_{25}	—	February 4, 2003	Kitt Peak	Spacewatch	HYG	4.6 km	MPC · JPL
177039	2003 DA_{5}	—	February 19, 2003	Palomar	NEAT	·	2.7 km	MPC · JPL
177040	2003 DQ_{6}	—	February 23, 2003	Campo Imperatore	CINEOS	H	730 m	MPC · JPL
177041	2003 DZ_{9}	—	February 23, 2003	Socorro	LINEAR	H	960 m	MPC · JPL
177042	2003 DV_{11}	—	February 25, 2003	Campo Imperatore	CINEOS	·	5.8 km	MPC · JPL
177043	2003 DL_{18}	—	February 19, 2003	Palomar	NEAT	·	2.9 km	MPC · JPL
177044	2003 DK_{22}	—	February 28, 2003	Haleakala	NEAT	·	2.3 km	MPC · JPL
177045	2003 DP_{24}	—	February 22, 2003	Palomar	NEAT	·	4.0 km	MPC · JPL
177046	2003 EK_{5}	—	March 5, 2003	Socorro	LINEAR	·	4.3 km	MPC · JPL
177047	2003 ES_{5}	—	March 5, 2003	Socorro	LINEAR	·	6.6 km	MPC · JPL
177048	2003 EX_{7}	—	March 6, 2003	Anderson Mesa	LONEOS	·	3.7 km	MPC · JPL
177049	2003 EE_{16}	—	March 8, 2003	Kitt Peak	Spacewatch	APO · PHA	390 m	MPC · JPL
177050	2003 EW_{19}	—	March 6, 2003	Anderson Mesa	LONEOS	·	3.3 km	MPC · JPL
177051	2003 EG_{21}	—	March 6, 2003	Anderson Mesa	LONEOS	EOS	3.0 km	MPC · JPL
177052	2003 EA_{24}	—	March 6, 2003	Socorro	LINEAR	·	3.6 km	MPC · JPL
177053	2003 EP_{26}	—	March 6, 2003	Anderson Mesa	LONEOS	·	3.1 km	MPC · JPL
177054	2003 EY_{35}	—	March 7, 2003	Anderson Mesa	LONEOS	·	4.0 km	MPC · JPL
177055	2003 EV_{39}	—	March 8, 2003	Socorro	LINEAR	·	4.4 km	MPC · JPL
177056	2003 EY_{41}	—	March 8, 2003	Socorro	LINEAR	·	3.6 km	MPC · JPL
177057	2003 EB_{46}	—	March 7, 2003	Socorro	LINEAR	·	6.2 km	MPC · JPL
177058	2003 EG_{52}	—	March 11, 2003	Palomar	NEAT	·	6.9 km	MPC · JPL
177059	2003 EJ_{52}	—	March 11, 2003	Palomar	NEAT	EOS	2.5 km	MPC · JPL
177060	2003 EG_{58}	—	March 11, 2003	Socorro	LINEAR	·	5.3 km	MPC · JPL
177061	2003 EA_{59}	—	March 12, 2003	Palomar	NEAT	EUP	7.6 km	MPC · JPL
177062	2003 FD_{3}	—	March 24, 2003	Socorro	LINEAR	H	850 m	MPC · JPL
177063	2003 FM_{3}	—	March 24, 2003	Socorro	LINEAR	H	800 m	MPC · JPL
177064	2003 FQ_{4}	—	March 26, 2003	Socorro	LINEAR	T_{j} (2.99) · EUP	8.5 km	MPC · JPL
177065 Samuelnoah	2003 FP_{7}	Samuelnoah	March 30, 2003	Wrightwood	J. W. Young	·	3.1 km	MPC · JPL
177066	2003 FE_{8}	—	March 30, 2003	Socorro	LINEAR	·	7.2 km	MPC · JPL
177067	2003 FG_{15}	—	March 23, 2003	Catalina	CSS	·	3.2 km	MPC · JPL
177068	2003 FC_{17}	—	March 24, 2003	Kitt Peak	Spacewatch	THM	2.8 km	MPC · JPL
177069	2003 FR_{19}	—	March 25, 2003	Palomar	NEAT	·	6.5 km	MPC · JPL
177070	2003 FN_{23}	—	March 23, 2003	Kitt Peak	Spacewatch	·	2.9 km	MPC · JPL
177071	2003 FS_{29}	—	March 25, 2003	Catalina	CSS	·	6.9 km	MPC · JPL
177072	2003 FN_{32}	—	March 23, 2003	Kitt Peak	Spacewatch	THM	3.4 km	MPC · JPL
177073	2003 FY_{33}	—	March 23, 2003	Kitt Peak	Spacewatch	·	2.3 km	MPC · JPL
177074	2003 FD_{34}	—	March 23, 2003	Kitt Peak	Spacewatch	·	5.1 km	MPC · JPL
177075	2003 FR_{36}	—	March 23, 2003	Kitt Peak	Spacewatch	·	2.8 km	MPC · JPL
177076	2003 FV_{42}	—	March 23, 2003	Catalina	CSS	·	3.4 km	MPC · JPL
177077	2003 FL_{45}	—	March 24, 2003	Kitt Peak	Spacewatch	·	2.4 km	MPC · JPL
177078	2003 FV_{45}	—	March 24, 2003	Kitt Peak	Spacewatch	·	4.0 km	MPC · JPL
177079	2003 FA_{47}	—	March 24, 2003	Kitt Peak	Spacewatch	·	3.9 km	MPC · JPL
177080	2003 FW_{49}	—	March 24, 2003	Haleakala	NEAT	·	4.6 km	MPC · JPL
177081	2003 FX_{52}	—	March 25, 2003	Palomar	NEAT	·	6.4 km	MPC · JPL
177082	2003 FT_{55}	—	March 26, 2003	Palomar	NEAT	·	5.7 km	MPC · JPL
177083	2003 FO_{56}	—	March 26, 2003	Palomar	NEAT	·	2.9 km	MPC · JPL
177084	2003 FZ_{56}	—	March 26, 2003	Palomar	NEAT	·	3.6 km	MPC · JPL
177085	2003 FU_{58}	—	March 26, 2003	Palomar	NEAT	EOS	4.3 km	MPC · JPL
177086	2003 FE_{69}	—	March 26, 2003	Palomar	NEAT	·	6.0 km	MPC · JPL
177087	2003 FY_{69}	—	March 26, 2003	Kitt Peak	Spacewatch	HYG	4.0 km	MPC · JPL
177088	2003 FN_{72}	—	March 26, 2003	Palomar	NEAT	·	5.0 km	MPC · JPL
177089	2003 FB_{73}	—	March 26, 2003	Haleakala	NEAT	·	4.9 km	MPC · JPL
177090	2003 FR_{73}	—	March 26, 2003	Palomar	NEAT	·	6.2 km	MPC · JPL
177091	2003 FX_{73}	—	March 26, 2003	Haleakala	NEAT	·	5.1 km	MPC · JPL
177092	2003 FD_{74}	—	March 26, 2003	Haleakala	NEAT	THB	5.9 km	MPC · JPL
177093	2003 FT_{77}	—	March 27, 2003	Palomar	NEAT	·	5.8 km	MPC · JPL
177094	2003 FA_{82}	—	March 27, 2003	Socorro	LINEAR	·	4.9 km	MPC · JPL
177095	2003 FT_{88}	—	March 28, 2003	Kitt Peak	Spacewatch	·	5.6 km	MPC · JPL
177096	2003 FP_{90}	—	March 29, 2003	Anderson Mesa	LONEOS	EOS	4.3 km	MPC · JPL
177097	2003 FO_{92}	—	March 29, 2003	Anderson Mesa	LONEOS	·	5.6 km	MPC · JPL
177098	2003 FL_{94}	—	March 29, 2003	Anderson Mesa	LONEOS	LIX	6.4 km	MPC · JPL
177099	2003 FW_{97}	—	March 30, 2003	Kitt Peak	Spacewatch	·	4.7 km	MPC · JPL
177100	2003 FZ_{98}	—	March 30, 2003	Socorro	LINEAR	·	4.1 km	MPC · JPL

== 177101–177200 ==
back to top

Designation			Discovery			Properties		Ref
Permanent	Provisional	Named after	Date	Site	Discoverer(s)	Category	Diam.	Ref
177101	2003 FW_{101}	—	March 31, 2003	Socorro	LINEAR	·	4.2 km	MPC · JPL
177102	2003 FT_{102}	—	March 31, 2003	Socorro	LINEAR	·	5.1 km	MPC · JPL
177103	2003 FT_{115}	—	March 31, 2003	Socorro	LINEAR	·	4.0 km	MPC · JPL
177104	2003 FC_{116}	—	March 31, 2003	Socorro	LINEAR	·	6.2 km	MPC · JPL
177105	2003 FM_{121}	—	March 25, 2003	Anderson Mesa	LONEOS	·	3.5 km	MPC · JPL
177106	2003 FC_{130}	—	March 24, 2003	Kitt Peak	Spacewatch	·	2.9 km	MPC · JPL
177107	2003 FM_{130}	—	March 24, 2003	Kitt Peak	Spacewatch	·	3.8 km	MPC · JPL
177108	2003 FC_{131}	—	March 22, 2003	Haleakala	NEAT	TIR	4.2 km	MPC · JPL
177109	2003 GZ_{2}	—	April 1, 2003	Socorro	LINEAR	·	6.1 km	MPC · JPL
177110	2003 GZ_{5}	—	April 1, 2003	Socorro	LINEAR	·	6.1 km	MPC · JPL
177111	2003 GN_{7}	—	April 1, 2003	Socorro	LINEAR	HYG	4.2 km	MPC · JPL
177112	2003 GU_{10}	—	April 3, 2003	Haleakala	NEAT	TIR	4.6 km	MPC · JPL
177113	2003 GF_{14}	—	April 1, 2003	Socorro	LINEAR	LIX	7.8 km	MPC · JPL
177114	2003 GL_{16}	—	April 2, 2003	Haleakala	NEAT	ARM	6.6 km	MPC · JPL
177115	2003 GP_{16}	—	April 3, 2003	Haleakala	NEAT	·	4.3 km	MPC · JPL
177116	2003 GJ_{27}	—	April 6, 2003	Kitt Peak	Spacewatch	·	4.2 km	MPC · JPL
177117	2003 GM_{27}	—	April 7, 2003	Kitt Peak	Spacewatch	·	3.3 km	MPC · JPL
177118	2003 GM_{37}	—	April 7, 2003	Socorro	LINEAR	EUP	7.6 km	MPC · JPL
177119	2003 GE_{47}	—	April 7, 2003	Kitt Peak	Spacewatch	·	2.4 km	MPC · JPL
177120 Ocampo Uría	2003 GZ_{51}	Ocampo Uría	April 1, 2003	Kitt Peak	M. W. Buie	·	3.0 km	MPC · JPL
177121	2003 GW_{55}	—	April 6, 2003	Kitt Peak	Spacewatch	·	6.2 km	MPC · JPL
177122	2003 HD_{3}	—	April 24, 2003	Anderson Mesa	LONEOS	·	4.3 km	MPC · JPL
177123	2003 HS_{5}	—	April 21, 2003	Kitt Peak	Spacewatch	·	4.4 km	MPC · JPL
177124	2003 HV_{9}	—	April 25, 2003	Kitt Peak	Spacewatch	·	5.3 km	MPC · JPL
177125	2003 HV_{10}	—	April 24, 2003	Kitt Peak	Spacewatch	·	3.6 km	MPC · JPL
177126	2003 HE_{12}	—	April 25, 2003	Campo Imperatore	CINEOS	·	4.9 km	MPC · JPL
177127	2003 HO_{20}	—	April 24, 2003	Anderson Mesa	LONEOS	·	6.1 km	MPC · JPL
177128	2003 HU_{24}	—	April 25, 2003	Kitt Peak	Spacewatch	·	3.5 km	MPC · JPL
177129	2003 HS_{31}	—	April 28, 2003	Kitt Peak	Spacewatch	·	5.5 km	MPC · JPL
177130	2003 HG_{43}	—	April 29, 2003	Anderson Mesa	LONEOS	·	4.5 km	MPC · JPL
177131	2003 HN_{51}	—	April 30, 2003	Kitt Peak	Spacewatch	·	3.5 km	MPC · JPL
177132	2003 HA_{54}	—	April 24, 2003	Kitt Peak	Spacewatch	·	5.5 km	MPC · JPL
177133	2003 JL_{3}	—	May 2, 2003	Kitt Peak	Spacewatch	·	2.9 km	MPC · JPL
177134	2003 JB_{14}	—	May 7, 2003	Catalina	CSS	·	4.0 km	MPC · JPL
177135	2003 KQ_{11}	—	May 25, 2003	Kitt Peak	Spacewatch	·	4.8 km	MPC · JPL
177136	2003 KK_{17}	—	May 26, 2003	Haleakala	NEAT	EOS	3.0 km	MPC · JPL
177137	2003 PB_{10}	—	August 4, 2003	Socorro	LINEAR	·	1.4 km	MPC · JPL
177138	2003 QE_{6}	—	August 18, 2003	Campo Imperatore	CINEOS	·	1.1 km	MPC · JPL
177139	2003 QC_{12}	—	August 22, 2003	Socorro	LINEAR	MAS	1.3 km	MPC · JPL
177140	2003 QQ_{35}	—	August 22, 2003	Palomar	NEAT	·	1.2 km	MPC · JPL
177141	2003 QC_{36}	—	August 22, 2003	Socorro	LINEAR	·	1.0 km	MPC · JPL
177142	2003 QT_{38}	—	August 22, 2003	Palomar	NEAT	·	1.1 km	MPC · JPL
177143	2003 QV_{54}	—	August 23, 2003	Socorro	LINEAR	·	1.2 km	MPC · JPL
177144	2003 QO_{61}	—	August 23, 2003	Socorro	LINEAR	·	1.3 km	MPC · JPL
177145	2003 QZ_{75}	—	August 24, 2003	Socorro	LINEAR	·	2.1 km	MPC · JPL
177146	2003 QO_{77}	—	August 24, 2003	Socorro	LINEAR	·	1.1 km	MPC · JPL
177147	2003 QM_{79}	—	August 25, 2003	Socorro	LINEAR	·	1.1 km	MPC · JPL
177148 Pätzold	2003 QJ_{85}	Pätzold	August 24, 2003	Cerro Tololo	M. W. Buie	·	1.0 km	MPC · JPL
177149	2003 QR_{95}	—	August 30, 2003	Haleakala	NEAT	·	1.7 km	MPC · JPL
177150	2003 RR	—	September 2, 2003	Socorro	LINEAR	·	1.0 km	MPC · JPL
177151	2003 RU_{8}	—	September 2, 2003	Socorro	LINEAR	PHO	1.8 km	MPC · JPL
177152	2003 RJ_{19}	—	September 15, 2003	Anderson Mesa	LONEOS	NYS	1.1 km	MPC · JPL
177153	2003 SW_{11}	—	September 16, 2003	Kitt Peak	Spacewatch	·	1.1 km	MPC · JPL
177154	2003 SH_{16}	—	September 17, 2003	Goodricke-Pigott	R. A. Tucker	·	1.3 km	MPC · JPL
177155	2003 SE_{23}	—	September 16, 2003	Kitt Peak	Spacewatch	·	1.2 km	MPC · JPL
177156	2003 SL_{31}	—	September 18, 2003	Kitt Peak	Spacewatch	·	780 m	MPC · JPL
177157 Skoffelza	2003 SF_{33}	Skoffelza	September 18, 2003	Piszkéstető	K. Sárneczky, B. Sipőcz	·	1.3 km	MPC · JPL
177158	2003 SN_{39}	—	September 16, 2003	Palomar	NEAT	(2076)	1.1 km	MPC · JPL
177159	2003 SD_{47}	—	September 16, 2003	Anderson Mesa	LONEOS	·	1.3 km	MPC · JPL
177160	2003 SU_{83}	—	September 18, 2003	Palomar	NEAT	·	1.3 km	MPC · JPL
177161	2003 SG_{84}	—	September 20, 2003	Haleakala	NEAT	·	1.0 km	MPC · JPL
177162	2003 SC_{97}	—	September 19, 2003	Socorro	LINEAR	·	1.1 km	MPC · JPL
177163	2003 SN_{110}	—	September 20, 2003	Palomar	NEAT	·	2.1 km	MPC · JPL
177164	2003 ST_{125}	—	September 19, 2003	Socorro	LINEAR	·	1.2 km	MPC · JPL
177165	2003 SD_{128}	—	September 20, 2003	Socorro	LINEAR	·	1.2 km	MPC · JPL
177166	2003 SJ_{128}	—	September 20, 2003	Socorro	LINEAR	·	1 km	MPC · JPL
177167	2003 SL_{131}	—	September 20, 2003	Socorro	LINEAR	·	1.4 km	MPC · JPL
177168	2003 SX_{138}	—	September 20, 2003	Palomar	NEAT	V	1.3 km	MPC · JPL
177169	2003 SC_{144}	—	September 21, 2003	Haleakala	NEAT	·	950 m	MPC · JPL
177170	2003 SL_{145}	—	September 20, 2003	Palomar	NEAT	V	1.1 km	MPC · JPL
177171	2003 SE_{146}	—	September 20, 2003	Haleakala	NEAT	·	1.5 km	MPC · JPL
177172	2003 SK_{147}	—	September 20, 2003	Palomar	NEAT	EUN	1.9 km	MPC · JPL
177173	2003 SP_{164}	—	September 20, 2003	Anderson Mesa	LONEOS	·	1.1 km	MPC · JPL
177174	2003 SM_{169}	—	September 23, 2003	Haleakala	NEAT	·	1.3 km	MPC · JPL
177175	2003 SM_{170}	—	September 21, 2003	Uccle	T. Pauwels	·	1.3 km	MPC · JPL
177176	2003 SY_{174}	—	September 18, 2003	Kitt Peak	Spacewatch	·	1.1 km	MPC · JPL
177177	2003 SG_{204}	—	September 22, 2003	Socorro	LINEAR	·	2.3 km	MPC · JPL
177178	2003 SD_{218}	—	September 27, 2003	Kitt Peak	Spacewatch	·	1.0 km	MPC · JPL
177179	2003 SF_{224}	—	September 25, 2003	Bergisch Gladbach	W. Bickel	·	1.2 km	MPC · JPL
177180	2003 SQ_{245}	—	September 26, 2003	Socorro	LINEAR	·	830 m	MPC · JPL
177181	2003 SE_{248}	—	September 26, 2003	Socorro	LINEAR	·	890 m	MPC · JPL
177182	2003 SU_{249}	—	September 26, 2003	Socorro	LINEAR	NYS	3.2 km	MPC · JPL
177183	2003 ST_{263}	—	September 28, 2003	Socorro	LINEAR	·	1.7 km	MPC · JPL
177184	2003 SU_{290}	—	September 28, 2003	Kitt Peak	Spacewatch	·	1 km	MPC · JPL
177185	2003 TT_{8}	—	October 3, 2003	Kitt Peak	Spacewatch	·	1.4 km	MPC · JPL
177186	2003 TZ_{16}	—	October 14, 2003	Anderson Mesa	LONEOS	·	880 m	MPC · JPL
177187	2003 TQ_{18}	—	October 15, 2003	Anderson Mesa	LONEOS	·	1.2 km	MPC · JPL
177188	2003 UR_{1}	—	October 16, 2003	Kitt Peak	Spacewatch	·	1.1 km	MPC · JPL
177189	2003 UW_{4}	—	October 17, 2003	Socorro	LINEAR	·	1.8 km	MPC · JPL
177190	2003 UA_{8}	—	October 19, 2003	Kitt Peak	Spacewatch	·	760 m	MPC · JPL
177191	2003 UD_{10}	—	October 20, 2003	Emerald Lane	L. Ball	·	1.1 km	MPC · JPL
177192	2003 UC_{15}	—	October 16, 2003	Kitt Peak	Spacewatch	·	1.6 km	MPC · JPL
177193	2003 UO_{15}	—	October 16, 2003	Anderson Mesa	LONEOS	·	1.2 km	MPC · JPL
177194	2003 UZ_{16}	—	October 17, 2003	Črni Vrh	Mikuž, H.	·	1.6 km	MPC · JPL
177195	2003 UL_{29}	—	October 23, 2003	Kvistaberg	Uppsala-DLR Asteroid Survey	(5)	1.7 km	MPC · JPL
177196	2003 UC_{38}	—	October 17, 2003	Kitt Peak	Spacewatch	·	1.1 km	MPC · JPL
177197	2003 UV_{38}	—	October 16, 2003	Uccle	T. Pauwels	NYS	1.6 km	MPC · JPL
177198	2003 UB_{49}	—	October 16, 2003	Anderson Mesa	LONEOS	NYS ·	1.8 km	MPC · JPL
177199	2003 UD_{54}	—	October 18, 2003	Palomar	NEAT	V	880 m	MPC · JPL
177200	2003 UL_{86}	—	October 18, 2003	Palomar	NEAT	·	1.4 km	MPC · JPL

== 177201–177300 ==
back to top

Designation			Discovery			Properties		Ref
Permanent	Provisional	Named after	Date	Site	Discoverer(s)	Category	Diam.	Ref
177201	2003 UZ_{86}	—	October 18, 2003	Palomar	NEAT	·	1.2 km	MPC · JPL
177202	2003 UJ_{91}	—	October 20, 2003	Socorro	LINEAR	·	1.1 km	MPC · JPL
177203	2003 UF_{92}	—	October 20, 2003	Palomar	NEAT	(883)	1.4 km	MPC · JPL
177204	2003 UP_{96}	—	October 18, 2003	Palomar	NEAT	(2076)	1.2 km	MPC · JPL
177205	2003 UU_{98}	—	October 19, 2003	Kitt Peak	Spacewatch	NYS	2.7 km	MPC · JPL
177206	2003 US_{103}	—	October 20, 2003	Kitt Peak	Spacewatch	NYS	1.9 km	MPC · JPL
177207	2003 UQ_{105}	—	October 18, 2003	Kitt Peak	Spacewatch	·	1.5 km	MPC · JPL
177208	2003 UK_{109}	—	October 19, 2003	Kitt Peak	Spacewatch	·	1.1 km	MPC · JPL
177209	2003 UD_{117}	—	October 21, 2003	Socorro	LINEAR	·	1.4 km	MPC · JPL
177210	2003 UE_{134}	—	October 20, 2003	Palomar	NEAT	·	1.2 km	MPC · JPL
177211	2003 UZ_{140}	—	October 17, 2003	Campo Imperatore	CINEOS	·	1.5 km	MPC · JPL
177212	2003 UN_{145}	—	October 18, 2003	Anderson Mesa	LONEOS	(5)	3.4 km	MPC · JPL
177213	2003 UT_{147}	—	October 18, 2003	Kitt Peak	Spacewatch	·	1.3 km	MPC · JPL
177214	2003 UX_{154}	—	October 20, 2003	Kitt Peak	Spacewatch	·	1.4 km	MPC · JPL
177215	2003 UO_{159}	—	October 20, 2003	Kitt Peak	Spacewatch	NYS	1.4 km	MPC · JPL
177216	2003 UX_{164}	—	October 21, 2003	Palomar	NEAT	·	1.3 km	MPC · JPL
177217	2003 UA_{173}	—	October 20, 2003	Palomar	NEAT	·	930 m	MPC · JPL
177218	2003 UL_{174}	—	October 21, 2003	Palomar	NEAT	·	910 m	MPC · JPL
177219	2003 UO_{175}	—	October 21, 2003	Anderson Mesa	LONEOS	V	1.1 km	MPC · JPL
177220	2003 UN_{188}	—	October 22, 2003	Socorro	LINEAR	·	1.4 km	MPC · JPL
177221	2003 UW_{196}	—	October 21, 2003	Kitt Peak	Spacewatch	·	1.6 km	MPC · JPL
177222	2003 UJ_{208}	—	October 22, 2003	Kitt Peak	Spacewatch	·	1.0 km	MPC · JPL
177223	2003 UT_{208}	—	October 22, 2003	Kitt Peak	Spacewatch	·	890 m	MPC · JPL
177224	2003 UL_{218}	—	October 21, 2003	Socorro	LINEAR	·	1.0 km	MPC · JPL
177225	2003 UN_{218}	—	October 21, 2003	Socorro	LINEAR	NYS ·	3.5 km	MPC · JPL
177226	2003 UE_{224}	—	October 22, 2003	Socorro	LINEAR	·	990 m	MPC · JPL
177227	2003 UV_{232}	—	October 24, 2003	Socorro	LINEAR	·	1 km	MPC · JPL
177228	2003 UB_{234}	—	October 24, 2003	Socorro	LINEAR	·	1.3 km	MPC · JPL
177229	2003 UL_{236}	—	October 22, 2003	Haleakala	NEAT	·	990 m	MPC · JPL
177230	2003 UQ_{243}	—	October 24, 2003	Socorro	LINEAR	·	1.7 km	MPC · JPL
177231	2003 UE_{246}	—	October 24, 2003	Socorro	LINEAR	·	1.6 km	MPC · JPL
177232	2003 UY_{250}	—	October 25, 2003	Socorro	LINEAR	·	1.2 km	MPC · JPL
177233	2003 UC_{252}	—	October 26, 2003	Catalina	CSS	·	1.2 km	MPC · JPL
177234	2003 UU_{252}	—	October 26, 2003	Kitt Peak	Spacewatch	·	2.2 km	MPC · JPL
177235	2003 UK_{259}	—	October 25, 2003	Socorro	LINEAR	·	1.4 km	MPC · JPL
177236	2003 UV_{265}	—	October 27, 2003	Haleakala	NEAT	·	1.2 km	MPC · JPL
177237	2003 UH_{266}	—	October 28, 2003	Socorro	LINEAR	·	1.4 km	MPC · JPL
177238	2003 UK_{267}	—	October 28, 2003	Socorro	LINEAR	·	1.6 km	MPC · JPL
177239	2003 UK_{269}	—	October 29, 2003	Socorro	LINEAR	·	1.3 km	MPC · JPL
177240	2003 UP_{269}	—	October 29, 2003	Socorro	LINEAR	·	1 km	MPC · JPL
177241	2003 UF_{276}	—	October 29, 2003	Catalina	CSS	(5)	1.7 km	MPC · JPL
177242	2003 UR_{276}	—	October 30, 2003	Socorro	LINEAR	·	1.3 km	MPC · JPL
177243	2003 UH_{281}	—	October 28, 2003	Socorro	LINEAR	·	1.0 km	MPC · JPL
177244	2003 VA_{1}	—	November 5, 2003	Socorro	LINEAR	PHO	1.8 km	MPC · JPL
177245	2003 WB	—	November 17, 2003	Wrightwood	J. W. Young	EUN	2.1 km	MPC · JPL
177246	2003 WZ_{6}	—	November 18, 2003	Palomar	NEAT	·	1.2 km	MPC · JPL
177247	2003 WY_{8}	—	November 16, 2003	Kitt Peak	Spacewatch	·	980 m	MPC · JPL
177248	2003 WC_{10}	—	November 18, 2003	Kitt Peak	Spacewatch	·	1.4 km	MPC · JPL
177249	2003 WL_{11}	—	November 18, 2003	Palomar	NEAT	V	950 m	MPC · JPL
177250	2003 WP_{11}	—	November 18, 2003	Palomar	NEAT	·	1.7 km	MPC · JPL
177251	2003 WD_{12}	—	November 18, 2003	Palomar	NEAT	·	1.4 km	MPC · JPL
177252	2003 WX_{14}	—	November 16, 2003	Kitt Peak	Spacewatch	·	1.2 km	MPC · JPL
177253	2003 WL_{18}	—	November 19, 2003	Socorro	LINEAR	·	2.0 km	MPC · JPL
177254	2003 WM_{18}	—	November 19, 2003	Socorro	LINEAR	·	1.5 km	MPC · JPL
177255	2003 WC_{25}	—	November 20, 2003	Socorro	LINEAR	AMO +1km	1.6 km	MPC · JPL
177256	2003 WA_{30}	—	November 18, 2003	Kitt Peak	Spacewatch	·	1.5 km	MPC · JPL
177257	2003 WP_{32}	—	November 18, 2003	Kitt Peak	Spacewatch	·	1.1 km	MPC · JPL
177258	2003 WX_{39}	—	November 19, 2003	Kitt Peak	Spacewatch	·	2.5 km	MPC · JPL
177259	2003 WT_{55}	—	November 20, 2003	Socorro	LINEAR	·	2.9 km	MPC · JPL
177260	2003 WM_{56}	—	November 20, 2003	Socorro	LINEAR	·	1.3 km	MPC · JPL
177261	2003 WF_{57}	—	November 18, 2003	Palomar	NEAT	·	1.4 km	MPC · JPL
177262	2003 WA_{58}	—	November 18, 2003	Kitt Peak	Spacewatch	·	2.5 km	MPC · JPL
177263	2003 WY_{59}	—	November 18, 2003	Palomar	NEAT	·	1.6 km	MPC · JPL
177264	2003 WQ_{64}	—	November 19, 2003	Kitt Peak	Spacewatch	·	1.6 km	MPC · JPL
177265	2003 WX_{75}	—	November 19, 2003	Socorro	LINEAR	·	1.0 km	MPC · JPL
177266	2003 WK_{88}	—	November 24, 2003	Socorro	LINEAR	·	1.5 km	MPC · JPL
177267	2003 WM_{92}	—	November 18, 2003	Palomar	NEAT	·	1.8 km	MPC · JPL
177268	2003 WF_{95}	—	November 19, 2003	Anderson Mesa	LONEOS	V	950 m	MPC · JPL
177269	2003 WV_{101}	—	November 21, 2003	Socorro	LINEAR	·	1.2 km	MPC · JPL
177270	2003 WB_{114}	—	November 20, 2003	Socorro	LINEAR	·	1.8 km	MPC · JPL
177271	2003 WJ_{117}	—	November 20, 2003	Socorro	LINEAR	·	2.0 km	MPC · JPL
177272	2003 WO_{122}	—	November 20, 2003	Socorro	LINEAR	·	1.1 km	MPC · JPL
177273	2003 WW_{126}	—	November 20, 2003	Socorro	LINEAR	·	1.4 km	MPC · JPL
177274	2003 WM_{129}	—	November 21, 2003	Socorro	LINEAR	·	1.4 km	MPC · JPL
177275	2003 WH_{132}	—	November 19, 2003	Kitt Peak	Spacewatch	(5)	1.6 km	MPC · JPL
177276	2003 WB_{135}	—	November 21, 2003	Socorro	LINEAR	·	2.1 km	MPC · JPL
177277	2003 WN_{135}	—	November 21, 2003	Socorro	LINEAR	EUN	1.9 km	MPC · JPL
177278	2003 WR_{138}	—	November 21, 2003	Socorro	LINEAR	·	1.5 km	MPC · JPL
177279	2003 WD_{142}	—	November 21, 2003	Socorro	LINEAR	·	1.7 km	MPC · JPL
177280	2003 WY_{142}	—	November 23, 2003	Socorro	LINEAR	·	2.7 km	MPC · JPL
177281	2003 WE_{149}	—	November 24, 2003	Socorro	LINEAR	·	1.8 km	MPC · JPL
177282	2003 WQ_{151}	—	November 28, 2003	Sandlot	G. Hug	NYS	1.8 km	MPC · JPL
177283	2003 WG_{152}	—	November 28, 2003	Kitt Peak	Spacewatch	(2076)	910 m	MPC · JPL
177284	2003 WS_{152}	—	November 26, 2003	Socorro	LINEAR	PHO	1.9 km	MPC · JPL
177285	2003 WE_{155}	—	November 26, 2003	Kitt Peak	Spacewatch	·	1.5 km	MPC · JPL
177286	2003 WX_{162}	—	November 30, 2003	Kitt Peak	Spacewatch	·	1.4 km	MPC · JPL
177287	2003 WF_{166}	—	November 20, 2003	Socorro	LINEAR	slow	1.2 km	MPC · JPL
177288	2003 XF	—	December 3, 2003	Socorro	LINEAR	·	1.9 km	MPC · JPL
177289	2003 XA_{1}	—	December 1, 2003	Kitt Peak	Spacewatch	V	880 m	MPC · JPL
177290	2003 XD_{1}	—	December 1, 2003	Kitt Peak	Spacewatch	·	1.6 km	MPC · JPL
177291	2003 XR_{6}	—	December 3, 2003	Socorro	LINEAR	NYS	1.8 km	MPC · JPL
177292	2003 XA_{12}	—	December 14, 2003	Socorro	LINEAR	·	3.0 km	MPC · JPL
177293	2003 XM_{12}	—	December 14, 2003	Palomar	NEAT	·	2.8 km	MPC · JPL
177294	2003 XO_{17}	—	December 15, 2003	Kitt Peak	Spacewatch	·	3.5 km	MPC · JPL
177295	2003 XX_{17}	—	December 14, 2003	Kitt Peak	Spacewatch	·	1.9 km	MPC · JPL
177296	2003 XK_{19}	—	December 15, 2003	Socorro	LINEAR	PHO	3.8 km	MPC · JPL
177297	2003 XD_{28}	—	December 1, 2003	Kitt Peak	Spacewatch	·	1.4 km	MPC · JPL
177298	2003 XP_{30}	—	December 1, 2003	Kitt Peak	Spacewatch	·	1.1 km	MPC · JPL
177299	2003 YB_{1}	—	December 17, 2003	Socorro	LINEAR	·	1.5 km	MPC · JPL
177300	2003 YH_{4}	—	December 16, 2003	Catalina	CSS	·	1.3 km	MPC · JPL

== 177301–177400 ==
back to top

Designation			Discovery			Properties		Ref
Permanent	Provisional	Named after	Date	Site	Discoverer(s)	Category	Diam.	Ref
177301	2003 YA_{5}	—	December 16, 2003	Catalina	CSS	(2076)	970 m	MPC · JPL
177302	2003 YB_{7}	—	December 17, 2003	Socorro	LINEAR	·	2.3 km	MPC · JPL
177303	2003 YG_{7}	—	December 17, 2003	Kitt Peak	Spacewatch	NYS	1.8 km	MPC · JPL
177304	2003 YZ_{12}	—	December 17, 2003	Anderson Mesa	LONEOS	·	1.6 km	MPC · JPL
177305	2003 YW_{14}	—	December 17, 2003	Socorro	LINEAR	·	1.6 km	MPC · JPL
177306	2003 YE_{15}	—	December 17, 2003	Socorro	LINEAR	·	1.7 km	MPC · JPL
177307	2003 YC_{18}	—	December 16, 2003	Anderson Mesa	LONEOS	·	2.5 km	MPC · JPL
177308	2003 YR_{19}	—	December 17, 2003	Kitt Peak	Spacewatch	·	2.4 km	MPC · JPL
177309	2003 YX_{19}	—	December 17, 2003	Kitt Peak	Spacewatch	·	1.3 km	MPC · JPL
177310	2003 YD_{22}	—	December 18, 2003	Socorro	LINEAR	·	1.4 km	MPC · JPL
177311	2003 YS_{29}	—	December 17, 2003	Kitt Peak	Spacewatch	NYS	2.2 km	MPC · JPL
177312	2003 YC_{32}	—	December 18, 2003	Socorro	LINEAR	V	1.1 km	MPC · JPL
177313	2003 YT_{32}	—	December 16, 2003	Kitt Peak	Spacewatch	·	1.5 km	MPC · JPL
177314	2003 YE_{33}	—	December 16, 2003	Catalina	CSS	·	1.4 km	MPC · JPL
177315	2003 YO_{33}	—	December 17, 2003	Catalina	CSS	·	1.6 km	MPC · JPL
177316	2003 YY_{34}	—	December 18, 2003	Socorro	LINEAR	·	2.1 km	MPC · JPL
177317	2003 YW_{35}	—	December 19, 2003	Socorro	LINEAR	·	4.2 km	MPC · JPL
177318	2003 YR_{36}	—	December 17, 2003	Palomar	NEAT	·	2.3 km	MPC · JPL
177319	2003 YS_{41}	—	December 19, 2003	Kitt Peak	Spacewatch	MAS	1.0 km	MPC · JPL
177320	2003 YG_{42}	—	December 19, 2003	Kitt Peak	Spacewatch	·	1.7 km	MPC · JPL
177321	2003 YT_{43}	—	December 19, 2003	Socorro	LINEAR	·	2.2 km	MPC · JPL
177322	2003 YX_{43}	—	December 19, 2003	Kitt Peak	Spacewatch	·	2.1 km	MPC · JPL
177323	2003 YO_{48}	—	December 18, 2003	Socorro	LINEAR	·	2.0 km	MPC · JPL
177324	2003 YR_{48}	—	December 18, 2003	Socorro	LINEAR	MAR	3.1 km	MPC · JPL
177325	2003 YJ_{49}	—	December 18, 2003	Socorro	LINEAR	·	1.4 km	MPC · JPL
177326	2003 YN_{57}	—	December 19, 2003	Socorro	LINEAR	EUN	2.1 km	MPC · JPL
177327	2003 YX_{57}	—	December 19, 2003	Socorro	LINEAR	·	1.4 km	MPC · JPL
177328	2003 YC_{61}	—	December 19, 2003	Socorro	LINEAR	·	1.2 km	MPC · JPL
177329	2003 YP_{62}	—	December 19, 2003	Socorro	LINEAR	·	2.2 km	MPC · JPL
177330	2003 YR_{66}	—	December 20, 2003	Socorro	LINEAR	·	4.3 km	MPC · JPL
177331	2003 YJ_{70}	—	December 21, 2003	Haleakala	NEAT	HNS	2.0 km	MPC · JPL
177332	2003 YL_{70}	—	December 21, 2003	Catalina	CSS	·	2.3 km	MPC · JPL
177333	2003 YH_{77}	—	December 18, 2003	Socorro	LINEAR	MAS	830 m	MPC · JPL
177334	2003 YW_{78}	—	December 18, 2003	Socorro	LINEAR	·	2.7 km	MPC · JPL
177335	2003 YZ_{87}	—	December 19, 2003	Socorro	LINEAR	·	1.5 km	MPC · JPL
177336	2003 YS_{99}	—	December 19, 2003	Socorro	LINEAR	·	1.8 km	MPC · JPL
177337	2003 YG_{100}	—	December 19, 2003	Socorro	LINEAR	·	2.0 km	MPC · JPL
177338	2003 YN_{106}	—	December 22, 2003	Kitt Peak	Spacewatch	·	1.8 km	MPC · JPL
177339	2003 YK_{114}	—	December 25, 2003	Haleakala	NEAT	·	3.2 km	MPC · JPL
177340	2003 YO_{120}	—	December 27, 2003	Socorro	LINEAR	·	2.1 km	MPC · JPL
177341	2003 YF_{123}	—	December 27, 2003	Socorro	LINEAR	RAF	1.6 km	MPC · JPL
177342	2003 YX_{127}	—	December 27, 2003	Socorro	LINEAR	·	3.5 km	MPC · JPL
177343	2003 YA_{128}	—	December 27, 2003	Socorro	LINEAR	·	2.1 km	MPC · JPL
177344	2003 YN_{128}	—	December 27, 2003	Socorro	LINEAR	·	2.1 km	MPC · JPL
177345	2003 YO_{128}	—	December 27, 2003	Socorro	LINEAR	·	2.2 km	MPC · JPL
177346	2003 YG_{130}	—	December 27, 2003	Socorro	LINEAR	GEF	2.3 km	MPC · JPL
177347	2003 YP_{133}	—	December 28, 2003	Socorro	LINEAR	·	1.8 km	MPC · JPL
177348	2003 YP_{137}	—	December 27, 2003	Socorro	LINEAR	·	1.9 km	MPC · JPL
177349	2003 YH_{138}	—	December 27, 2003	Socorro	LINEAR	·	1.8 km	MPC · JPL
177350	2003 YA_{145}	—	December 28, 2003	Socorro	LINEAR	·	3.9 km	MPC · JPL
177351	2003 YV_{149}	—	December 29, 2003	Socorro	LINEAR	·	1.7 km	MPC · JPL
177352	2003 YL_{157}	—	December 16, 2003	Kitt Peak	Spacewatch	V	1.1 km	MPC · JPL
177353	2003 YJ_{161}	—	December 17, 2003	Socorro	LINEAR	·	1.7 km	MPC · JPL
177354	2003 YH_{180}	—	December 18, 2003	Kitt Peak	Spacewatch	·	2.0 km	MPC · JPL
177355	2004 AP_{1}	—	January 12, 2004	Palomar	NEAT	·	1.9 km	MPC · JPL
177356	2004 AV_{3}	—	January 13, 2004	Anderson Mesa	LONEOS	·	2.6 km	MPC · JPL
177357	2004 AM_{5}	—	January 13, 2004	Anderson Mesa	LONEOS	·	2.1 km	MPC · JPL
177358	2004 AA_{10}	—	January 15, 2004	Kitt Peak	Spacewatch	·	1.3 km	MPC · JPL
177359	2004 BT_{3}	—	January 16, 2004	Palomar	NEAT	MAS	1.1 km	MPC · JPL
177360	2004 BU_{4}	—	January 16, 2004	Palomar	NEAT	NYS	2.1 km	MPC · JPL
177361	2004 BW_{5}	—	January 16, 2004	Kitt Peak	Spacewatch	NYS	1.6 km	MPC · JPL
177362	2004 BZ_{5}	—	January 16, 2004	Kitt Peak	Spacewatch	·	1.6 km	MPC · JPL
177363	2004 BS_{11}	—	January 16, 2004	Palomar	NEAT	PHO	1.3 km	MPC · JPL
177364	2004 BF_{15}	—	January 16, 2004	Kitt Peak	Spacewatch	·	1.7 km	MPC · JPL
177365	2004 BM_{15}	—	January 16, 2004	Kitt Peak	Spacewatch	·	1.9 km	MPC · JPL
177366	2004 BM_{19}	—	January 17, 2004	Palomar	NEAT	·	1.8 km	MPC · JPL
177367	2004 BD_{20}	—	January 18, 2004	Palomar	NEAT	·	2.3 km	MPC · JPL
177368	2004 BH_{24}	—	January 19, 2004	Anderson Mesa	LONEOS	·	1.9 km	MPC · JPL
177369	2004 BQ_{28}	—	January 18, 2004	Palomar	NEAT	·	2.0 km	MPC · JPL
177370	2004 BT_{31}	—	January 19, 2004	Anderson Mesa	LONEOS	·	2.3 km	MPC · JPL
177371	2004 BY_{33}	—	January 19, 2004	Kitt Peak	Spacewatch	·	2.9 km	MPC · JPL
177372	2004 BE_{36}	—	January 19, 2004	Kitt Peak	Spacewatch	·	1.8 km	MPC · JPL
177373	2004 BB_{37}	—	January 19, 2004	Kitt Peak	Spacewatch	NYS	1.9 km	MPC · JPL
177374	2004 BT_{39}	—	January 21, 2004	Socorro	LINEAR	JUN	1.3 km	MPC · JPL
177375	2004 BH_{51}	—	January 21, 2004	Socorro	LINEAR	·	2.9 km	MPC · JPL
177376	2004 BW_{54}	—	January 22, 2004	Socorro	LINEAR	NYS	1.9 km	MPC · JPL
177377	2004 BR_{57}	—	January 23, 2004	Socorro	LINEAR	·	1.9 km	MPC · JPL
177378	2004 BX_{57}	—	January 23, 2004	Anderson Mesa	LONEOS	·	2.4 km	MPC · JPL
177379	2004 BD_{58}	—	January 23, 2004	Socorro	LINEAR	·	2.0 km	MPC · JPL
177380	2004 BE_{60}	—	January 21, 2004	Socorro	LINEAR	MAS	1.2 km	MPC · JPL
177381	2004 BP_{60}	—	January 21, 2004	Socorro	LINEAR	·	1.9 km	MPC · JPL
177382	2004 BW_{62}	—	January 22, 2004	Socorro	LINEAR	NYS	2.0 km	MPC · JPL
177383	2004 BC_{63}	—	January 22, 2004	Socorro	LINEAR	·	1.6 km	MPC · JPL
177384	2004 BS_{70}	—	January 22, 2004	Socorro	LINEAR	·	2.0 km	MPC · JPL
177385	2004 BG_{72}	—	January 23, 2004	Socorro	LINEAR	·	2.2 km	MPC · JPL
177386	2004 BY_{73}	—	January 24, 2004	Socorro	LINEAR	ADE	4.1 km	MPC · JPL
177387	2004 BA_{74}	—	January 24, 2004	Socorro	LINEAR	·	1.8 km	MPC · JPL
177388	2004 BF_{80}	—	January 24, 2004	Socorro	LINEAR	·	1.9 km	MPC · JPL
177389	2004 BS_{82}	—	January 23, 2004	Socorro	LINEAR	·	2.1 km	MPC · JPL
177390	2004 BA_{83}	—	January 28, 2004	Kitt Peak	Spacewatch	·	3.0 km	MPC · JPL
177391	2004 BX_{83}	—	January 23, 2004	Socorro	LINEAR	EUN	2.0 km	MPC · JPL
177392	2004 BD_{84}	—	January 24, 2004	Socorro	LINEAR	NYS	1.6 km	MPC · JPL
177393	2004 BH_{88}	—	January 23, 2004	Socorro	LINEAR	V	970 m	MPC · JPL
177394	2004 BV_{89}	—	January 23, 2004	Socorro	LINEAR	ADE	2.9 km	MPC · JPL
177395	2004 BU_{93}	—	January 28, 2004	Socorro	LINEAR	·	3.1 km	MPC · JPL
177396	2004 BY_{93}	—	January 28, 2004	Socorro	LINEAR	·	3.6 km	MPC · JPL
177397	2004 BA_{94}	—	January 28, 2004	Haleakala	NEAT	·	2.4 km	MPC · JPL
177398	2004 BE_{104}	—	January 23, 2004	Socorro	LINEAR	·	2.3 km	MPC · JPL
177399	2004 BR_{104}	—	January 23, 2004	Socorro	LINEAR	·	3.5 km	MPC · JPL
177400	2004 BB_{107}	—	January 28, 2004	Kitt Peak	Spacewatch	·	2.0 km	MPC · JPL

== 177401–177500 ==
back to top

Designation			Discovery			Properties		Ref
Permanent	Provisional	Named after	Date	Site	Discoverer(s)	Category	Diam.	Ref
177401	2004 BK_{107}	—	January 28, 2004	Catalina	CSS	·	2.0 km	MPC · JPL
177402	2004 BV_{107}	—	January 28, 2004	Catalina	CSS	·	3.4 km	MPC · JPL
177403	2004 BA_{110}	—	January 28, 2004	Catalina	CSS	HNS	3.4 km	MPC · JPL
177404	2004 BC_{110}	—	January 28, 2004	Catalina	CSS	·	2.5 km	MPC · JPL
177405	2004 BK_{119}	—	January 30, 2004	Socorro	LINEAR	·	2.6 km	MPC · JPL
177406	2004 BU_{145}	—	January 21, 2004	Socorro	LINEAR	V	1.1 km	MPC · JPL
177407	2004 BT_{146}	—	January 22, 2004	Socorro	LINEAR	MAS	1.1 km	MPC · JPL
177408	2004 BC_{147}	—	January 22, 2004	Socorro	LINEAR	·	2.0 km	MPC · JPL
177409	2004 BS_{149}	—	January 16, 2004	Kitt Peak	Spacewatch	·	1.9 km	MPC · JPL
177410	2004 BQ_{152}	—	January 26, 2004	Anderson Mesa	LONEOS	·	2.0 km	MPC · JPL
177411	2004 BE_{162}	—	January 16, 2004	Palomar	NEAT	·	1.8 km	MPC · JPL
177412	2004 CK	—	February 2, 2004	Socorro	LINEAR	·	2.2 km	MPC · JPL
177413	2004 CF_{2}	—	February 12, 2004	Desert Eagle	W. K. Y. Yeung	EUN	1.6 km	MPC · JPL
177414	2004 CL_{2}	—	February 11, 2004	Palomar	NEAT	·	3.1 km	MPC · JPL
177415 Queloz	2004 CK_{3}	Queloz	February 9, 2004	Vicques	M. Ory	·	2.3 km	MPC · JPL
177416	2004 CB_{5}	—	February 10, 2004	Nogales	Tenagra II	MAS	1 km	MPC · JPL
177417	2004 CD_{5}	—	February 10, 2004	Palomar	NEAT	·	3.2 km	MPC · JPL
177418	2004 CT_{10}	—	February 11, 2004	Palomar	NEAT	·	1.7 km	MPC · JPL
177419	2004 CG_{12}	—	February 11, 2004	Catalina	CSS	MAS	1.4 km	MPC · JPL
177420	2004 CX_{12}	—	February 11, 2004	Palomar	NEAT	·	2.1 km	MPC · JPL
177421	2004 CC_{13}	—	February 11, 2004	Palomar	NEAT	MAR	2.1 km	MPC · JPL
177422	2004 CC_{18}	—	February 10, 2004	Palomar	NEAT	·	2.7 km	MPC · JPL
177423	2004 CL_{27}	—	February 11, 2004	Palomar	NEAT	NYS	2.7 km	MPC · JPL
177424	2004 CC_{28}	—	February 12, 2004	Kitt Peak	Spacewatch	MAS	1.2 km	MPC · JPL
177425	2004 CA_{37}	—	February 12, 2004	Palomar	NEAT	·	2.1 km	MPC · JPL
177426	2004 CZ_{49}	—	February 11, 2004	Palomar	NEAT	PHO	1.8 km	MPC · JPL
177427	2004 CX_{50}	—	February 11, 2004	Anderson Mesa	LONEOS	·	3.3 km	MPC · JPL
177428	2004 CY_{54}	—	February 11, 2004	Palomar	NEAT	·	1.8 km	MPC · JPL
177429	2004 CQ_{63}	—	February 12, 2004	Palomar	NEAT	PHO	3.5 km	MPC · JPL
177430	2004 CG_{64}	—	February 13, 2004	Kitt Peak	Spacewatch	·	2.5 km	MPC · JPL
177431	2004 CH_{68}	—	February 11, 2004	Anderson Mesa	LONEOS	·	1.7 km	MPC · JPL
177432	2004 CO_{71}	—	February 13, 2004	Palomar	NEAT	·	2.2 km	MPC · JPL
177433	2004 CN_{72}	—	February 13, 2004	Kitt Peak	Spacewatch	·	2.0 km	MPC · JPL
177434	2004 CP_{78}	—	February 11, 2004	Palomar	NEAT	·	2.2 km	MPC · JPL
177435	2004 CL_{79}	—	February 11, 2004	Kitt Peak	Spacewatch	NYS	2.0 km	MPC · JPL
177436	2004 CA_{80}	—	February 11, 2004	Palomar	NEAT	MAS	1.1 km	MPC · JPL
177437	2004 CQ_{92}	—	February 14, 2004	Haleakala	NEAT	HNS	1.9 km	MPC · JPL
177438	2004 CK_{94}	—	February 11, 2004	Palomar	NEAT	MAS	1.4 km	MPC · JPL
177439	2004 CJ_{95}	—	February 13, 2004	Palomar	NEAT	·	2.4 km	MPC · JPL
177440	2004 CL_{95}	—	February 13, 2004	Palomar	NEAT	·	3.4 km	MPC · JPL
177441	2004 CD_{96}	—	February 14, 2004	Kitt Peak	Spacewatch	·	2.4 km	MPC · JPL
177442	2004 CW_{98}	—	February 14, 2004	Catalina	CSS	·	1.9 km	MPC · JPL
177443	2004 CA_{105}	—	February 13, 2004	Palomar	NEAT	·	3.0 km	MPC · JPL
177444	2004 CD_{105}	—	February 13, 2004	Palomar	NEAT	·	5.7 km	MPC · JPL
177445	2004 CZ_{106}	—	February 14, 2004	Palomar	NEAT	MAR	1.7 km	MPC · JPL
177446	2004 CW_{107}	—	February 14, 2004	Kitt Peak	Spacewatch	·	2.2 km	MPC · JPL
177447	2004 CZ_{115}	—	February 11, 2004	Kitt Peak	Spacewatch	·	1.7 km	MPC · JPL
177448	2004 DA_{8}	—	February 17, 2004	Kitt Peak	Spacewatch	·	2.0 km	MPC · JPL
177449	2004 DY_{10}	—	February 16, 2004	Kitt Peak	Spacewatch	·	4.5 km	MPC · JPL
177450	2004 DH_{11}	—	February 16, 2004	Kitt Peak	Spacewatch	·	2.0 km	MPC · JPL
177451	2004 DQ_{12}	—	February 16, 2004	Catalina	CSS	·	1.8 km	MPC · JPL
177452	2004 DC_{16}	—	February 17, 2004	Kitt Peak	Spacewatch	·	3.9 km	MPC · JPL
177453	2004 DS_{17}	—	February 18, 2004	Kitt Peak	Spacewatch	·	2.2 km	MPC · JPL
177454	2004 DC_{19}	—	February 16, 2004	Catalina	CSS	V	1.2 km	MPC · JPL
177455	2004 DM_{19}	—	February 17, 2004	Socorro	LINEAR	·	2.5 km	MPC · JPL
177456	2004 DE_{21}	—	February 17, 2004	Catalina	CSS	·	4.2 km	MPC · JPL
177457	2004 DH_{36}	—	February 19, 2004	Socorro	LINEAR	·	1.4 km	MPC · JPL
177458	2004 DO_{37}	—	February 19, 2004	Socorro	LINEAR	EUN	1.5 km	MPC · JPL
177459	2004 DS_{37}	—	February 19, 2004	Socorro	LINEAR	(5)	1.8 km	MPC · JPL
177460	2004 DL_{41}	—	February 18, 2004	Haleakala	NEAT	·	2.3 km	MPC · JPL
177461	2004 DV_{41}	—	February 19, 2004	Socorro	LINEAR	·	1.5 km	MPC · JPL
177462	2004 DP_{42}	—	February 19, 2004	Socorro	LINEAR	·	2.9 km	MPC · JPL
177463	2004 DZ_{42}	—	February 23, 2004	Socorro	LINEAR	·	2.0 km	MPC · JPL
177464	2004 DF_{48}	—	February 19, 2004	Socorro	LINEAR	·	1.8 km	MPC · JPL
177465	2004 DQ_{50}	—	February 23, 2004	Socorro	LINEAR	·	2.2 km	MPC · JPL
177466	2004 DQ_{51}	—	February 23, 2004	Socorro	LINEAR	MIS	3.1 km	MPC · JPL
177467	2004 DG_{57}	—	February 23, 2004	Socorro	LINEAR	MAR	2.2 km	MPC · JPL
177468	2004 DN_{60}	—	February 26, 2004	Socorro	LINEAR	·	1.6 km	MPC · JPL
177469	2004 DR_{70}	—	February 26, 2004	Socorro	LINEAR	·	2.4 km	MPC · JPL
177470	2004 DV_{71}	—	February 17, 2004	Socorro	LINEAR	MAR	1.6 km	MPC · JPL
177471	2004 DU_{72}	—	February 17, 2004	Palomar	NEAT	·	2.4 km	MPC · JPL
177472	2004 DX_{75}	—	February 17, 2004	Socorro	LINEAR	·	1.9 km	MPC · JPL
177473	2004 DF_{76}	—	February 17, 2004	Kitt Peak	Spacewatch	(11882)	2.3 km	MPC · JPL
177474	2004 EJ_{4}	—	March 11, 2004	Palomar	NEAT	·	4.1 km	MPC · JPL
177475	2004 EZ_{4}	—	March 11, 2004	Palomar	NEAT	·	1.7 km	MPC · JPL
177476	2004 ET_{8}	—	March 13, 2004	Palomar	NEAT	MIS	3.2 km	MPC · JPL
177477	2004 EA_{10}	—	March 12, 2004	Palomar	NEAT	·	3.1 km	MPC · JPL
177478	2004 EC_{11}	—	March 15, 2004	Desert Eagle	W. K. Y. Yeung	·	1.9 km	MPC · JPL
177479	2004 EA_{14}	—	March 11, 2004	Palomar	NEAT	·	2.3 km	MPC · JPL
177480	2004 EX_{14}	—	March 11, 2004	Palomar	NEAT	·	2.0 km	MPC · JPL
177481	2004 EH_{16}	—	March 12, 2004	Palomar	NEAT	·	2.3 km	MPC · JPL
177482	2004 EV_{16}	—	March 12, 2004	Palomar	NEAT	EUN	2.1 km	MPC · JPL
177483	2004 EJ_{18}	—	March 12, 2004	Palomar	NEAT	slow	3.5 km	MPC · JPL
177484	2004 EK_{19}	—	March 14, 2004	Kitt Peak	Spacewatch	·	2.1 km	MPC · JPL
177485	2004 ET_{19}	—	March 14, 2004	Kitt Peak	Spacewatch	·	3.3 km	MPC · JPL
177486	2004 EZ_{29}	—	March 15, 2004	Kitt Peak	Spacewatch	·	3.3 km	MPC · JPL
177487	2004 EX_{31}	—	March 14, 2004	Palomar	NEAT	·	1.9 km	MPC · JPL
177488	2004 EG_{32}	—	March 15, 2004	Kitt Peak	Spacewatch	·	2.3 km	MPC · JPL
177489	2004 EY_{32}	—	March 15, 2004	Palomar	NEAT	·	3.6 km	MPC · JPL
177490	2004 EW_{34}	—	March 12, 2004	Palomar	NEAT	·	1.4 km	MPC · JPL
177491	2004 ED_{37}	—	March 13, 2004	Palomar	NEAT	·	5.1 km	MPC · JPL
177492	2004 EB_{38}	—	March 14, 2004	Palomar	NEAT	·	2.6 km	MPC · JPL
177493	2004 EB_{40}	—	March 15, 2004	Socorro	LINEAR	·	5.3 km	MPC · JPL
177494	2004 EE_{41}	—	March 15, 2004	Catalina	CSS	·	3.7 km	MPC · JPL
177495	2004 EG_{41}	—	March 15, 2004	Socorro	LINEAR	·	1.6 km	MPC · JPL
177496	2004 EN_{47}	—	March 15, 2004	Catalina	CSS	·	2.4 km	MPC · JPL
177497	2004 EV_{47}	—	March 15, 2004	Catalina	CSS	·	2.1 km	MPC · JPL
177498	2004 EC_{48}	—	March 15, 2004	Catalina	CSS	·	2.0 km	MPC · JPL
177499	2004 EF_{50}	—	March 12, 2004	Palomar	NEAT	(5)	1.2 km	MPC · JPL
177500	2004 EV_{52}	—	March 15, 2004	Catalina	CSS	·	3.8 km	MPC · JPL

== 177501–177600 ==
back to top

Designation			Discovery			Properties		Ref
Permanent	Provisional	Named after	Date	Site	Discoverer(s)	Category	Diam.	Ref
177501	2004 EW_{52}	—	March 15, 2004	Socorro	LINEAR	·	3.0 km	MPC · JPL
177502	2004 EZ_{52}	—	March 15, 2004	Socorro	LINEAR	·	2.4 km	MPC · JPL
177503	2004 EE_{53}	—	March 15, 2004	Socorro	LINEAR	·	3.4 km	MPC · JPL
177504	2004 EN_{56}	—	March 14, 2004	Palomar	NEAT	·	2.1 km	MPC · JPL
177505	2004 EP_{56}	—	March 14, 2004	Palomar	NEAT	·	2.3 km	MPC · JPL
177506	2004 ED_{58}	—	March 15, 2004	Catalina	CSS	·	1.9 km	MPC · JPL
177507	2004 EO_{58}	—	March 15, 2004	Socorro	LINEAR	EUN	1.4 km	MPC · JPL
177508	2004 EZ_{58}	—	March 15, 2004	Palomar	NEAT	·	3.8 km	MPC · JPL
177509	2004 EM_{59}	—	March 15, 2004	Palomar	NEAT	·	2.4 km	MPC · JPL
177510	2004 EP_{64}	—	March 14, 2004	Socorro	LINEAR	EUN	2.1 km	MPC · JPL
177511	2004 EW_{64}	—	March 14, 2004	Socorro	LINEAR	KRM	4.5 km	MPC · JPL
177512	2004 EA_{65}	—	March 14, 2004	Socorro	LINEAR	·	3.8 km	MPC · JPL
177513	2004 EH_{65}	—	March 14, 2004	Socorro	LINEAR	EUN	1.9 km	MPC · JPL
177514	2004 EG_{67}	—	March 15, 2004	Kitt Peak	Spacewatch	·	2.0 km	MPC · JPL
177515	2004 ER_{67}	—	March 15, 2004	Kitt Peak	Spacewatch	·	3.2 km	MPC · JPL
177516	2004 EB_{71}	—	March 15, 2004	Catalina	CSS	·	1.4 km	MPC · JPL
177517	2004 ED_{74}	—	March 12, 2004	Palomar	NEAT	·	2.0 km	MPC · JPL
177518	2004 EK_{77}	—	March 15, 2004	Socorro	LINEAR	AGN	2.1 km	MPC · JPL
177519	2004 EW_{79}	—	March 12, 2004	Palomar	NEAT	·	2.7 km	MPC · JPL
177520	2004 ET_{81}	—	March 15, 2004	Socorro	LINEAR	·	2.7 km	MPC · JPL
177521	2004 EK_{83}	—	March 14, 2004	Kitt Peak	Spacewatch	·	2.9 km	MPC · JPL
177522	2004 EP_{86}	—	March 15, 2004	Kitt Peak	Spacewatch	·	2.6 km	MPC · JPL
177523	2004 EO_{94}	—	March 15, 2004	Catalina	CSS	·	3.3 km	MPC · JPL
177524	2004 EA_{100}	—	March 15, 2004	Kitt Peak	Spacewatch	·	2.0 km	MPC · JPL
177525	2004 FS_{11}	—	March 16, 2004	Catalina	CSS	DOR	4.9 km	MPC · JPL
177526	2004 FC_{16}	—	March 23, 2004	Goodricke-Pigott	R. A. Tucker	·	3.3 km	MPC · JPL
177527	2004 FK_{19}	—	March 16, 2004	Catalina	CSS	·	3.1 km	MPC · JPL
177528	2004 FV_{19}	—	March 16, 2004	Socorro	LINEAR	TIN	4.5 km	MPC · JPL
177529	2004 FK_{20}	—	March 16, 2004	Socorro	LINEAR	·	3.6 km	MPC · JPL
177530	2004 FP_{21}	—	March 16, 2004	Kitt Peak	Spacewatch	AGN	1.6 km	MPC · JPL
177531	2004 FR_{21}	—	March 16, 2004	Kitt Peak	Spacewatch	·	1.5 km	MPC · JPL
177532	2004 FX_{23}	—	March 17, 2004	Kitt Peak	Spacewatch	·	3.0 km	MPC · JPL
177533	2004 FX_{24}	—	March 17, 2004	Socorro	LINEAR	MAR	1.8 km	MPC · JPL
177534	2004 FA_{28}	—	March 17, 2004	Kitt Peak	Spacewatch	·	2.5 km	MPC · JPL
177535	2004 FV_{29}	—	March 27, 2004	Bergisch Gladbach	W. Bickel	·	4.6 km	MPC · JPL
177536	2004 FT_{34}	—	March 16, 2004	Socorro	LINEAR	RAF	1.6 km	MPC · JPL
177537	2004 FO_{37}	—	March 17, 2004	Kitt Peak	Spacewatch	·	4.4 km	MPC · JPL
177538	2004 FT_{48}	—	March 18, 2004	Socorro	LINEAR	MAR	1.9 km	MPC · JPL
177539	2004 FZ_{53}	—	March 18, 2004	Socorro	LINEAR	·	2.8 km	MPC · JPL
177540	2004 FU_{55}	—	March 20, 2004	Socorro	LINEAR	NEM	5.3 km	MPC · JPL
177541	2004 FA_{56}	—	March 20, 2004	Socorro	LINEAR	·	3.1 km	MPC · JPL
177542	2004 FC_{59}	—	March 18, 2004	Kitt Peak	Spacewatch	·	2.6 km	MPC · JPL
177543	2004 FM_{63}	—	March 19, 2004	Socorro	LINEAR	·	2.9 km	MPC · JPL
177544	2004 FS_{63}	—	March 19, 2004	Socorro	LINEAR	·	1.7 km	MPC · JPL
177545	2004 FZ_{63}	—	March 19, 2004	Socorro	LINEAR	GEF	2.1 km	MPC · JPL
177546	2004 FB_{66}	—	March 19, 2004	Socorro	LINEAR	·	3.1 km	MPC · JPL
177547	2004 FJ_{67}	—	March 20, 2004	Socorro	LINEAR	AGN	2.1 km	MPC · JPL
177548	2004 FW_{67}	—	March 20, 2004	Socorro	LINEAR	·	2.1 km	MPC · JPL
177549	2004 FB_{68}	—	March 20, 2004	Socorro	LINEAR	·	2.8 km	MPC · JPL
177550	2004 FZ_{68}	—	March 16, 2004	Kitt Peak	Spacewatch	·	1.9 km	MPC · JPL
177551	2004 FO_{81}	—	March 16, 2004	Socorro	LINEAR	·	3.1 km	MPC · JPL
177552	2004 FR_{83}	—	March 18, 2004	Palomar	NEAT	·	3.8 km	MPC · JPL
177553	2004 FR_{84}	—	March 18, 2004	Socorro	LINEAR	·	2.0 km	MPC · JPL
177554	2004 FB_{86}	—	March 19, 2004	Palomar	NEAT	MAR	1.6 km	MPC · JPL
177555	2004 FB_{91}	—	March 21, 2004	Kitt Peak	Spacewatch	·	3.4 km	MPC · JPL
177556	2004 FW_{91}	—	March 22, 2004	Socorro	LINEAR	·	3.3 km	MPC · JPL
177557	2004 FV_{96}	—	March 23, 2004	Socorro	LINEAR	·	2.4 km	MPC · JPL
177558	2004 FQ_{98}	—	March 19, 2004	Socorro	LINEAR	·	3.2 km	MPC · JPL
177559	2004 FR_{98}	—	March 19, 2004	Socorro	LINEAR	NEM	3.4 km	MPC · JPL
177560	2004 FZ_{101}	—	March 19, 2004	Socorro	LINEAR	·	2.8 km	MPC · JPL
177561	2004 FN_{105}	—	March 24, 2004	Siding Spring	SSS	HNS	2.1 km	MPC · JPL
177562	2004 FS_{105}	—	March 25, 2004	Socorro	LINEAR	EUN	1.9 km	MPC · JPL
177563	2004 FD_{107}	—	March 20, 2004	Socorro	LINEAR	·	3.5 km	MPC · JPL
177564	2004 FN_{109}	—	March 24, 2004	Anderson Mesa	LONEOS	·	4.0 km	MPC · JPL
177565	2004 FZ_{115}	—	March 23, 2004	Socorro	LINEAR	·	3.3 km	MPC · JPL
177566	2004 FM_{116}	—	March 23, 2004	Socorro	LINEAR	·	2.2 km	MPC · JPL
177567	2004 FC_{119}	—	March 23, 2004	Kitt Peak	Spacewatch	·	1.8 km	MPC · JPL
177568	2004 FS_{119}	—	March 23, 2004	Kitt Peak	Spacewatch	·	3.6 km	MPC · JPL
177569	2004 FT_{120}	—	March 23, 2004	Socorro	LINEAR	·	2.8 km	MPC · JPL
177570	2004 FX_{120}	—	March 23, 2004	Socorro	LINEAR	·	2.8 km	MPC · JPL
177571	2004 FY_{125}	—	March 27, 2004	Socorro	LINEAR	·	2.5 km	MPC · JPL
177572	2004 FU_{126}	—	March 27, 2004	Socorro	LINEAR	·	4.3 km	MPC · JPL
177573	2004 FW_{131}	—	March 23, 2004	Kitt Peak	Spacewatch	·	2.1 km	MPC · JPL
177574	2004 FM_{134}	—	March 26, 2004	Socorro	LINEAR	·	4.2 km	MPC · JPL
177575	2004 FD_{138}	—	March 29, 2004	Kitt Peak	Spacewatch	·	1.7 km	MPC · JPL
177576	2004 FQ_{138}	—	March 17, 2004	Socorro	LINEAR	·	2.8 km	MPC · JPL
177577	2004 FW_{145}	—	March 30, 2004	Kitt Peak	Spacewatch	·	1.7 km	MPC · JPL
177578	2004 FL_{152}	—	March 17, 2004	Kitt Peak	Spacewatch	KOR	1.7 km	MPC · JPL
177579	2004 FW_{158}	—	March 18, 2004	Kitt Peak	Spacewatch	·	2.3 km	MPC · JPL
177580	2004 GK_{2}	—	April 12, 2004	Siding Spring	SSS	EUN	1.9 km	MPC · JPL
177581	2004 GS_{7}	—	April 12, 2004	Anderson Mesa	LONEOS	·	2.0 km	MPC · JPL
177582	2004 GC_{8}	—	April 12, 2004	Anderson Mesa	LONEOS	NEM	3.1 km	MPC · JPL
177583	2004 GT_{9}	—	April 10, 2004	Kvistaberg	Uppsala-DLR Asteroid Survey	MAR	2.0 km	MPC · JPL
177584	2004 GJ_{11}	—	April 13, 2004	Socorro	LINEAR	·	3.5 km	MPC · JPL
177585	2004 GN_{13}	—	April 13, 2004	Palomar	NEAT	JUN	2.2 km	MPC · JPL
177586	2004 GH_{14}	—	April 13, 2004	Catalina	CSS	·	2.2 km	MPC · JPL
177587	2004 GH_{16}	—	April 10, 2004	Palomar	NEAT	·	5.5 km	MPC · JPL
177588	2004 GW_{16}	—	April 10, 2004	Catalina	CSS	EUN	2.3 km	MPC · JPL
177589	2004 GT_{21}	—	April 11, 2004	Palomar	NEAT	·	5.9 km	MPC · JPL
177590	2004 GJ_{26}	—	April 14, 2004	Anderson Mesa	LONEOS	AEO	2.1 km	MPC · JPL
177591	2004 GV_{37}	—	April 14, 2004	Anderson Mesa	LONEOS	DOR	3.7 km	MPC · JPL
177592	2004 GR_{38}	—	April 15, 2004	Catalina	CSS	·	2.8 km	MPC · JPL
177593	2004 GR_{39}	—	April 15, 2004	Siding Spring	SSS	·	2.9 km	MPC · JPL
177594	2004 GK_{41}	—	April 12, 2004	Siding Spring	SSS	·	3.5 km	MPC · JPL
177595	2004 GD_{44}	—	April 12, 2004	Palomar	NEAT	·	2.5 km	MPC · JPL
177596	2004 GS_{47}	—	April 12, 2004	Kitt Peak	Spacewatch	·	3.2 km	MPC · JPL
177597	2004 GB_{48}	—	April 12, 2004	Kitt Peak	Spacewatch	·	2.1 km	MPC · JPL
177598	2004 GJ_{48}	—	April 12, 2004	Kitt Peak	Spacewatch	·	1.7 km	MPC · JPL
177599	2004 GJ_{57}	—	April 14, 2004	Kitt Peak	Spacewatch	AGN	1.4 km	MPC · JPL
177600	2004 GJ_{59}	—	April 12, 2004	Palomar	NEAT	·	2.6 km	MPC · JPL

== 177601–177700 ==
back to top

Designation			Discovery			Properties		Ref
Permanent	Provisional	Named after	Date	Site	Discoverer(s)	Category	Diam.	Ref
177601	2004 GN_{73}	—	April 14, 2004	Bergisch Gladbach	W. Bickel	·	1.8 km	MPC · JPL
177602	2004 GW_{74}	—	April 15, 2004	Socorro	LINEAR	·	3.3 km	MPC · JPL
177603	2004 GD_{75}	—	April 14, 2004	Anderson Mesa	LONEOS	·	3.3 km	MPC · JPL
177604	2004 GY_{75}	—	April 15, 2004	Siding Spring	SSS	·	3.7 km	MPC · JPL
177605	2004 GJ_{78}	—	April 9, 2004	Siding Spring	SSS	·	1.8 km	MPC · JPL
177606	2004 GY_{81}	—	April 13, 2004	Catalina	CSS	·	2.4 km	MPC · JPL
177607	2004 HD_{1}	—	April 19, 2004	Siding Spring	SSS	·	6.0 km	MPC · JPL
177608	2004 HC_{5}	—	April 16, 2004	Palomar	NEAT	·	2.8 km	MPC · JPL
177609	2004 HY_{6}	—	April 16, 2004	Socorro	LINEAR	·	2.4 km	MPC · JPL
177610	2004 HE_{10}	—	April 17, 2004	Socorro	LINEAR	·	3.7 km	MPC · JPL
177611	2004 HO_{15}	—	April 16, 2004	Kitt Peak	Spacewatch	AGN	1.7 km	MPC · JPL
177612	2004 HK_{24}	—	April 16, 2004	Socorro	LINEAR	·	3.6 km	MPC · JPL
177613	2004 HK_{31}	—	April 16, 2004	Palomar	NEAT	·	3.2 km	MPC · JPL
177614	2004 HK_{33}	—	April 21, 2004	Socorro	LINEAR	APO +1km · PHA	1.1 km	MPC · JPL
177615	2004 HB_{44}	—	April 21, 2004	Socorro	LINEAR	·	4.1 km	MPC · JPL
177616	2004 HX_{47}	—	April 22, 2004	Siding Spring	SSS	GEF	2.2 km	MPC · JPL
177617	2004 HR_{48}	—	April 22, 2004	Siding Spring	SSS	·	3.7 km	MPC · JPL
177618	2004 HA_{54}	—	April 22, 2004	Catalina	CSS	TIN	3.0 km	MPC · JPL
177619	2004 HB_{56}	—	April 24, 2004	Siding Spring	SSS	·	3.2 km	MPC · JPL
177620	2004 HC_{58}	—	April 22, 2004	Kitt Peak	Spacewatch	KOR	1.5 km	MPC · JPL
177621	2004 HN_{60}	—	April 25, 2004	Socorro	LINEAR	·	2.1 km	MPC · JPL
177622	2004 HF_{61}	—	April 25, 2004	Socorro	LINEAR	·	2.7 km	MPC · JPL
177623	2004 HU_{61}	—	April 25, 2004	Socorro	LINEAR	·	2.3 km	MPC · JPL
177624	2004 HB_{73}	—	April 28, 2004	Kitt Peak	Spacewatch	HYG	3.6 km	MPC · JPL
177625 Dembicky	2004 JD	Dembicky	May 8, 2004	Wrightwood	J. W. Young	·	3.0 km	MPC · JPL
177626	2004 JH_{5}	—	May 9, 2004	Kitt Peak	Spacewatch	·	3.6 km	MPC · JPL
177627	2004 JO_{11}	—	May 13, 2004	Socorro	LINEAR	·	2.9 km	MPC · JPL
177628	2004 JA_{12}	—	May 13, 2004	Palomar	NEAT	·	2.7 km	MPC · JPL
177629	2004 JM_{25}	—	May 15, 2004	Socorro	LINEAR	LIX	6.4 km	MPC · JPL
177630	2004 JZ_{42}	—	May 15, 2004	Socorro	LINEAR	·	5.0 km	MPC · JPL
177631	2004 JM_{44}	—	May 15, 2004	Socorro	LINEAR	·	1.9 km	MPC · JPL
177632	2004 JS_{48}	—	May 13, 2004	Kitt Peak	Spacewatch	·	3.5 km	MPC · JPL
177633	2004 JW_{54}	—	May 10, 2004	Kitt Peak	Spacewatch	HOF	4.1 km	MPC · JPL
177634	2004 KL_{4}	—	May 16, 2004	Siding Spring	SSS	·	2.3 km	MPC · JPL
177635	2004 LQ_{3}	—	June 11, 2004	Palomar	NEAT	·	5.6 km	MPC · JPL
177636	2004 LB_{9}	—	June 13, 2004	Socorro	LINEAR	·	4.0 km	MPC · JPL
177637	2004 LY_{13}	—	June 11, 2004	Socorro	LINEAR	EUN	2.4 km	MPC · JPL
177638	2004 LB_{22}	—	June 13, 2004	Kitt Peak	Spacewatch	·	5.4 km	MPC · JPL
177639	2004 LW_{28}	—	June 14, 2004	Kitt Peak	Spacewatch	·	4.2 km	MPC · JPL
177640	2004 NX_{10}	—	July 10, 2004	Catalina	CSS	HIL · 3:2	10 km	MPC · JPL
177641	2004 NE_{20}	—	July 14, 2004	Socorro	LINEAR	HYG	3.2 km	MPC · JPL
177642	2004 NU_{27}	—	July 11, 2004	Socorro	LINEAR	·	6.4 km	MPC · JPL
177643	2004 OO_{4}	—	July 16, 2004	Socorro	LINEAR	·	4.7 km	MPC · JPL
177644	2004 PN_{88}	—	August 11, 2004	Palomar	NEAT	·	6.6 km	MPC · JPL
177645	2004 PQ_{89}	—	August 9, 2004	Campo Imperatore	CINEOS	·	3.3 km	MPC · JPL
177646	2004 RK_{80}	—	September 8, 2004	Socorro	LINEAR	·	4.6 km	MPC · JPL
177647	2004 RF_{110}	—	September 6, 2004	Socorro	LINEAR	H	960 m	MPC · JPL
177648	2004 RR_{179}	—	September 10, 2004	Socorro	LINEAR	·	4.0 km	MPC · JPL
177649	2004 TP_{8}	—	October 6, 2004	Socorro	LINEAR	H	1.0 km	MPC · JPL
177650	2004 VN_{75}	—	November 4, 2004	Socorro	LINEAR	H	890 m	MPC · JPL
177651	2004 XM_{14}	—	December 10, 2004	Catalina	CSS	APO +1km	1.1 km	MPC · JPL
177652	2004 XW_{130}	—	December 15, 2004	Catalina	CSS	H	850 m	MPC · JPL
177653	2004 XM_{155}	—	December 12, 2004	Kitt Peak	Spacewatch	·	1.1 km	MPC · JPL
177654	2004 YR_{33}	—	December 16, 2004	Catalina	CSS	H	1.1 km	MPC · JPL
177655	2005 AF_{32}	—	January 11, 2005	Socorro	LINEAR	L5	19 km	MPC · JPL
177656	2005 CU_{6}	—	February 2, 2005	Catalina	CSS	H	1.1 km	MPC · JPL
177657	2005 CN_{21}	—	February 2, 2005	Catalina	CSS	NYS	1.8 km	MPC · JPL
177658	2005 CJ_{74}	—	February 1, 2005	Kitt Peak	Spacewatch	·	2.3 km	MPC · JPL
177659 Paolacel	2005 CE_{77}	Paolacel	February 9, 2005	La Silla	A. Boattini, H. Scholl	·	1.8 km	MPC · JPL
177660	2005 EJ_{2}	—	March 3, 2005	Socorro	LINEAR	H	1.4 km	MPC · JPL
177661	2005 EK_{5}	—	March 1, 2005	Kitt Peak	Spacewatch	NYS	1.3 km	MPC · JPL
177662	2005 EM_{5}	—	March 1, 2005	Kitt Peak	Spacewatch	NYS	1.1 km	MPC · JPL
177663	2005 EC_{6}	—	March 1, 2005	Kitt Peak	Spacewatch	NYS	1.8 km	MPC · JPL
177664	2005 EH_{11}	—	March 2, 2005	Catalina	CSS	·	1.1 km	MPC · JPL
177665	2005 EV_{34}	—	March 3, 2005	Kitt Peak	Spacewatch	·	1.4 km	MPC · JPL
177666	2005 EW_{34}	—	March 3, 2005	Catalina	CSS	·	940 m	MPC · JPL
177667 Schieven	2005 EV_{37}	Schieven	March 3, 2005	Jarnac	Jarnac	·	1.0 km	MPC · JPL
177668	2005 EL_{42}	—	March 2, 2005	Catalina	CSS	H	1.0 km	MPC · JPL
177669	2005 EK_{46}	—	March 3, 2005	Catalina	CSS	·	2.4 km	MPC · JPL
177670	2005 EM_{50}	—	March 3, 2005	Catalina	CSS	·	1.2 km	MPC · JPL
177671	2005 EX_{51}	—	March 3, 2005	Kitt Peak	Spacewatch	·	1.0 km	MPC · JPL
177672	2005 EQ_{58}	—	March 4, 2005	Kitt Peak	Spacewatch	NYS	1.3 km	MPC · JPL
177673	2005 EV_{68}	—	March 7, 2005	Socorro	LINEAR	·	1.0 km	MPC · JPL
177674	2005 EF_{88}	—	March 7, 2005	Siding Spring	SSS	·	1.5 km	MPC · JPL
177675	2005 ED_{98}	—	March 3, 2005	Catalina	CSS	·	1.9 km	MPC · JPL
177676	2005 EG_{130}	—	March 9, 2005	Mount Lemmon	Mount Lemmon Survey	V	940 m	MPC · JPL
177677	2005 EX_{138}	—	March 9, 2005	Mount Lemmon	Mount Lemmon Survey	·	1.8 km	MPC · JPL
177678	2005 EK_{205}	—	March 12, 2005	Mount Lemmon	Mount Lemmon Survey	·	1.3 km	MPC · JPL
177679	2005 EM_{205}	—	March 12, 2005	Kitt Peak	Spacewatch	·	920 m	MPC · JPL
177680	2005 ES_{216}	—	March 8, 2005	Mount Lemmon	Mount Lemmon Survey	·	810 m	MPC · JPL
177681	2005 ES_{223}	—	March 12, 2005	Kitt Peak	Spacewatch	·	870 m	MPC · JPL
177682	2005 ED_{232}	—	March 10, 2005	Mount Lemmon	Mount Lemmon Survey	·	970 m	MPC · JPL
177683	2005 EE_{234}	—	March 10, 2005	Anderson Mesa	LONEOS	·	1.5 km	MPC · JPL
177684	2005 EJ_{253}	—	March 11, 2005	Anderson Mesa	LONEOS	·	1.1 km	MPC · JPL
177685	2005 EE_{264}	—	March 13, 2005	Kitt Peak	Spacewatch	ERI	2.1 km	MPC · JPL
177686	2005 EU_{265}	—	March 13, 2005	Catalina	CSS	·	1.0 km	MPC · JPL
177687	2005 EX_{267}	—	March 14, 2005	Mount Lemmon	Mount Lemmon Survey	·	980 m	MPC · JPL
177688	2005 EY_{279}	—	March 10, 2005	Catalina	CSS	V	880 m	MPC · JPL
177689	2005 EX_{323}	—	March 11, 2005	Mount Lemmon	Mount Lemmon Survey	·	1.1 km	MPC · JPL
177690	2005 FX_{2}	—	March 16, 2005	Goodricke-Pigott	R. A. Tucker	NYS	1.5 km	MPC · JPL
177691	2005 GV_{3}	—	April 1, 2005	Kitt Peak	Spacewatch	·	1.1 km	MPC · JPL
177692	2005 GO_{6}	—	April 1, 2005	Kitt Peak	Spacewatch	·	800 m	MPC · JPL
177693	2005 GW_{6}	—	April 1, 2005	Kitt Peak	Spacewatch	·	820 m	MPC · JPL
177694	2005 GH_{11}	—	April 1, 2005	Anderson Mesa	LONEOS	V	910 m	MPC · JPL
177695	2005 GM_{20}	—	April 2, 2005	Mount Lemmon	Mount Lemmon Survey	·	1.2 km	MPC · JPL
177696	2005 GA_{23}	—	April 1, 2005	Anderson Mesa	LONEOS	·	1.1 km	MPC · JPL
177697	2005 GF_{23}	—	April 1, 2005	Kitt Peak	Spacewatch	·	1.3 km	MPC · JPL
177698	2005 GW_{26}	—	April 2, 2005	Anderson Mesa	LONEOS	·	1.2 km	MPC · JPL
177699	2005 GJ_{29}	—	April 4, 2005	Kitt Peak	Spacewatch	·	920 m	MPC · JPL
177700	2005 GL_{51}	—	April 2, 2005	Mount Lemmon	Mount Lemmon Survey	V	1.0 km	MPC · JPL

== 177701–177800 ==
back to top

Designation			Discovery			Properties		Ref
Permanent	Provisional	Named after	Date	Site	Discoverer(s)	Category	Diam.	Ref
177701	2005 GM_{66}	—	April 2, 2005	Mount Lemmon	Mount Lemmon Survey	·	1.9 km	MPC · JPL
177702	2005 GS_{70}	—	April 4, 2005	Kitt Peak	Spacewatch	NYS	1.4 km	MPC · JPL
177703	2005 GU_{71}	—	April 4, 2005	Catalina	CSS	·	1.0 km	MPC · JPL
177704	2005 GU_{73}	—	April 4, 2005	Catalina	CSS	·	1.5 km	MPC · JPL
177705	2005 GK_{79}	—	April 6, 2005	Mount Lemmon	Mount Lemmon Survey	·	1.0 km	MPC · JPL
177706	2005 GE_{90}	—	April 6, 2005	Kitt Peak	Spacewatch	·	1.1 km	MPC · JPL
177707	2005 GV_{93}	—	April 6, 2005	Kitt Peak	Spacewatch	·	1.4 km	MPC · JPL
177708	2005 GQ_{103}	—	April 9, 2005	Mount Lemmon	Mount Lemmon Survey	·	790 m	MPC · JPL
177709	2005 GD_{123}	—	April 6, 2005	Mount Lemmon	Mount Lemmon Survey	MAS	1.0 km	MPC · JPL
177710	2005 GM_{125}	—	April 10, 2005	Mount Lemmon	Mount Lemmon Survey	·	1.1 km	MPC · JPL
177711	2005 GW_{127}	—	April 9, 2005	Socorro	LINEAR	·	1.0 km	MPC · JPL
177712	2005 GJ_{139}	—	April 12, 2005	Mount Lemmon	Mount Lemmon Survey	·	910 m	MPC · JPL
177713	2005 GZ_{140}	—	April 14, 2005	Reedy Creek	J. Broughton	·	2.8 km	MPC · JPL
177714	2005 GZ_{145}	—	April 11, 2005	Kitt Peak	Spacewatch	·	920 m	MPC · JPL
177715	2005 GN_{154}	—	April 9, 2005	Socorro	LINEAR	·	980 m	MPC · JPL
177716	2005 GH_{160}	—	April 12, 2005	Kitt Peak	Spacewatch	·	910 m	MPC · JPL
177717	2005 GB_{161}	—	April 13, 2005	Socorro	LINEAR	·	2.0 km	MPC · JPL
177718	2005 GS_{161}	—	April 13, 2005	Catalina	CSS	·	2.5 km	MPC · JPL
177719	2005 GD_{167}	—	April 11, 2005	Mount Lemmon	Mount Lemmon Survey	·	1.9 km	MPC · JPL
177720	2005 GA_{175}	—	April 14, 2005	Kitt Peak	Spacewatch	·	1.2 km	MPC · JPL
177721	2005 GM_{202}	—	April 5, 2005	Kitt Peak	Spacewatch	·	980 m	MPC · JPL
177722 Pelletier	2005 GJ_{205}	Pelletier	April 11, 2005	Kitt Peak	M. W. Buie	·	970 m	MPC · JPL
177723	2005 GY_{214}	—	April 7, 2005	Kitt Peak	Spacewatch	·	1.3 km	MPC · JPL
177724	2005 GZ_{223}	—	April 12, 2005	Siding Spring	SSS	·	2.2 km	MPC · JPL
177725	2005 HM_{1}	—	April 16, 2005	Kitt Peak	Spacewatch	·	1.7 km	MPC · JPL
177726	2005 HX_{4}	—	April 30, 2005	Kitt Peak	Spacewatch	·	1.2 km	MPC · JPL
177727	2005 JP	—	May 3, 2005	Kitt Peak	Spacewatch	MAS	1.2 km	MPC · JPL
177728	2005 JE_{3}	—	May 3, 2005	Catalina	CSS	·	1.4 km	MPC · JPL
177729	2005 JL_{4}	—	May 3, 2005	Socorro	LINEAR	(5)	3.2 km	MPC · JPL
177730	2005 JM_{4}	—	May 3, 2005	Catalina	CSS	·	2.6 km	MPC · JPL
177731	2005 JK_{17}	—	May 4, 2005	Catalina	CSS	·	1.1 km	MPC · JPL
177732	2005 JZ_{20}	—	May 4, 2005	Palomar	NEAT	KOR	2.0 km	MPC · JPL
177733	2005 JO_{21}	—	May 4, 2005	Siding Spring	SSS	NYS	1.5 km	MPC · JPL
177734	2005 JV_{22}	—	May 1, 2005	Palomar	NEAT	·	1.7 km	MPC · JPL
177735	2005 JC_{25}	—	May 3, 2005	Kitt Peak	Spacewatch	·	1.7 km	MPC · JPL
177736	2005 JH_{25}	—	May 3, 2005	Kitt Peak	Spacewatch	·	1.5 km	MPC · JPL
177737	2005 JK_{27}	—	May 3, 2005	Socorro	LINEAR	·	1.3 km	MPC · JPL
177738	2005 JT_{31}	—	May 4, 2005	Anderson Mesa	LONEOS	·	1.2 km	MPC · JPL
177739	2005 JD_{38}	—	May 6, 2005	Socorro	LINEAR	EUN	2.0 km	MPC · JPL
177740	2005 JE_{38}	—	May 6, 2005	Haleakala	NEAT	·	1.4 km	MPC · JPL
177741	2005 JM_{42}	—	May 8, 2005	Anderson Mesa	LONEOS	·	1.1 km	MPC · JPL
177742	2005 JR_{42}	—	May 8, 2005	Kitt Peak	Spacewatch	·	1.5 km	MPC · JPL
177743	2005 JA_{43}	—	May 8, 2005	Socorro	LINEAR	(5)	2.0 km	MPC · JPL
177744	2005 JG_{44}	—	May 4, 2005	Siding Spring	SSS	·	1.8 km	MPC · JPL
177745	2005 JM_{44}	—	May 8, 2005	Mount Lemmon	Mount Lemmon Survey	·	1.7 km	MPC · JPL
177746	2005 JU_{54}	—	May 4, 2005	Mount Lemmon	Mount Lemmon Survey	V	1.1 km	MPC · JPL
177747	2005 JR_{55}	—	May 4, 2005	Palomar	NEAT	·	1.8 km	MPC · JPL
177748	2005 JQ_{64}	—	May 4, 2005	Palomar	NEAT	·	3.0 km	MPC · JPL
177749	2005 JU_{69}	—	May 7, 2005	Kitt Peak	Spacewatch	·	1.8 km	MPC · JPL
177750	2005 JH_{73}	—	May 8, 2005	Kitt Peak	Spacewatch	·	1.8 km	MPC · JPL
177751	2005 JB_{75}	—	May 8, 2005	Siding Spring	SSS	·	1.5 km	MPC · JPL
177752	2005 JR_{75}	—	May 9, 2005	Anderson Mesa	LONEOS	·	1.2 km	MPC · JPL
177753	2005 JC_{84}	—	May 8, 2005	Kitt Peak	Spacewatch	NYS	940 m	MPC · JPL
177754	2005 JE_{86}	—	May 8, 2005	Mount Lemmon	Mount Lemmon Survey	·	1.4 km	MPC · JPL
177755	2005 JT_{90}	—	May 11, 2005	Palomar	NEAT	(2076)	1.2 km	MPC · JPL
177756	2005 JV_{90}	—	May 11, 2005	Kitt Peak	Spacewatch	·	2.1 km	MPC · JPL
177757	2005 JE_{92}	—	May 11, 2005	Palomar	NEAT	·	1.7 km	MPC · JPL
177758	2005 JK_{93}	—	May 11, 2005	Palomar	NEAT	·	1.5 km	MPC · JPL
177759	2005 JL_{107}	—	May 12, 2005	Mount Lemmon	Mount Lemmon Survey	·	1.8 km	MPC · JPL
177760	2005 JP_{109}	—	May 12, 2005	Catalina	CSS	ADE	3.4 km	MPC · JPL
177761	2005 JU_{120}	—	May 10, 2005	Kitt Peak	Spacewatch	MAR	1.6 km	MPC · JPL
177762	2005 JF_{124}	—	May 11, 2005	Mount Lemmon	Mount Lemmon Survey	NYS	1.4 km	MPC · JPL
177763	2005 JG_{125}	—	May 11, 2005	Palomar	NEAT	·	2.1 km	MPC · JPL
177764	2005 JB_{127}	—	May 12, 2005	Mount Lemmon	Mount Lemmon Survey	NYS	2.0 km	MPC · JPL
177765	2005 JM_{127}	—	May 12, 2005	Socorro	LINEAR	·	1.7 km	MPC · JPL
177766	2005 JB_{128}	—	May 12, 2005	Kitt Peak	Spacewatch	RAF	1.5 km	MPC · JPL
177767	2005 JR_{128}	—	May 13, 2005	Kitt Peak	Spacewatch	·	1.2 km	MPC · JPL
177768	2005 JX_{137}	—	May 13, 2005	Kitt Peak	Spacewatch	·	1.0 km	MPC · JPL
177769	2005 JZ_{145}	—	May 13, 2005	Mount Lemmon	Mount Lemmon Survey	·	1.7 km	MPC · JPL
177770 Saulanwu	2005 JE_{163}	Saulanwu	May 8, 2005	Mount Lemmon	Mount Lemmon Survey	·	2.0 km	MPC · JPL
177771 Bretz	2005 JA_{165}	Bretz	May 10, 2005	Mount Lemmon	Mount Lemmon Survey	·	1.7 km	MPC · JPL
177772	2005 JJ_{168}	—	May 8, 2005	Mount Lemmon	Mount Lemmon Survey	slow	2.0 km	MPC · JPL
177773	2005 JT_{176}	—	May 12, 2005	Anderson Mesa	LONEOS	·	1.6 km	MPC · JPL
177774	2005 KD_{1}	—	May 16, 2005	Kitt Peak	Spacewatch	V	1.0 km	MPC · JPL
177775	2005 KB_{2}	—	May 16, 2005	Mount Lemmon	Mount Lemmon Survey	V	1.1 km	MPC · JPL
177776	2005 KJ_{5}	—	May 18, 2005	Siding Spring	SSS	·	970 m	MPC · JPL
177777	2005 KM_{6}	—	May 18, 2005	Palomar	NEAT	·	810 m	MPC · JPL
177778	2005 KX_{6}	—	May 19, 2005	Mount Lemmon	Mount Lemmon Survey	NYS	1.6 km	MPC · JPL
177779	2005 KP_{8}	—	May 18, 2005	Siding Spring	SSS	·	1.1 km	MPC · JPL
177780	2005 KK_{10}	—	May 29, 2005	Siding Spring	SSS	NYS	1.9 km	MPC · JPL
177781	2005 KJ_{13}	—	May 22, 2005	Palomar	NEAT	NYS	1.8 km	MPC · JPL
177782	2005 LG_{1}	—	June 3, 2005	Reedy Creek	J. Broughton	NYS	1.4 km	MPC · JPL
177783	2005 LF_{2}	—	June 2, 2005	Catalina	CSS	·	1.2 km	MPC · JPL
177784	2005 LY_{9}	—	June 2, 2005	Siding Spring	SSS	ERI	2.1 km	MPC · JPL
177785	2005 LH_{12}	—	June 5, 2005	Socorro	LINEAR	(2076)	1.1 km	MPC · JPL
177786	2005 LQ_{15}	—	June 5, 2005	Socorro	LINEAR	·	950 m	MPC · JPL
177787	2005 LB_{18}	—	June 6, 2005	Kitt Peak	Spacewatch	·	1.6 km	MPC · JPL
177788	2005 LB_{19}	—	June 8, 2005	Kitt Peak	Spacewatch	·	1.7 km	MPC · JPL
177789	2005 LH_{19}	—	June 8, 2005	Kitt Peak	Spacewatch	·	2.3 km	MPC · JPL
177790	2005 LD_{21}	—	June 5, 2005	Socorro	LINEAR	NYS	1.6 km	MPC · JPL
177791	2005 LJ_{22}	—	June 8, 2005	Kitt Peak	Spacewatch	(2076)	1.2 km	MPC · JPL
177792	2005 LW_{22}	—	June 8, 2005	Kitt Peak	Spacewatch	KOR	2.1 km	MPC · JPL
177793	2005 LH_{24}	—	June 6, 2005	Kitt Peak	Spacewatch	·	1.3 km	MPC · JPL
177794	2005 LS_{25}	—	June 8, 2005	Kitt Peak	Spacewatch	·	2.4 km	MPC · JPL
177795	2005 LH_{27}	—	June 9, 2005	Kitt Peak	Spacewatch	·	1.0 km	MPC · JPL
177796	2005 LO_{35}	—	June 10, 2005	Kitt Peak	Spacewatch	·	2.2 km	MPC · JPL
177797	2005 LJ_{39}	—	June 11, 2005	Kitt Peak	Spacewatch	·	2.9 km	MPC · JPL
177798	2005 LR_{45}	—	June 13, 2005	Mount Lemmon	Mount Lemmon Survey	·	3.1 km	MPC · JPL
177799	2005 LW_{45}	—	June 13, 2005	Kitt Peak	Spacewatch	EUN	2.1 km	MPC · JPL
177800	2005 LT_{49}	—	June 11, 2005	Catalina	CSS	(2076)	1.2 km	MPC · JPL

== 177801–177900 ==
back to top

Designation			Discovery			Properties		Ref
Permanent	Provisional	Named after	Date	Site	Discoverer(s)	Category	Diam.	Ref
177801	2005 LA_{50}	—	June 11, 2005	Kitt Peak	Spacewatch	·	2.6 km	MPC · JPL
177802	2005 LP_{50}	—	June 13, 2005	Mount Lemmon	Mount Lemmon Survey	·	2.1 km	MPC · JPL
177803	2005 LX_{50}	—	June 13, 2005	Mount Lemmon	Mount Lemmon Survey	·	3.4 km	MPC · JPL
177804	2005 LW_{52}	—	June 1, 2005	Kitt Peak	Spacewatch	·	2.1 km	MPC · JPL
177805	2005 LC_{53}	—	June 1, 2005	Kitt Peak	Spacewatch	·	2.1 km	MPC · JPL
177806	2005 MU	—	June 17, 2005	Mount Lemmon	Mount Lemmon Survey	·	3.3 km	MPC · JPL
177807	2005 MF_{1}	—	June 17, 2005	Mount Lemmon	Mount Lemmon Survey	EOS	2.6 km	MPC · JPL
177808	2005 MF_{2}	—	June 16, 2005	Kitt Peak	Spacewatch	·	3.5 km	MPC · JPL
177809	2005 MO_{2}	—	June 17, 2005	Kitt Peak	Spacewatch	MAR	1.6 km	MPC · JPL
177810	2005 MW_{8}	—	June 28, 2005	Kitt Peak	Spacewatch	·	2.2 km	MPC · JPL
177811	2005 MN_{12}	—	June 28, 2005	Palomar	NEAT	HYG	4.6 km	MPC · JPL
177812	2005 MU_{16}	—	June 27, 2005	Kitt Peak	Spacewatch	·	2.1 km	MPC · JPL
177813	2005 MC_{17}	—	June 27, 2005	Kitt Peak	Spacewatch	·	2.3 km	MPC · JPL
177814	2005 ME_{17}	—	June 27, 2005	Kitt Peak	Spacewatch	THM	4.0 km	MPC · JPL
177815	2005 MJ_{21}	—	June 30, 2005	Palomar	NEAT	·	1.6 km	MPC · JPL
177816	2005 MK_{24}	—	June 30, 2005	Kitt Peak	Spacewatch	·	3.2 km	MPC · JPL
177817	2005 MB_{31}	—	June 30, 2005	Kitt Peak	Spacewatch	·	1.8 km	MPC · JPL
177818	2005 MA_{35}	—	June 30, 2005	Kitt Peak	Spacewatch	·	3.4 km	MPC · JPL
177819	2005 MW_{43}	—	June 27, 2005	Palomar	NEAT	·	1.5 km	MPC · JPL
177820	2005 MG_{53}	—	June 29, 2005	Palomar	NEAT	·	2.9 km	MPC · JPL
177821	2005 NL_{3}	—	July 1, 2005	Kitt Peak	Spacewatch	TIR	5.1 km	MPC · JPL
177822	2005 NQ_{12}	—	July 4, 2005	Mount Lemmon	Mount Lemmon Survey	EOS	2.7 km	MPC · JPL
177823	2005 NB_{13}	—	July 4, 2005	Palomar	NEAT	·	4.1 km	MPC · JPL
177824	2005 NB_{15}	—	July 6, 2005	Junk Bond	D. Healy	MAS	990 m	MPC · JPL
177825	2005 NM_{16}	—	July 2, 2005	Kitt Peak	Spacewatch	·	2.2 km	MPC · JPL
177826	2005 NM_{18}	—	July 4, 2005	Mount Lemmon	Mount Lemmon Survey	HYG	3.3 km	MPC · JPL
177827	2005 NY_{18}	—	July 4, 2005	Mount Lemmon	Mount Lemmon Survey	·	2.8 km	MPC · JPL
177828	2005 NS_{36}	—	July 6, 2005	Kitt Peak	Spacewatch	·	2.1 km	MPC · JPL
177829	2005 NC_{43}	—	July 5, 2005	Palomar	NEAT	EOS	2.6 km	MPC · JPL
177830 Rubenhagen	2005 NL_{44}	Rubenhagen	July 9, 2005	Jarnac	Glinos, T.	·	6.1 km	MPC · JPL
177831	2005 NQ_{47}	—	July 7, 2005	Kitt Peak	Spacewatch	·	2.4 km	MPC · JPL
177832	2005 NX_{50}	—	July 6, 2005	Kitt Peak	Spacewatch	·	3.0 km	MPC · JPL
177833	2005 NJ_{52}	—	July 10, 2005	Catalina	CSS	·	2.0 km	MPC · JPL
177834	2005 NW_{55}	—	July 11, 2005	RAS	Lowe, A.	·	5.6 km	MPC · JPL
177835	2005 NM_{59}	—	July 9, 2005	Kitt Peak	Spacewatch	·	2.6 km	MPC · JPL
177836	2005 NU_{65}	—	July 1, 2005	Kitt Peak	Spacewatch	KOR	1.7 km	MPC · JPL
177837	2005 NU_{69}	—	July 4, 2005	Palomar	NEAT	VER	4.2 km	MPC · JPL
177838	2005 NZ_{69}	—	July 4, 2005	Mount Lemmon	Mount Lemmon Survey	EOS	3.0 km	MPC · JPL
177839	2005 NB_{73}	—	July 8, 2005	Kitt Peak	Spacewatch	·	2.2 km	MPC · JPL
177840	2005 NR_{75}	—	July 10, 2005	Kitt Peak	Spacewatch	NYS	1.8 km	MPC · JPL
177841	2005 ND_{80}	—	July 10, 2005	Reedy Creek	J. Broughton	·	4.9 km	MPC · JPL
177842	2005 NA_{96}	—	July 7, 2005	Kitt Peak	Spacewatch	·	2.5 km	MPC · JPL
177843	2005 NJ_{122}	—	July 5, 2005	Palomar	NEAT	·	2.3 km	MPC · JPL
177844	2005 NL_{122}	—	July 12, 2005	Mount Lemmon	Mount Lemmon Survey	·	3.4 km	MPC · JPL
177845	2005 OZ_{9}	—	July 27, 2005	Palomar	NEAT	·	4.5 km	MPC · JPL
177846	2005 OD_{10}	—	July 27, 2005	Palomar	NEAT	·	5.2 km	MPC · JPL
177847	2005 OV_{18}	—	July 30, 2005	Palomar	NEAT	·	2.9 km	MPC · JPL
177848	2005 OV_{19}	—	July 28, 2005	Palomar	NEAT	·	3.3 km	MPC · JPL
177849	2005 OG_{24}	—	July 30, 2005	Palomar	NEAT	·	4.2 km	MPC · JPL
177850	2005 OM_{24}	—	July 30, 2005	Palomar	NEAT	·	3.7 km	MPC · JPL
177851	2005 OC_{26}	—	July 28, 2005	Palomar	NEAT	·	2.4 km	MPC · JPL
177852	2005 OZ_{26}	—	July 30, 2005	Palomar	NEAT	·	4.5 km	MPC · JPL
177853 Lumezzane	2005 PQ_{3}	Lumezzane	August 5, 2005	Lumezzane	M. Micheli, Pizzetti, G. P.	EUN	1.1 km	MPC · JPL
177854	2005 PY_{5}	—	August 4, 2005	Kingsnake	J. V. McClusky	·	3.8 km	MPC · JPL
177855	2005 PL_{19}	—	August 5, 2005	Palomar	NEAT	·	2.6 km	MPC · JPL
177856	2005 PN_{19}	—	August 5, 2005	Palomar	NEAT	HOF	4.2 km	MPC · JPL
177857	2005 PP_{19}	—	August 5, 2005	Palomar	NEAT	·	3.7 km	MPC · JPL
177858	2005 QX	—	August 22, 2005	Palomar	NEAT	EOS	3.0 km	MPC · JPL
177859	2005 QB_{3}	—	August 24, 2005	Palomar	NEAT	·	3.9 km	MPC · JPL
177860	2005 QG_{3}	—	August 24, 2005	Palomar	NEAT	·	4.4 km	MPC · JPL
177861	2005 QM_{9}	—	August 25, 2005	Palomar	NEAT	HYG	3.8 km	MPC · JPL
177862	2005 QE_{13}	—	August 24, 2005	Palomar	NEAT	·	3.6 km	MPC · JPL
177863	2005 QE_{16}	—	August 25, 2005	Palomar	NEAT	EOS	2.4 km	MPC · JPL
177864	2005 QG_{19}	—	August 25, 2005	Campo Imperatore	CINEOS	TEL	2.0 km	MPC · JPL
177865	2005 QU_{20}	—	August 26, 2005	Anderson Mesa	LONEOS	·	2.8 km	MPC · JPL
177866 Barrau	2005 QL_{28}	Barrau	August 28, 2005	Vicques	M. Ory	HOF	3.8 km	MPC · JPL
177867	2005 QV_{31}	—	August 24, 2005	Palomar	NEAT	·	3.6 km	MPC · JPL
177868	2005 QR_{33}	—	August 25, 2005	Palomar	NEAT	KOR	2.0 km	MPC · JPL
177869	2005 QN_{45}	—	August 26, 2005	Palomar	NEAT	·	5.8 km	MPC · JPL
177870	2005 QR_{46}	—	August 26, 2005	Palomar	NEAT	·	4.7 km	MPC · JPL
177871	2005 QQ_{48}	—	August 26, 2005	Palomar	NEAT	·	4.9 km	MPC · JPL
177872	2005 QV_{58}	—	August 25, 2005	Palomar	NEAT	·	5.0 km	MPC · JPL
177873	2005 QR_{70}	—	August 29, 2005	Socorro	LINEAR	·	5.3 km	MPC · JPL
177874	2005 QM_{74}	—	August 29, 2005	Anderson Mesa	LONEOS	·	3.9 km	MPC · JPL
177875	2005 QS_{78}	—	August 25, 2005	Palomar	NEAT	·	3.4 km	MPC · JPL
177876	2005 QW_{83}	—	August 29, 2005	Anderson Mesa	LONEOS	·	4.3 km	MPC · JPL
177877	2005 QB_{95}	—	August 27, 2005	Palomar	NEAT	·	3.7 km	MPC · JPL
177878	2005 QO_{101}	—	August 27, 2005	Palomar	NEAT	·	4.2 km	MPC · JPL
177879	2005 QH_{104}	—	August 27, 2005	Palomar	NEAT	CYB	4.9 km	MPC · JPL
177880	2005 QD_{109}	—	August 27, 2005	Palomar	NEAT	·	3.4 km	MPC · JPL
177881	2005 QA_{113}	—	August 27, 2005	Palomar	NEAT	·	4.5 km	MPC · JPL
177882	2005 QH_{113}	—	August 27, 2005	Palomar	NEAT	·	3.6 km	MPC · JPL
177883	2005 QA_{119}	—	August 28, 2005	Kitt Peak	Spacewatch	·	3.2 km	MPC · JPL
177884	2005 QS_{124}	—	August 28, 2005	Kitt Peak	Spacewatch	·	2.7 km	MPC · JPL
177885	2005 QD_{137}	—	August 28, 2005	Kitt Peak	Spacewatch	·	4.2 km	MPC · JPL
177886	2005 QN_{138}	—	August 28, 2005	Kitt Peak	Spacewatch	·	5.9 km	MPC · JPL
177887	2005 QC_{141}	—	August 29, 2005	Anderson Mesa	LONEOS	·	3.2 km	MPC · JPL
177888	2005 QE_{142}	—	August 30, 2005	Socorro	LINEAR	·	7.2 km	MPC · JPL
177889	2005 QZ_{143}	—	August 26, 2005	Palomar	NEAT	·	5.1 km	MPC · JPL
177890	2005 QP_{146}	—	August 28, 2005	Siding Spring	SSS	·	3.1 km	MPC · JPL
177891	2005 QK_{159}	—	August 28, 2005	Anderson Mesa	LONEOS	·	4.8 km	MPC · JPL
177892	2005 QE_{163}	—	August 30, 2005	Anderson Mesa	LONEOS	·	3.2 km	MPC · JPL
177893	2005 QP_{170}	—	August 29, 2005	Palomar	NEAT	EOS	3.2 km	MPC · JPL
177894	2005 QY_{177}	—	August 31, 2005	Palomar	NEAT	HYG	3.1 km	MPC · JPL
177895	2005 QU_{178}	—	August 29, 2005	Anderson Mesa	LONEOS	CYB	6.0 km	MPC · JPL
177896	2005 RD_{6}	—	September 6, 2005	Socorro	LINEAR	·	4.7 km	MPC · JPL
177897	2005 RK_{6}	—	September 7, 2005	Altschwendt	Altschwendt	·	5.6 km	MPC · JPL
177898	2005 RX_{7}	—	September 8, 2005	Socorro	LINEAR	3:2	7.9 km	MPC · JPL
177899	2005 RG_{23}	—	September 9, 2005	Socorro	LINEAR	·	5.3 km	MPC · JPL
177900	2005 RS_{30}	—	September 11, 2005	Kitt Peak	Spacewatch	·	3.9 km	MPC · JPL

== 177901–178000 ==
back to top

Designation			Discovery			Properties		Ref
Permanent	Provisional	Named after	Date	Site	Discoverer(s)	Category	Diam.	Ref
177901	2005 RZ_{37}	—	September 3, 2005	Mauna Kea	Veillet, C.	VER	5.3 km	MPC · JPL
177902	2005 RG_{40}	—	September 6, 2005	Anderson Mesa	LONEOS	EOS	3.4 km	MPC · JPL
177903	2005 RD_{41}	—	September 12, 2005	Kitt Peak	Spacewatch	·	3.1 km	MPC · JPL
177904	2005 SV_{5}	—	September 23, 2005	Catalina	CSS	·	5.8 km	MPC · JPL
177905	2005 SA_{11}	—	September 23, 2005	Kitt Peak	Spacewatch	HYG	4.1 km	MPC · JPL
177906	2005 SO_{19}	—	September 25, 2005	Calvin-Rehoboth	Calvin College	·	3.6 km	MPC · JPL
177907	2005 SF_{67}	—	September 27, 2005	Kitt Peak	Spacewatch	·	5.3 km	MPC · JPL
177908	2005 SN_{77}	—	September 24, 2005	Kitt Peak	Spacewatch	KOR	2.1 km	MPC · JPL
177909	2005 SX_{96}	—	September 25, 2005	Palomar	NEAT	·	3.6 km	MPC · JPL
177910	2005 SA_{114}	—	September 27, 2005	Kitt Peak	Spacewatch	·	4.4 km	MPC · JPL
177911	2005 SF_{117}	—	September 28, 2005	Palomar	NEAT	·	4.4 km	MPC · JPL
177912	2005 SO_{122}	—	September 29, 2005	Palomar	NEAT	·	4.4 km	MPC · JPL
177913	2005 SN_{139}	—	September 25, 2005	Kitt Peak	Spacewatch	·	4.0 km	MPC · JPL
177914	2005 SX_{142}	—	September 25, 2005	Kitt Peak	Spacewatch	·	1.9 km	MPC · JPL
177915	2005 SQ_{159}	—	September 26, 2005	Palomar	NEAT	·	5.5 km	MPC · JPL
177916	2005 SY_{166}	—	September 28, 2005	Palomar	NEAT	·	4.5 km	MPC · JPL
177917	2005 SY_{178}	—	September 29, 2005	Anderson Mesa	LONEOS	EOS	3.0 km	MPC · JPL
177918	2005 SL_{181}	—	September 29, 2005	Mount Lemmon	Mount Lemmon Survey	·	3.7 km	MPC · JPL
177919	2005 SN_{190}	—	September 29, 2005	Anderson Mesa	LONEOS	VER	6.7 km	MPC · JPL
177920	2005 SG_{225}	—	September 29, 2005	Palomar	NEAT	CYB	6.7 km	MPC · JPL
177921	2005 SE_{233}	—	September 30, 2005	Mount Lemmon	Mount Lemmon Survey	·	5.3 km	MPC · JPL
177922	2005 SD_{244}	—	September 30, 2005	Mount Lemmon	Mount Lemmon Survey	EOS	2.6 km	MPC · JPL
177923	2005 SL_{245}	—	September 30, 2005	Mount Lemmon	Mount Lemmon Survey	THM	3.5 km	MPC · JPL
177924	2005 SV_{246}	—	September 30, 2005	Kitt Peak	Spacewatch	·	4.4 km	MPC · JPL
177925	2005 SV_{252}	—	September 24, 2005	Palomar	NEAT	URS	6.4 km	MPC · JPL
177926	2005 SP_{258}	—	September 23, 2005	Catalina	CSS	EOS	2.6 km	MPC · JPL
177927	2005 SP_{259}	—	September 25, 2005	Catalina	CSS	EOS	4.1 km	MPC · JPL
177928	2005 SK_{260}	—	September 23, 2005	Kitt Peak	Spacewatch	EOS	2.4 km	MPC · JPL
177929	2005 TE_{2}	—	October 1, 2005	Catalina	CSS	MRX	1.6 km	MPC · JPL
177930	2005 TH_{43}	—	October 5, 2005	Socorro	LINEAR	·	3.0 km	MPC · JPL
177931	2005 TD_{56}	—	October 1, 2005	Kitt Peak	Spacewatch	·	5.3 km	MPC · JPL
177932	2005 TW_{73}	—	October 7, 2005	Anderson Mesa	LONEOS	·	3.8 km	MPC · JPL
177933	2005 TR_{75}	—	October 3, 2005	Catalina	CSS	·	2.6 km	MPC · JPL
177934	2005 TQ_{101}	—	October 7, 2005	Catalina	CSS	·	4.7 km	MPC · JPL
177935	2005 TS_{111}	—	October 7, 2005	Kitt Peak	Spacewatch	·	3.8 km	MPC · JPL
177936	2005 UD_{10}	—	October 21, 2005	Palomar	NEAT	·	4.8 km	MPC · JPL
177937	2005 UD_{49}	—	October 23, 2005	Catalina	CSS	·	6.9 km	MPC · JPL
177938	2005 UJ_{121}	—	October 24, 2005	Kitt Peak	Spacewatch	·	4.5 km	MPC · JPL
177939	2005 UV_{137}	—	October 25, 2005	Mount Lemmon	Mount Lemmon Survey	·	2.6 km	MPC · JPL
177940	2005 UC_{144}	—	October 26, 2005	Kitt Peak	Spacewatch	3:2 · SHU	6.8 km	MPC · JPL
177941	2005 UR_{265}	—	October 27, 2005	Kitt Peak	Spacewatch	3:2	7.6 km	MPC · JPL
177942	2005 VP_{17}	—	November 4, 2005	Mount Lemmon	Mount Lemmon Survey	·	5.6 km	MPC · JPL
177943	2005 VZ_{17}	—	November 1, 2005	Kitt Peak	Spacewatch	3:2 · SHU	10 km	MPC · JPL
177944	2005 VM_{64}	—	November 1, 2005	Mount Lemmon	Mount Lemmon Survey	·	3.4 km	MPC · JPL
177945	2005 WO_{60}	—	November 25, 2005	Palomar	NEAT	·	3.8 km	MPC · JPL
177946	2005 WG_{68}	—	November 25, 2005	Mount Lemmon	Mount Lemmon Survey	·	4.9 km	MPC · JPL
177947	2006 JS_{6}	—	May 1, 2006	Kitt Peak	Spacewatch	·	1.7 km	MPC · JPL
177948	2006 KV	—	May 18, 2006	Palomar	NEAT	NYS	1.4 km	MPC · JPL
177949	2006 KU_{96}	—	May 25, 2006	Kitt Peak	Spacewatch	·	2.2 km	MPC · JPL
177950	2006 KW_{96}	—	May 25, 2006	Mount Lemmon	Mount Lemmon Survey	·	1.1 km	MPC · JPL
177951	2006 KM_{114}	—	May 24, 2006	Catalina	CSS	H	780 m	MPC · JPL
177952	2006 KX_{123}	—	May 25, 2006	Catalina	CSS	·	2.8 km	MPC · JPL
177953	2006 MQ_{6}	—	June 20, 2006	Catalina	CSS	·	1.8 km	MPC · JPL
177954	2006 OA	—	July 16, 2006	Eskridge	Tibbets, D., G. Hug	EUN	1.7 km	MPC · JPL
177955	2006 OP_{4}	—	July 21, 2006	Mount Lemmon	Mount Lemmon Survey	·	4.1 km	MPC · JPL
177956	2006 OQ_{7}	—	July 19, 2006	Palomar	NEAT	·	1.6 km	MPC · JPL
177957	2006 OC_{14}	—	July 21, 2006	Palomar	NEAT	·	990 m	MPC · JPL
177958	2006 PX_{3}	—	August 14, 2006	Reedy Creek	J. Broughton	·	1.6 km	MPC · JPL
177959	2006 PP_{5}	—	August 12, 2006	Palomar	NEAT	·	790 m	MPC · JPL
177960	2006 PF_{7}	—	August 12, 2006	Palomar	NEAT	·	1.0 km	MPC · JPL
177961	2006 PQ_{8}	—	August 13, 2006	Palomar	NEAT	·	1.8 km	MPC · JPL
177962	2006 PN_{14}	—	August 15, 2006	Palomar	NEAT	·	3.2 km	MPC · JPL
177963	2006 PR_{16}	—	August 15, 2006	Palomar	NEAT	·	1.2 km	MPC · JPL
177964	2006 PE_{19}	—	August 13, 2006	Palomar	NEAT	·	850 m	MPC · JPL
177965	2006 PP_{22}	—	August 14, 2006	Siding Spring	SSS	·	2.4 km	MPC · JPL
177966	2006 PW_{22}	—	August 15, 2006	Palomar	NEAT	·	950 m	MPC · JPL
177967 Chouchihkang	2006 PY_{32}	Chouchihkang	August 15, 2006	Lulin Observatory	Lin, H.-C., Q. Ye	V	890 m	MPC · JPL
177968	2006 PK_{39}	—	August 14, 2006	Palomar	NEAT	·	2.4 km	MPC · JPL
177969	2006 PM_{40}	—	August 14, 2006	Palomar	NEAT	·	1.7 km	MPC · JPL
177970	2006 PC_{41}	—	August 14, 2006	Palomar	NEAT	·	2.0 km	MPC · JPL
177971	2006 QC	—	August 17, 2006	Hibiscus	S. F. Hönig	·	1.0 km	MPC · JPL
177972	2006 QL_{2}	—	August 17, 2006	Palomar	NEAT	·	2.5 km	MPC · JPL
177973	2006 QO_{7}	—	August 18, 2006	Kitt Peak	Spacewatch	(5)	3.0 km	MPC · JPL
177974	2006 QS_{8}	—	August 19, 2006	Kitt Peak	Spacewatch	V	950 m	MPC · JPL
177975	2006 QR_{19}	—	August 17, 2006	Palomar	NEAT	MAR	1.7 km	MPC · JPL
177976	2006 QR_{20}	—	August 18, 2006	Anderson Mesa	LONEOS	·	1.6 km	MPC · JPL
177977	2006 QV_{20}	—	August 18, 2006	Anderson Mesa	LONEOS	EUN	2.3 km	MPC · JPL
177978	2006 QE_{23}	—	August 19, 2006	Palomar	NEAT	·	1.9 km	MPC · JPL
177979	2006 QV_{24}	—	August 17, 2006	Palomar	NEAT	(21344)	3.0 km	MPC · JPL
177980	2006 QC_{28}	—	August 20, 2006	Kitt Peak	Spacewatch	(5)	1.7 km	MPC · JPL
177981	2006 QO_{28}	—	August 21, 2006	Socorro	LINEAR	·	1.9 km	MPC · JPL
177982 Popilnia	2006 QE_{34}	Popilnia	August 17, 2006	Andrushivka	Andrushivka	·	1.3 km	MPC · JPL
177983	2006 QE_{37}	—	August 17, 2006	Palomar	NEAT	·	5.1 km	MPC · JPL
177984	2006 QU_{42}	—	August 17, 2006	Palomar	NEAT	·	1.5 km	MPC · JPL
177985	2006 QV_{42}	—	August 17, 2006	Palomar	NEAT	V	970 m	MPC · JPL
177986	2006 QM_{43}	—	August 18, 2006	Kitt Peak	Spacewatch	·	2.1 km	MPC · JPL
177987	2006 QP_{43}	—	August 18, 2006	Kitt Peak	Spacewatch	·	1.4 km	MPC · JPL
177988	2006 QV_{45}	—	August 19, 2006	Anderson Mesa	LONEOS	·	2.9 km	MPC · JPL
177989	2006 QX_{46}	—	August 20, 2006	Palomar	NEAT	V	1.2 km	MPC · JPL
177990	2006 QP_{48}	—	August 21, 2006	Socorro	LINEAR	·	1.2 km	MPC · JPL
177991	2006 QA_{49}	—	August 21, 2006	Kitt Peak	Spacewatch	·	910 m	MPC · JPL
177992	2006 QP_{56}	—	August 21, 2006	Kitt Peak	Spacewatch	DOR	3.5 km	MPC · JPL
177993	2006 QW_{57}	—	August 24, 2006	Socorro	LINEAR	·	9.1 km	MPC · JPL
177994	2006 QP_{63}	—	August 24, 2006	Socorro	LINEAR	·	1.8 km	MPC · JPL
177995	2006 QB_{66}	—	August 28, 2006	Socorro	LINEAR	H	1.0 km	MPC · JPL
177996	2006 QT_{76}	—	August 21, 2006	Kitt Peak	Spacewatch	·	1.1 km	MPC · JPL
177997	2006 QZ_{88}	—	August 27, 2006	Kitt Peak	Spacewatch	·	1.4 km	MPC · JPL
177998	2006 QK_{113}	—	August 24, 2006	Socorro	LINEAR	·	1.2 km	MPC · JPL
177999	2006 QL_{115}	—	August 27, 2006	Anderson Mesa	LONEOS	EUN	1.5 km	MPC · JPL
178000	2006 QT_{117}	—	August 27, 2006	Anderson Mesa	LONEOS	·	2.8 km	MPC · JPL

back to top

== See also ==
- Meanings of minor-planet names: 177001–178000
