= Meanings of minor-planet names: 177001–178000 =

As minor planet discoveries are confirmed, they are given a permanent number by the IAU's Minor Planet Center (MPC), and the discoverers can then submit names for them, following the IAU's naming conventions. The list below concerns those minor planets in the specified number-range that have received names, and explains the meanings of those names.

Official naming citations of newly named small Solar System bodies are approved and published in a bulletin by IAU's Working Group for Small Bodies Nomenclature (WGSBN). Before May 2021, citations were published in MPC's Minor Planet Circulars for many decades. Recent citations can also be found on the JPL Small-Body Database (SBDB). Until his death in 2016, German astronomer Lutz D. Schmadel compiled these citations into the Dictionary of Minor Planet Names (DMP) and regularly updated the collection.

Based on Paul Herget's The Names of the Minor Planets, Schmadel also researched the unclear origin of numerous asteroids, most of which had been named prior to World War II. This article incorporates text from this source, which is in the public domain: SBDB New namings may only be added to this list below after official publication as the preannouncement of names is condemned. The WGSBN publishes a comprehensive guideline for the naming rules of non-cometary small Solar System bodies.

== 177001–177100 ==
Named minor planet	Provisional	This minor planet was named for...	Ref · Catalog
177065 Samuelnoah	2003 FP_{7}	Twins Samuel Rodriguez (born 2019) and Noah Rodriguez (born 2019) are great-grandchildren of James Whitney Young, who discovered this minor planet.	JPL · 177065

== 177101–177200 ==
back to top

Named minor planet	Provisional	This minor planet was named for...	Ref · Catalog
177120 Ocampo Uría	2003 GZ_{51}	Adriana Ocampo (born 1955) was the NASA Headquarters Program Program Executive for the New Horizons mission to Pluto.	JPL · 177120
177148 Pätzold	2003 QJ_{85}	Martin Pätzold (born 1960), Max Planck Institute, worked as a Science Team Collaborator for radio science for the New Horizons mission to Pluto.	JPL · 177148
177157 Skoffelza	2003 SF_{33}	Elza Skoff (1905–1983), a Hungarian radio announcer at Radio Budapest.	IAU · 177157

== 177201–177300 ==
back to top

Named minor planet	Provisional	This minor planet was named for...	Ref · Catalog
There are no named minor planets in this number range

== 177301–177400 ==
back to top

Named minor planet	Provisional	This minor planet was named for...	Ref · Catalog
There are no named minor planets in this number range

== 177401–177500 ==
back to top

Named minor planet	Provisional	This minor planet was named for...	Ref · Catalog
177415 Queloz	2004 CK_{3}	Didier Queloz (born 1966), Swiss astrophysicist at Geneva University known for the discovery of 51 Pegasi b, the first extrasolar planet around a main-sequence start	JPL · 177415

== 177501–177600 ==
back to top

Named minor planet	Provisional	This minor planet was named for...	Ref · Catalog
There are no named minor planets in this number range

== 177601–177700 ==
back to top

Named minor planet	Provisional	This minor planet was named for...	Ref · Catalog
177625 Dembicky	2004 JD	Jack M. Dembicky (born 1966) was the telescope operations specialist, and is now the support astronomer at New Mexico's Apache Point Observatory. He was the lead 2MASS telescope operator at the F. L. Whipple Observatory at Mount Hopkins, AZ (1997–2000). He has an M.S. in physics (1996) from Wichita State University.	IAU · 177625
177659 Paolacel	2005 CE_{77}	Paola Celletti (born 1956), Italian architect from the University of Rome "La Sapienza". She has been an amateur astronomer and involved in public outreach.	JPL · 177659
177667 Schieven	2005 EV_{37}	Gerald Henry Moriarty Schieven (born 1958) is a Canadian astronomer who obtained his PhD at the University of Massachusetts, Amherst. Gerald was President of the RASC London Centre in 1980. He has worked at JPL, the James Clerk Maxwell Telescope and the Herzberg Millimetre Astronomy Group.	IAU · 177667

== 177701–177800 ==
back to top

Named minor planet	Provisional	This minor planet was named for...	Ref · Catalog
177722 Pelletier	2005 GJ_{205}	Frederic J. Pelletier (born 1974), a senior engineer at KinetX, who worked as Navigation Lead for the New Horizons mission to Pluto	JPL · 177722
177770 Saulanwu	2005 JE_{163}	Sau Lan Wu (b. 1940s) is a Chinese-American particle physicist. She is renowned for her integral leadership and participation in the discoveries of the charm quark, the [gluon], and the Higgs boson. Wu is the Enrico Fermi Distinguished Professor of Physics at the University of Wisconsin, Madison, and an experimentalist at CERN.	JPL · 177770
177771 Bretz	2005 JA_{165}	Harley “J Harlen” Bretz (1882–1981) was an American geologist. His fieldwork of the Channeled Scablands on the Columbia River Plateau led him to propose that the landscape resulted from cataclysmic flooding. His theory has been vindicated by decades of evidence and the discovery of the ancient glacial Lake Missoula as the flood source.	IAU · 177771

== 177801–177900 ==
back to top

Named minor planet	Provisional	This minor planet was named for...	Ref · Catalog
177830 Rubenhagen	2005 NL_{44}	David Alfred Rubenhagen (b. 1959), a Canadian amateur astronomer.	IAU · 177830
177853 Lumezzane	2005 PQ_{3}	Lumezzane, a small town in northern Italy, near Brescia	JPL · 177853
177866 Barrau	2005 QL_{28}	Aurélien Barrau (born 1973), French physicist and philosopher.	JPL · 177866

== 177901–178000 ==
back to top

Named minor planet	Provisional	This minor planet was named for...	Ref · Catalog
177967 Chouchihkang	2006 PY_{32}	Chih-Kang Chou (born 1935), a Chinese-born astronomer, who taught and conducted research in astronomy at the National Central University in Taiwan for 30 years.	JPL · 177967
177982 Popilnia	2006 QE_{34}	Popilnia Raion, a district of Zhytomyr Oblast, located in northwestern Ukrainian, and motherland of poet Maksym Rylsky	JPL · 177982

back to top

Preceded by 176,001–177,000	Meanings of minor-planet names List of minor planets: 177,001–178,000	Succeeded by 178,001–179,000
