= (177049) 2003 EE16 =

Near-Earth asteroid

(177049) 2003 EE_{16}
Discovery
- Discovered by: Spacewatch
- Discovery site: Kitt Peak National Obs.
- Discovery date: 8 March 2003

Designations
- Minor planet category: NEO · PHA · Apollo

Orbital characteristics
- Epoch 13 January 2016 (JD 2457400.5)
- Uncertainty parameter 0
- Observation arc: 4429 days (12.13 yr)
- Earliest precovery date: 17 May 2002
- Aphelion: 2.2878 AU (342.25 Gm)
- Perihelion: 0.54666 AU (81.779 Gm)
- Semi-major axis: 1.4172 AU (212.01 Gm)
- Eccentricity: 0.61427
- Orbital period (sidereal): 1.69 yr (616.24 d)
- Mean anomaly: 296.40°
- Mean motion: 0° 35^{m} 3.084^{s} / day
- Inclination: 0.64964°
- Longitude of ascending node: 127.04°
- Argument of perihelion: 259.67°
- Earth MOID: 9.93475×10^{−5} AU (1.486217×10^{4} km)

Physical characteristics
- Mean diameter: 0.320 km
- Mass: 5.1×10^{10} kg (assumed)
- Absolute magnitude (H): 19.7

(177049) 2003 EE_{16} is an Apollo near-Earth asteroid and potentially hazardous object. It was discovered on 8 March 2003 by LPL/Spacewatch II at an apparent magnitude of 20 using a 1.8-meter (71 in) reflecting telescope. It has an estimated diameter of 320 meters (1,050 ft). The asteroid was listed on Sentry Risk Table with a Torino Scale rating of 1 on 2 April 2003.

== Description ==
Many of the virtual impactors were located near the nominal orbital solution and the asteroid has a low inclination relative to Earth's orbit. Observation by the Very Large Telescope (VLT) 8 meter facilities on 22 May and 19 June 2003 when 2003 EE_{16} was very dim with an apparent magnitude between 24–25 (Note: At an apparent magnitude of 24, the asteroid was roughly 10 million times fainter than can be seen with the naked eye. Math: $(\sqrt[5]{100})^{24-6.5}= 10000000$) refined the orbit. It was removed from the Sentry Risk Table on 28 May 2003.

2003 EE_{16} has the smallest Earth Minimum orbit intersection distance (MOID) of any known potentially hazardous asteroid. The Earth MOID is 0.0000475 AU (7,110 km; 4,420 mi). Asteroids with a smaller Earth MOID are less than ~100 meters in diameter such as 2013 XY8 and 2010 TD54. Earth impactors 2008 TC3 and 2014 AA had small Earth MOID values as they were on their impact approach when discovered.

Close-approaches to Earth
Date	Distance from Earth
2014-07-01	0.0966 AU (14,450,000 km; 8,980,000 mi) (37.6 LD)
2041-07-01	0.0992 AU (14,840,000 km; 9,220,000 mi) (38.6 LD)
2067-01-31	0.0874 AU (13,070,000 km; 8,120,000 mi) (34.0 LD)
2094-01-30	0.0747 AU (11,170,000 km; 6,940,000 mi) (29.1 LD)
2122-07-04	0.0743 AU (11,120,000 km; 6,910,000 mi) (28.9 LD)
2149-07-06	0.0518 AU (7,750,000 km; 4,820,000 mi) (20.2 LD)
2175-02-02	0.0802 AU (12,000,000 km; 7,460,000 mi) (31.2 LD)
