= Ante Radonić =

Croatian astronomer (born 1951)

- Born: May 2, 1951 (age 74); Korčula, Croatia
- Occupation: astronomer

Ante Radonić (born May 2, 1951) is a Croatian astronomer and popularizer of astronomy, who writes for the weekly radio show Andromeda.

== Background ==
Radonić was born in Korčula, Croatia, where he finished primary school and high school. Between 1972 and 2017, he worked in the Technical Museum in Zagreb as a chairman of planetarium with astronautics. His major activity is popularization of astronomy and astronautics. He also has regular lectures in the planetarium for school groups and public lectures for citizens.

== Career ==
He has written over 300 articles for popular science magazines, weekly papers, and daily newspapers. But he has mostly written for a magazine of Zagreb stardom called Čovjek i svemir (English "Man and Universe"), a magazine of Croatia's nature society Priroda (English "Nature"), and daily newspapers Vjesnik and Večernji list.

Professor Ante Radonić has given over 500 public lectures about astronomy, astronautics and rocket science. He has given lectures across Croatia in Zagreb, Karlovac, Rijeka, Pula, Zadar, Obrovac, Šibenik, Prvić Luka, Ploče, Korčula, Čakovec, Koprivnica, Kutina, Križevci, Slavonski Brod, Bjelovar, Pitomača, Virovitica and Vinkovci.

Ante Radonić has had over 300 appearances on special shows on radio and over 50 appearances on TV shows. He is a permanent co-writer of a weekly show about the Universe called Andromeda (since 1996) on the second Croatian Radio station and can be heard every Tuesday at 20:00 - 22:00.

== Honors ==
Asteroid 176981 Anteradonic, discovered by astronomers with the Sloan Digital Sky Survey in 2002, was named in his honor. The official naming citation was published by IAU's WGSBN on 7 February 2022.
