= Prvić Luka =

Settlement in Šibenik-Knin County, Croatia

- Settlement
- Interactive map of Prvić Luka
- Location of Prvić Luka in Croatia
- Coordinates: 43°43′26″N 15°47′56″E
- Country: Croatia
- County: Šibenik-Knin
- City: Vodice

Area
  - Total: 4.8 km^{2} (1.9 sq mi)

Population (2021)
  - Total: 148
  - Density: 31/km^{2} (80/sq mi)
- Time zone: UTC+1 (CET)
  - Summer (DST): UTC+2 (CEST)
- Postal code: 22233 Prvić Luka
- Area code: +385 (0)22

Prvić Luka is a settlement in the City of Vodice in Croatia. In 2021, its population was 148. It is one of two settlements on the island of Prvić, the other being Prvić Šepurine.

Inventor Fausto Veranzio (Faust Vrančić in Croatian), born in nearby Šibenik, is buried on Prvić Luka. There is also a memorial centre for him in the village.

== Demographics ==
Prvić Luka: Population trends 1857–2021
v

| population | 793 | 923 | 961 | 1066 | 1336 | 1291 | 1400 | 1033 | 641 | 672 | 612 | 404 | 238 | 229 | 191 | 164 | 148 |
| | 1857 | 1869 | 1880 | 1890 | 1900 | 1910 | 1921 | 1931 | 1948 | 1953 | 1961 | 1971 | 1981 | 1991 | 2001 | 2011 | 2021 |

Sources: Croatian Bureau of Statistics publications
