= Andromeda (radio show) =

Croatian radio show

- Genre: Science talk radio / podcast
- Running time: 60-120 minutes
- Country of origin: Croatia: HRT – HR 2
- Language(s): Croatian
- Hosted by: Dubravka Družinec Ricijaš
- Original release: 1997.
- Website: radio.hrt.hr/emisija/andromeda/18/

Andromeda is a Croatian radio show covering topics in astronomy, astrophysics, and astronautics.

== History ==
The show was started by journalist Tanja Devčić and astronomer Ante Radonić, head of the planetarium at the Technical Museum in Zagreb. It has been broadcast since 1997 on the second program of Croatian Radio, every Tuesday from 8:00 pm to 10:00 pm. Over the years, the show has hosted numerous scientists such as Charles Duke and Mike Vucelić who participated in the Apollo project, while the most frequent guest is astronomer Korado Korlević.

At the end of August 2012, it was announced that the show was being canceled, or that the concept and the name itself were changing. However, the show continued to be recorded every week, at the Technical Museum in Zagreb. In June 2013, after editorial changes, the show began airing again as the second program of Croatian Radio.
