= Ante Antić =

Croatian Catholic priest and writer (1893–1956)

Venerable Ante Antić OFMC
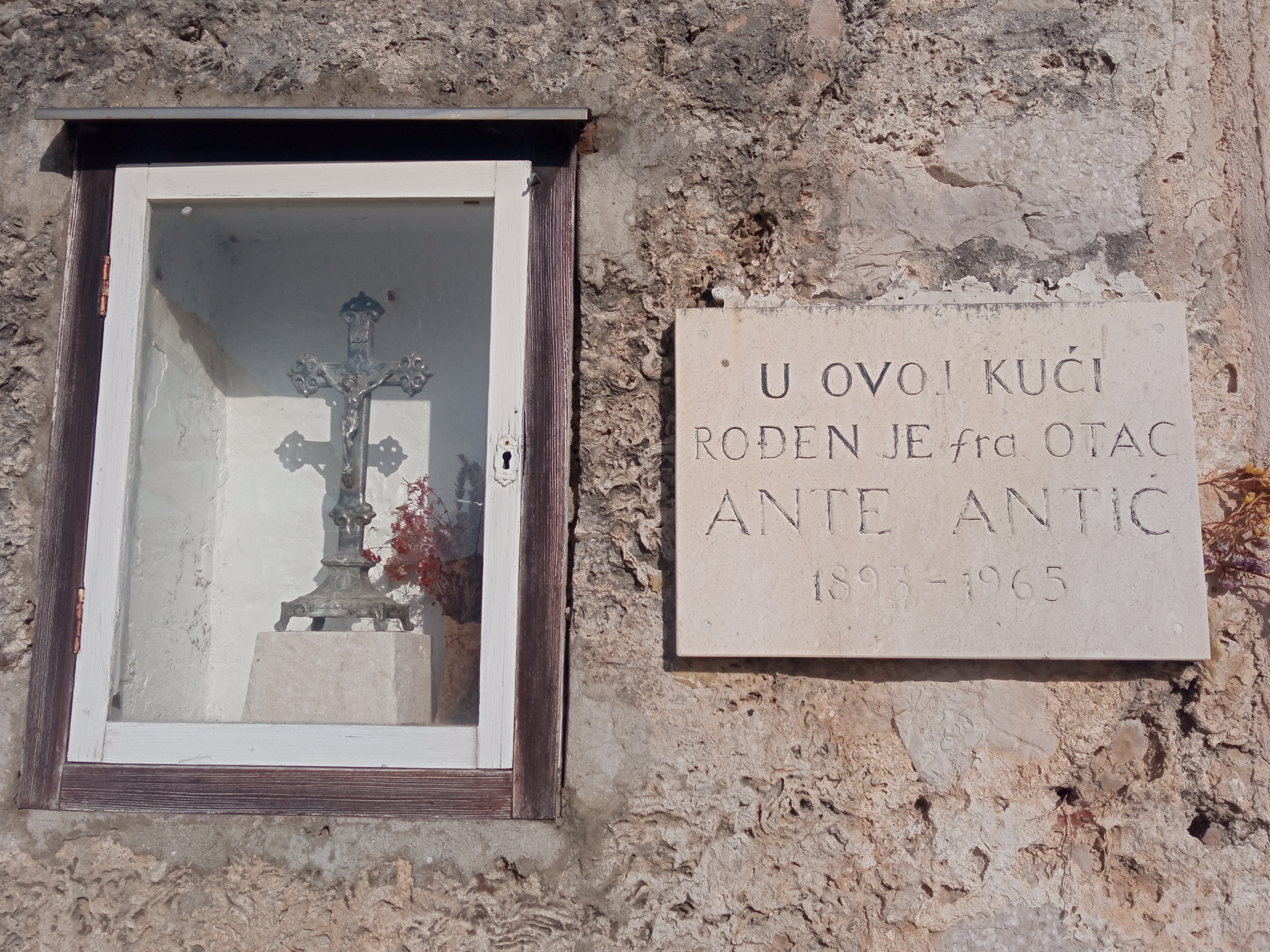
- Commemorative plaque at Antić's birth house in Prvić Šepurine.
- Born: April 16th, 1893; Prvić Šepurine
- Residence: Šibenik, Makarska, Zagreb
- Died: March 4th, 1965; Zagreb
- Cause of death: tuberculosis
- Venerated in: Catholic Church in Croatia
- Major shrine: Our Lady of Lourdes Church, Zagreb
- Feast: 4 March
- Influences: Francis of Assisi, John of the Cross, Teresa of Ávila, Thérèse of Lisieux, Charles of Sezze
- Major works: Pisma svećenika ("Priest's letters"); Svećenik sam Kristov ("Being Christ's Priest")

Venerable Ante Antić, OFMC (16 April 1893 – 4 March 1956) was a Croatian Catholic priest, Capuchin and spiritual writer, known for his spiritual leadership, confessions, and letters. According to Croatian Encyclopedia, he was a "charismatic figure in contemporary Croatian religious history". His beatification process was opened in 1984. He is known under the nickname "Dobri otac" ('Good Father').

== Biography ==
Antić was born in Prvić Šepurine village on Prvić island near Šibenik, in a family with nine children. During pregnancy, his mother found herself in a seastorm in which she prayed to Anthony of Padua, thus consequently naming him after the saint. He finished the first six grades of elementary school in Zaton. A year before going to seminary, he got tuberculosis, which followed him for his whole life. He entered the Franciscan seminary in Sinj in 1905 and novitiate in Visovac in 1911. He studied philosophy in Zaostrog and theology in Makarska, where he took his monastic vows. He was ordained for priest on 29 July 1917 in Šibenik.

He was a master of clergy in Makarska (1917–1945), in Visovac for a short time, and in Zagreb (1946–1956). For the last ten years of his life, he was a confessor and counselor at the Monastery of Our Lady of Lourdes in Zagreb (1956–1965).

His spiritual role models were Francis of Assisi, John of the Cross, Teresa of Ávila, Thérèse of Lisieux and Charles of Sezze, whose picture he kept above his bed. His life "motto" was "Everything for others, nothing for self, and all to the honor of God and the Lady!"

He died with a reputation for holiness. He was buried at Mirogoj on 8 March 1965, and the funeral rites were led by future Cardinal Franjo Kuharić, Archbishop of Zagreb. His burial was attended by several thousand people. In 1970, his remains were moved to the crypt of the Church of Our Lady of Lourdes in Zagreb. It was record that five years after his death his body was still intact.

== Works ==
Around 4000 of his letters are preserved, some of which were published in two works: Pisma svećenika ("Priest's letters"), and Svećenik sam Kristov ("Being Christ's Priest").

== Beatification ==
The beatification process was opened in 1984. The cause was opened by Cardinal Franjo Kuharić. The nihil obstat was published on 1 March 1985. The proceedings have been conducted in Rome since 1995. The Peritus in his cause was Fr. Ante Stantić. The proclamation of the validity of the proceedings was issued on 20 October 1995. The Positio was published in 2006. The proclamation of heroic virtues was published on 5 May 2015. At that time, he received the title of venerable Servant of God. The postulator is Fr. Giovangiuseppe Califano.
