= Charles of Sezze =

Christian saint

Saint Charles of Sezze O.F.M.
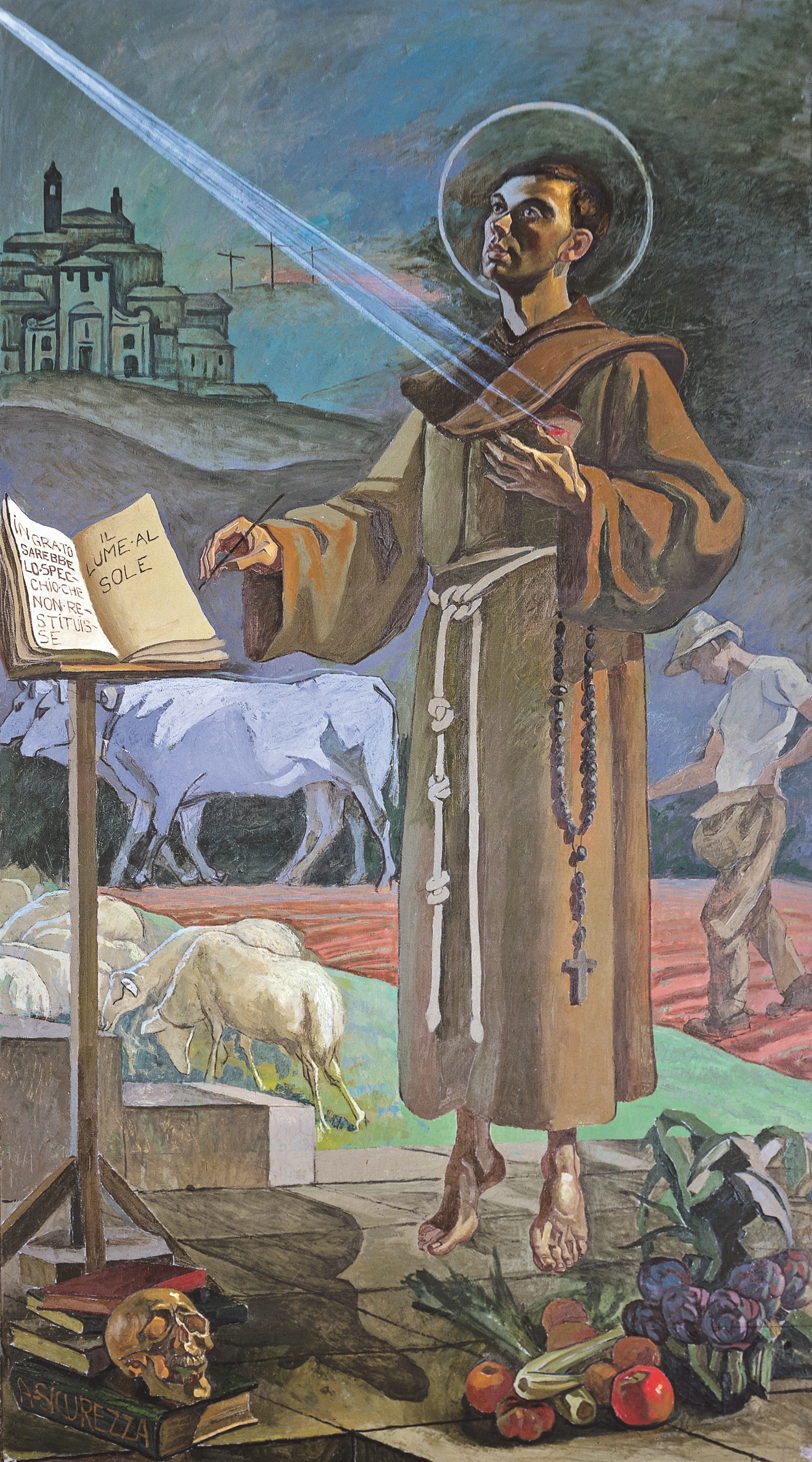

Religious, Confessor
- Born: 19 October 1613; Sezze, Papal States
- Died: 6 January 1670 (aged 56); Rome, Papal States
- Venerated in: Roman Catholic Church
- Beatified: 22 January 1882, Saint Peter's Basilica, Kingdom of Italy by Pope Leo XIII
- Canonized: 12 April 1959, Saint Peter's Square, Vatican City by Pope John XXIII
- Major shrine: San Francesco a Ripa, Rome, Italy
- Feast: 6 January
- Attributes: Franciscan habit
- Patronage: Sezze; Diocese of Latina-Terracina-Sezze-Priverno

Charles of Sezze (19 October 1613 – 6 January 1670) - born Giancarlo Marchioni - was an Italian professed religious from the Order of Friars Minor. He became a religious despite the opposition of his parents who wanted him to become a priest and he led an austere life doing menial tasks such as acting as a porter and gardener; he was also a noted writer. He was also held in high esteem across the Lazio region with noble families like the Colonna and Orsini praising him and seeking his counsel as did popes such as Innocent X and Clement IX.

His beatification was celebrated in 1882 while Pope Pius XII approved his canonization in 1958; but the pope died before he could canonize the friar so his successor Pope John XXIII did so on 12 April 1959.

== Life ==
Giancarlo Marchioni (also known as Charles) was born in Sezze on 19 October 1613 to the poor farmers Ruggero Marchioni and Antonia Maccione. His baptism was celebrated on 22 October 1613. His mother - when he was a toddler - liked to dress him in a dark tunic with a cord and hood in honor of friars Francis of Assisi and Anthony of Padua and she kept this 'habit' even after he outgrew it.

His maternal grandmother Valenza Pilorci instilled devout practices and other religious values within him in his childhood. He worked on the farm as a shepherd to help his parents with the exhaustive workload and liked to plough in the fields because he liked the oxen. He made a private vow to remain chaste in 1630 and in 1633 fell ill to the point of near death that he pledged to join the Order of Friars Minor if he were to be healed of his ailment. His parents encouraged his call to become a priest, though he was a poor student and largely illiterate, leaving seldom hope of his excelling in advanced studies.

He felt a desire to serve in the missions in India and later became inspired from the lives of Pascal Baylon and Salvador of Horta - who were both professed religious. Marchioni was admitted into the order at the San Francesco convent in 1635 at Nazzano; he received the habit of the order on 18 May 1635. He later recounted that he did so out of a desire to live a poor life and to beg alms "for the love of Christ". He again set his heart on the missions but poor health halted this dream.

He lived the life of a religious and never requested ordination to the priesthood despite the protests of his parents to do so. He made his solemn profession into the order on 19 May 1636 into the hands of Father Angelo Maria and his religious name was "Cosmas" at first but his mother's insistence saw it changed to "Carlo". He worked at a range of jobs in various friaries: he cooked and served as a porter and also worked as both a sacristan and gardener; he also went out into the streets as a beggar. He was not qualified in all of them as he became notorious for setting the kitchen of one house on fire. From 1640 to 1642 he was stationed at the convent of Saint John the Baptist at Piglio and at San Francesco at Castel Gandolfo. In October 1648 he attended Mass at the church of San Giuseppe a Capo le Case and a beam of light emanated from an elevated Host that pierced his side and left a visible open wound at his side.

On one occasion the guardian of a convent ordered him - who was the porter at the time - to give food to traveling friars who came to the door. He did this in obedience and alms to the friars decreased. He persuaded the guardian that the two facts were related. Once the friars resumed giving help to all who sought assistance at their door alms to the friars increased. Though he was not a priest he was instructed to write the account of his life after his confessor requested it of him. The result was "The Grandeurs of the Mercies of God" which was well-read; he went on to write several other books. Though he kept himself under the guidance of a spiritual director he himself - though not a priest - was often sought for spiritual advice and even Pope Innocent X and Alexander VII sought him out for advice. In 1656 he tended to victims of cholera at Carpineto. On 22 August 1664 he was at San Pietro in Montorio when he fell ill with malarial fever and so was taken to San Francesco a Ripa to recuperate; he recovered on 30 August after bed rest was prescribed to him. On 28 July 1665 he had a vision of Pope Victor I and Teresa of Ávila.

Pope Clement IX summoned him to his deathbed for comfort and a blessing not long before the two men died. In the first week of December 1669 the pope summoned him but the friar was ill so was taken to the pope on a chair. He greeted the pope: "Holy Father, how are you?" and the pope responded: "As well as God wants me to be". Present in the room was Cardinal Giacomo Rospigliosi and the friar asked him to bless the pope with a special relic he carried but the pope wanted the frail friar to bless him and so he did. Clement IX asked when the two would meet again and the friar told him it would be on the feast of the Epiphany to which those present thought the pope would get well and the two would meet in a month. But the pope died on 9 December and people questioned how the friar was wrong though after the friar died on the Epiphany itself it was realized the pope would greet him as a friend in Heaven thus the two met again.

On 31 December 1669, he was forced to his bed due to pleurisy. On 6 January 1670, he died in the convent attached to San Francesco a Ripa in Rome; he was buried in that church, where a chapel dedicates to his name still hosts his remnants. The friar had predicted that Innocent X and Alexander VII would be elected as popes and likewise predicted Clement IX would be elected as well. But he also managed to predict that Cardinal Emilio Altieri would be elected as pope - which happened not long after his death.

The families of Rome held him in high esteem and even sought him out for advice. Families such as Ludovisi, Boncompagni, Borghese, Caetani, Cibo, Colonna, Orsini and Salviati regarded him well and sought him out wherever possible while cardinals such as Gianstefano Donghi, Francesco Barberini, Celio Piccolomini, Michelangelo Ricci, Cesare Facchinetti, Carlo Barberini and Benedetto Odescalchi - the future Pope Innocent XI - also did likewise.

== Sainthood ==
Pope Clement XIV granted Charles the title of Venerable on 14 June 1772. After the ratification of two miracles attributed to his intercession on 1 October 1881, Pope Leo XIII beatified him on 22 January 1882 in Saint Peter's Basilica. The cause for his sainthood was opened on 4 August 1946. Pope Pius XII confirmed two additional miracles on 7 January 1958 but died before he could canonize the friar; Pope John XXIII canonized him on 12 April 1959 as a saint.

== Published works ==
- Birth of Holy Mary's Novena
- Christmas Novena
- Holy Settenario
- Invalid Path of the Soul
- Jesus Christ's Talk about Life
- The Grandeurs of the Mercies of God
- The Three Ways

== Legacy ==
Croatian Capuchin, Venerable Ante Antić (1893–1965) was his devotee, keeping Charles' picture above his bed.

== Sources ==
- Donald Attwater; Catherine Rachel John (1995). The Penguin Dictionary of Saints, 3rd Edition. New York: Penguin Books. ISBN 0-14-051312-4.
- Raphael Brown (1960). The Wounded Heart: St. Charles of Sezze. Chicago: Franciscan Herald Press. OCLC 3247159.
- St. Charles of Sezze (1963). St. Charles of Sezze: an autobiography. Translated by Leonard Perotti. London: Burns & Oates. OCLC 221056796.
