= Petar Bilušić =

Croatian poet

Petar Bilušić (pronounced [pětar bǐluʃitɕ]; Zaton (Šibenik), 25 June 1904 – Šibenik, 24 October 1994) was a Croatian poet and storyteller.

== Life ==
Petar Bilušić was born in 1904 in Zaton (Šibenik) to father Dunko Bilušić Milošević and mother Jela née Bilušić. He finished 6 grades of elementary school in Zaton (1911 – 1917) and then worked as a laborer. He joined the workers' movement and was imprisoned for political activities in Lepoglava, Sremska Mitrovica, Niš and Šibenik. During 1941 he joined the war on the side of the partisans, but due to illness he was sent back to act from the background. He spent about 18 months in Italian camps (1942 – 1943). After trying to escape multiple times, he was taken to a concentration camp in Trieste and to a hospital in Piacenza. Upon his return to the homeland, he rejoined the war; he was the leader of a group of mobilized fishermen on the island of Žirje. After the liberation of the city, he worked in Šibenik. Petar Bilušić died in 1994 in Šibenik.

== Literary work ==
His first publicized work was the poem Ogledalo in the illegal newspaper Krug (Sremska Mitrovica Prison, 1934). He wrote poems, fairy tales and children's stories with lyrical and humorous, sometimes sentimental and didactic features, publishing them in the following publications: Ilustrirani vjesnik (1952), Omladinski borac (1952), Zapisi s njiva (anthology, 1952), Jutro (1954), Koraci (1954), Novine mladih (1954, 1955), Osvit (1954), Slobodni dan (1954), Šibenska revija (1954), Narodni kalendar Sloga (1955), Polimlje (1955), Radost (1955), Mladi zadrugar (1958), Vesela sveska (1958), Književne novine (1967), and in some daily and weekly newspapers. Bilušić also wrote several plays, most of them being for children and for puppet theatre. Apart from in Šibenik, his play Kuća na rubu šume was also staged in theaters in Bosnia and Herzegovina and in Kosovo, while his play Crvene šoljice was popular in the Croatian National Theatre in Šibenik. Some of his children's poems have been translated into Italian. In 1966 Bilušić published the novel Ljudi iz slijepe ulice (People From the Dead End).

== Works ==
- Djedo mornar i unuk kapetan (Zagreb, 1951)
- Grad na moru (Šibenik, 1954)
- Plave bajke (Šibenik, 1955)
- Put u Afriku (Šibenik, 1956)
- Bjegunci (Šibenik, 1959)
- Gavanovi dvori (Šibenik, 1959)
- Gospodin magarac (Šibenik, 1960)
- Kuća na rubu šume (Šibenik, 1960)
- Pakleni tjesnac (Šibenik, 1960)
- Ljudi iz slijepe ulice (Šibenik, 1966)
