= Prvić =

Island of Croatia

- Location within Croatia
- Interactive map of Prvić

Geography
- Location: Adriatic Sea
- Coordinates: 43°43′48″N 15°47′42″E
- Archipelago: Šibenik archipelago
- Area: 2.37 km^{2} (0.92 sq mi)
- Length: 3.1 km (1.93 mi)
- Width: 1.35 km (0.839 mi)
- Coastline: 10.63 km (6.605 mi)
- Highest elevation: 79 m (259 ft)
- Highest point: Vitković

Administration
- Croatia
- County: Šibenik-Knin County

Demographics
- Population: 403 (2011)
- Pop. density: 147.61/km^{2} (382.31/sq mi)
- Ethnic groups: Croats

Prvić (pronounced [pr̩̂v̞itɕ]) is a small island in the Croatian part of the Adriatic Sea. It is situated in the Šibenik archipelago, about half a mile from the mainland, in the vicinity of Vodice. The whole island is under protection of the Croatian Ministry of Culture since the island is considered a cultural heritage.

The island's total area is 2.37 km^{2} and in 2011 had a population of 403, being the third most densely populated island in Croatia. The coastline of the island is 10.6 km (6.6 miles) long.

== History ==
The name of the island was possibly derived from ancient Greek Proteras, from which could have been Prvin, the name of the pre-Christian Croatian god of spring. The other theory says that the name derives from the fact that Prvić is first ("prvi") island from the mainland in the Šibenik archipelago.

In 14th and 15th century the island belonged to noble families from Šibenik. During Ottoman conquests in 16th and 17th century, the island was inhabited by refugees from the mainland.

During World War II many of the inhabitants of the island joined the Yugoslav Partisans in defending the region against Italian forces. There are several Partisan monuments on the island.

== Economy ==
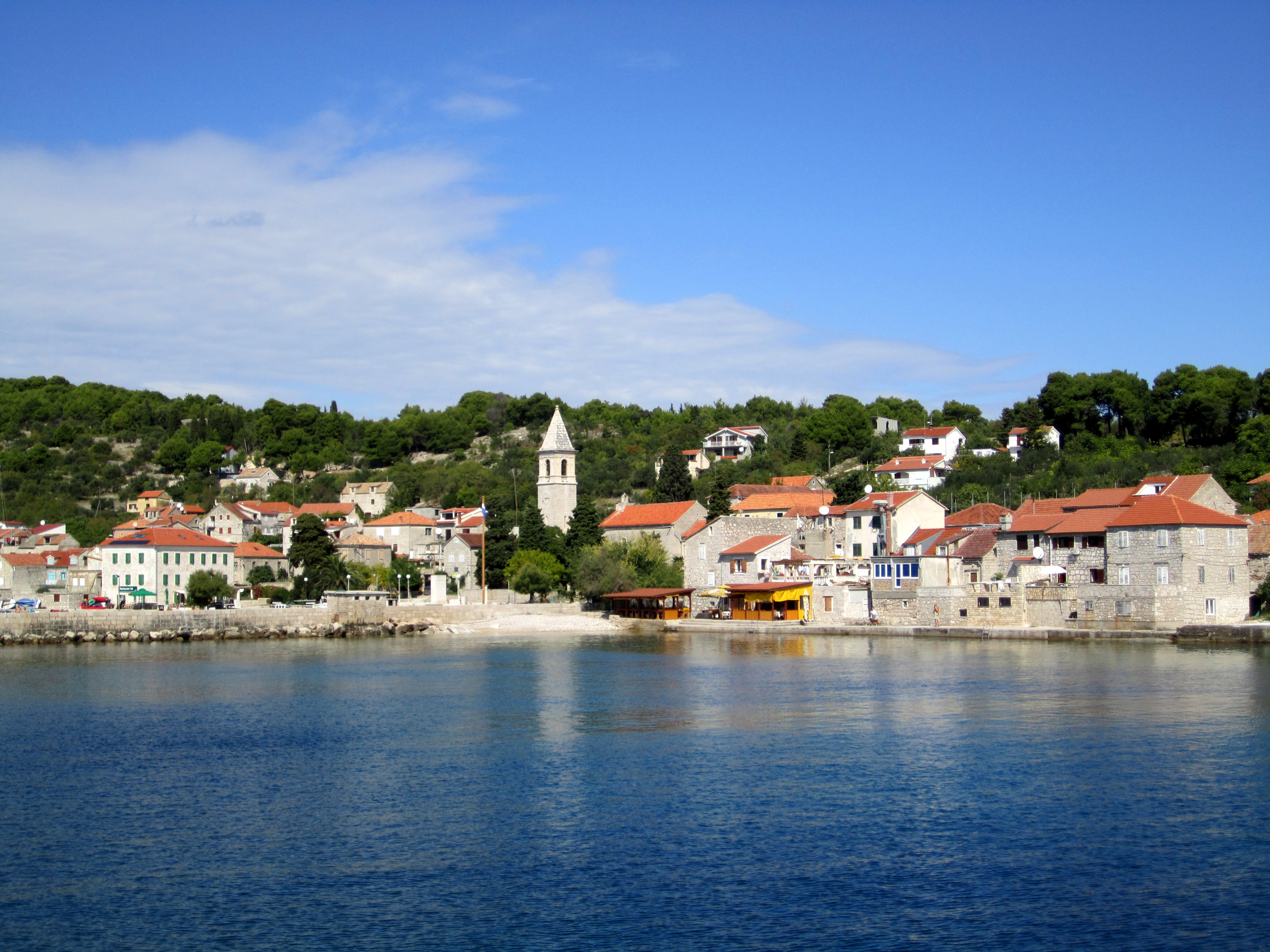
Prvić Luka

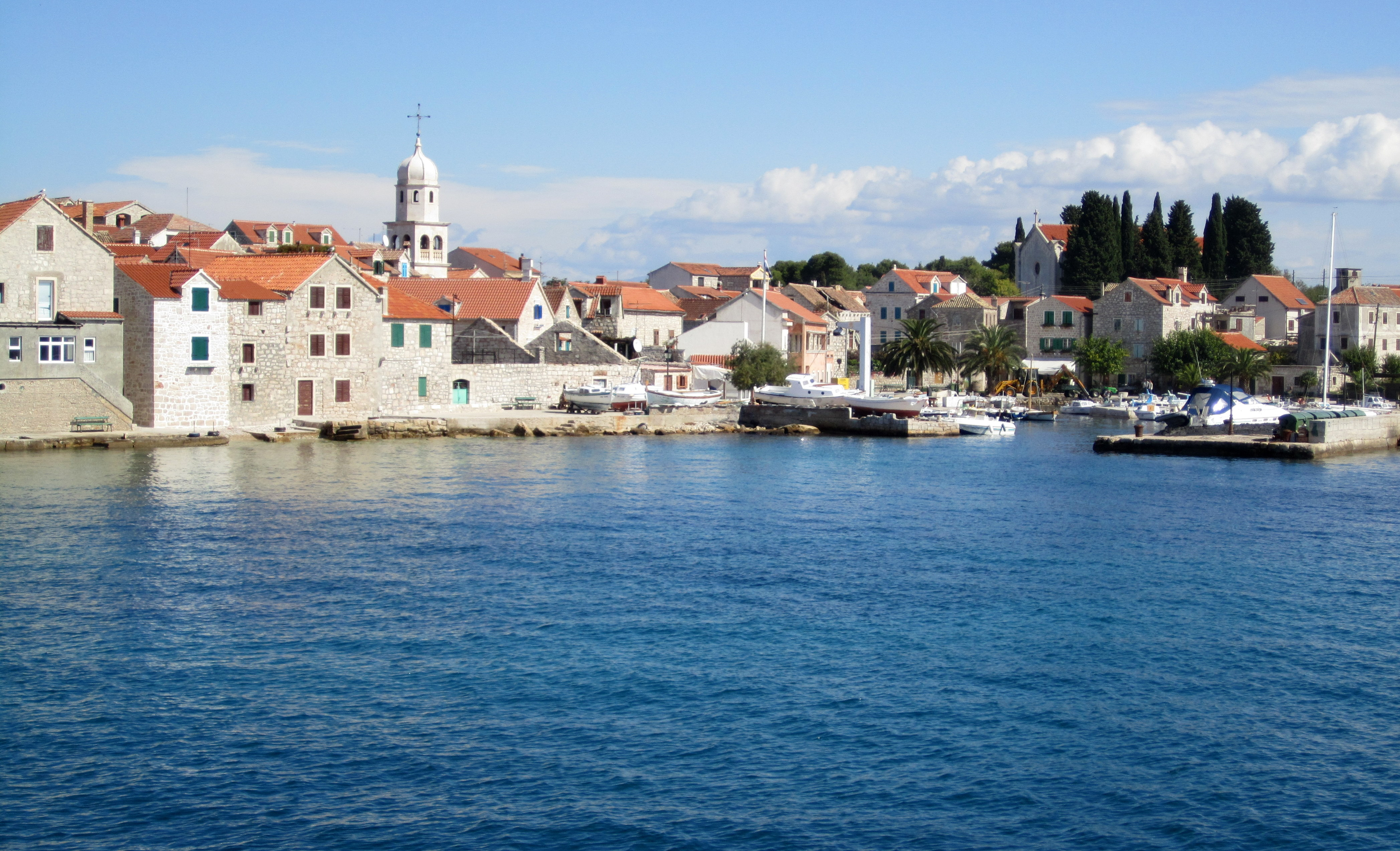
Šepurine

Prvić's main industries are agriculture (grapes, olives and figs), fishing and tourism. From the olives and grape, olive oil and wine are produced.

Tourism is the most important economic branch on the island. There is just one hotel on the island, Hotel Maestral in Prvić Luka, but locals rent their apartments, houses and villas for tourists. Islands is in the near of the both Krka and Kornati National Park, accessible by ferries. Prvić is also one of the hosts of the Adriatic boat show-

== Culture ==
There are four Roman Catholic churches on the island, both two in Šepurine and in Prvić Luka. The smaller church in Šepurine was built in medieval times, and the bigger one in the 19th century. There are many cultural events on the island during the year, such as; music concerts, art exhibitions, many sport competitions and others.

Every year on August 2 there is a local celebration in Prvić Luka, and on August 16 (Saint Roch) the fešta is in Šepurine.

The cuisine is Mediterranean, especially Dalmatian.

== Villages ==
There are two villages on the island: Prvić Luka and Prvić Šepurine.

Šepurine is located on the west side of the island opposite Vodice. Prvić Luka is situated in the biggest bay on the southeast side and it is well protected from the northern and western winds.

== Interesting facts ==
- Famous Croatian bishop, inventor and polymath Faust Vrančić is buried in a church in Prvić Luka.
- In Šepurine the Faust Vrančić family had a large baroque-style summer residence which is now in the possession of the Draganić family.
- Servant of God Ante Antić (hr) was born in Šepurine.
- There are no cars on the whole island, except a fire truck. There are a few tractors and bicycles.
- Many ancient and medieval artifacts were found on the island.
