= Prvić Šepurine =

Settlement in Šibenik-Knin County, Croatia

- Settlement
- Interactive map of Prvić Šepurine
- Location of Prvić Šepurine in Croatia
- Coordinates: 43°43′59″N 15°48′00″E
- Country: Croatia
- County: Šibenik-Knin
- City: Vodice

Area
  - Total: 4.0 km^{2} (1.5 sq mi)

Population (2021)
  - Total: 252
  - Density: 63/km^{2} (160/sq mi)
- Time zone: UTC+1 (CET)
  - Summer (DST): UTC+2 (CEST)
- Postal code: 22234 Prvić Šepurine
- Area code: +385 (0)22

Prvić Šepurine is a settlement on the western side of the Prvić island, part of the City of Vodice in Adriatic Croatia. In 2021, its population was 252.

There are two Catholic churches in the village. Šepurine is known as a bithplace of Venerable Ante Antić.

== Demographics ==
Prvić Šepurine: Population trends 1857–2021
v

population	971		1301	1364	1576	1699	1750	1413	1242	1176	955	623	397	315	262	239	252
	1857	1869	1880	1890	1900	1910	1921	1931	1948	1953	1961	1971	1981	1991	2001	2011	2021

Sources: Croatian Bureau of Statistics publications
