= Nikola Tesla Technical Museum =

Technology museum in Zagreb, Croatia

- Tehnički muzej Nikola Tesla

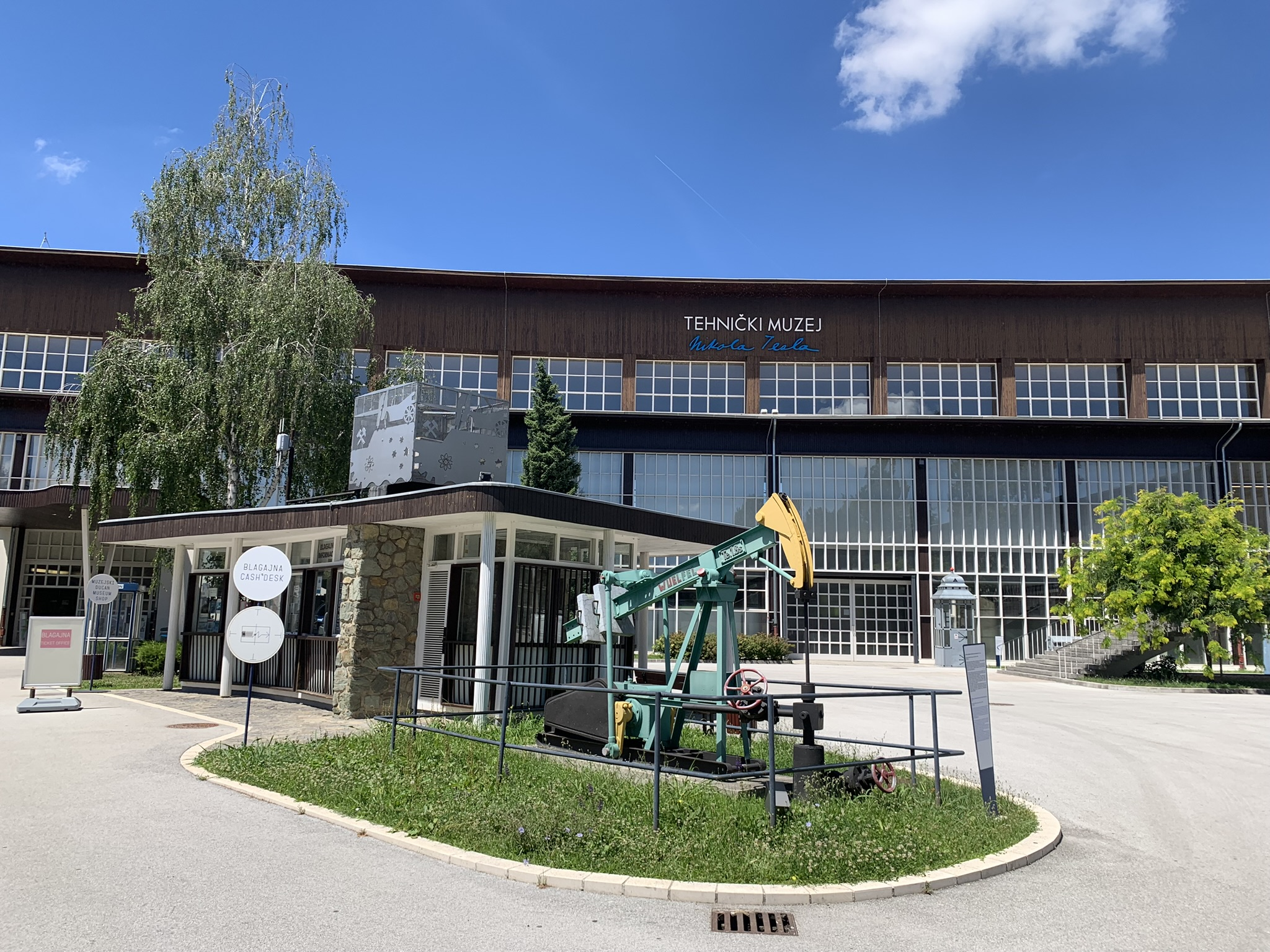
- The main building of the Technical Museum
- Established: 1954; 72 years ago
- Location: 18 Savska Street, Zagreb, Croatia
- Coordinates: 45°48′15″N 15°57′51″E
- Type: Technology museum
- Collection size: 3,000
- Visitors: 377,132 (2024)
- Founder: City of Zagreb
- Architect: Marijan Haberl
- Website: www.tmnt.hr

The Nikola Tesla Technical Museum (Croatian: Tehnički muzej Nikola Tesla) is a technology museum located in Zagreb, Croatia, which collects and showcases scientific and technical appliances used in the country's history. It exhibits numerous historic aircraft, cars, machinery and equipment.

== History ==
The Technical Museum was founded in 1954, officially opening to the public on 14 January 1963 on the Savska street. The creator of the concept of this museum was Božo Težak, then a professor of at the Faculty of Science, University of Zagreb, who visionarily conceived the Museum as a combination of a scientific center and a classic complex museum of technology. Professor Težak's vision is reflected in his concept of the Technical Museum, which, in addition to the basic content of a classic museum with a display of original exhibits from the field of technology and engineering, acts as an educational center for teaching a better understanding of natural sciences and technology.

From the very beginning, the concept of the Technical Museum was focused on the public and education, as well as lifelong learning and informal education, which coincided with the new paradigm of post-war European and American museums. The history of the location at Savska cesta 18 is interesting and connected to the area of operation of the Museum. Namely, the first tram depot of today's Zagreb Electric Tram (ZET) was located exactly on the Museum's location from the end of 1891 until the construction of a new depot on Trešnjevka in 1936, as evidenced by the discovery of a tram track excavated during works in the Museum's courtyard.

In June 2015, the City Assembly of the City of Zagreb decided to rename the Technical Museum after Nikola Tesla.

=== Visits ===
In 2012, the museum had 125,000 visitors. In 2013, it had over 118,000 visitors, and was the most visited museum in Croatia. With 141,000 visitors in 2018, it was the 7th most visited museum in Croatia. In 2023, the museum recorded almost 260,000 visitors, of which 31,500 were from abroad. And in 2024, it had 377,132 visitors which made it 3rd most visited museum in Croatia.

== Features ==
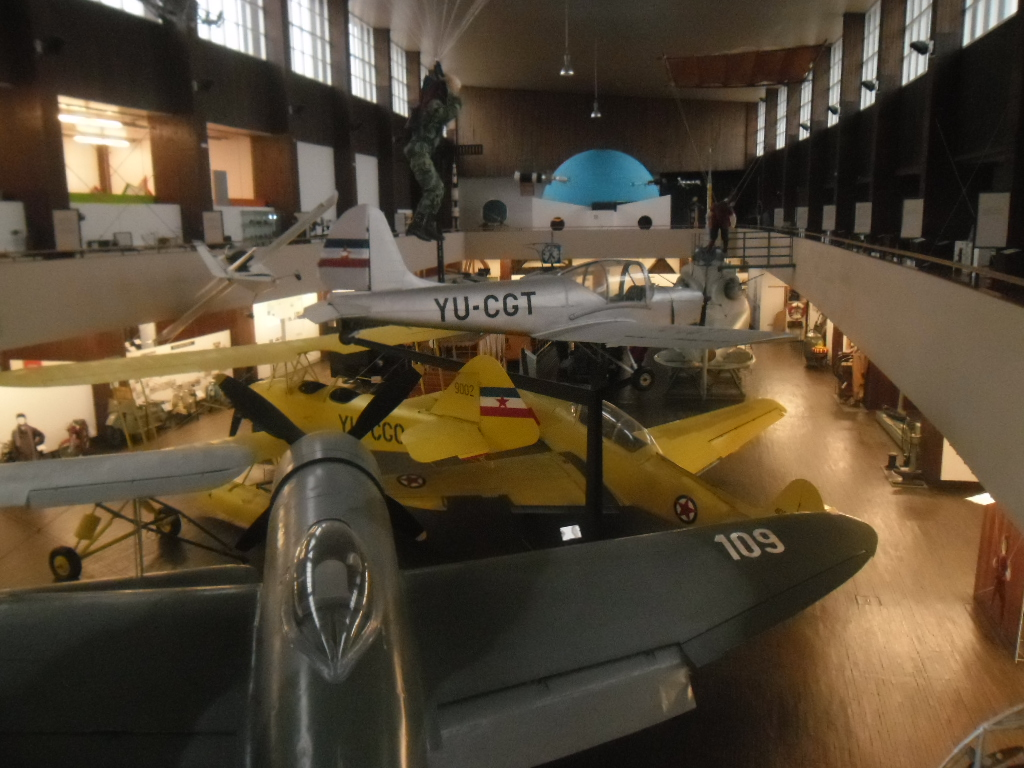
A part of the museum which exhibits fighter planes manufactured and used in Croatia's socialist era

The museum maintains the oldest preserved steam engine in the area, dating from the mid-19th century, which is still operational.

There are various distinct sections in the museum:

- the Planetarium, used to be run by Ante Radonić
- the Beehive exhibit
- the Mine, model of mines for coal, iron and non-ferrous metals, about 300 m (980 ft) long
- the Nikola Tesla study.

The Museum organises educational, study, informative and occasional exhibitions, lectures and panel discussions on popular science, as well as playrooms and workshops.

== Exhibits ==
In the permanent exhibition, 14 thematic units are presented with a number of sub-themes: Energy transformation, Means of transport, Mining-geology-oil with a mine model, Museums Land surveying-cadastre office, Demonstration cabinet Nikola Tesla and Firefighting on the ground floor and Astronautics with Planetarium, Agriculture, Apisarium (demonstration bee hives) and the Department and info center Renewable sources and energy efficiency on the floor of the large exhibition hall A. On the third floor there is and the exhibition Open Doors, where materials from a number of collections are presented that are not represented in the permanent exhibition and are presented with a "look" into the collection. The permanent exhibit dedicated to renewable sources and energy efficiency (2013), as well as the renewed exhibit on nuclear energy (2014) and the Info corner on radioactive waste (2016) are dedicated to current topics and issues of both science and technology as well as society as a whole.

In addition to more than 3,000 objects exhibited in the permanent exhibition, the Museum's storage rooms store thousands of objects that are not presented to the public. A smaller number of these objects relate to the collections represented in the permanent exhibition, while a significantly larger number of objects belong to collections, i.e. areas of technology such as: Computer technology, Gramophones and tape recorders, Radio and television technology, Telegraphs and telephones, Household technology, Textile technology, Medical technology, X-ray technology, Instruments and teaching aids, Still image projectors, Photographic technology, Cinematographic technology, Crafts, Sound carriers, Writing and text reproduction technology, Electricity, Metallurgy, Steam engines, Lighting, Office equipment and supplies, and others.

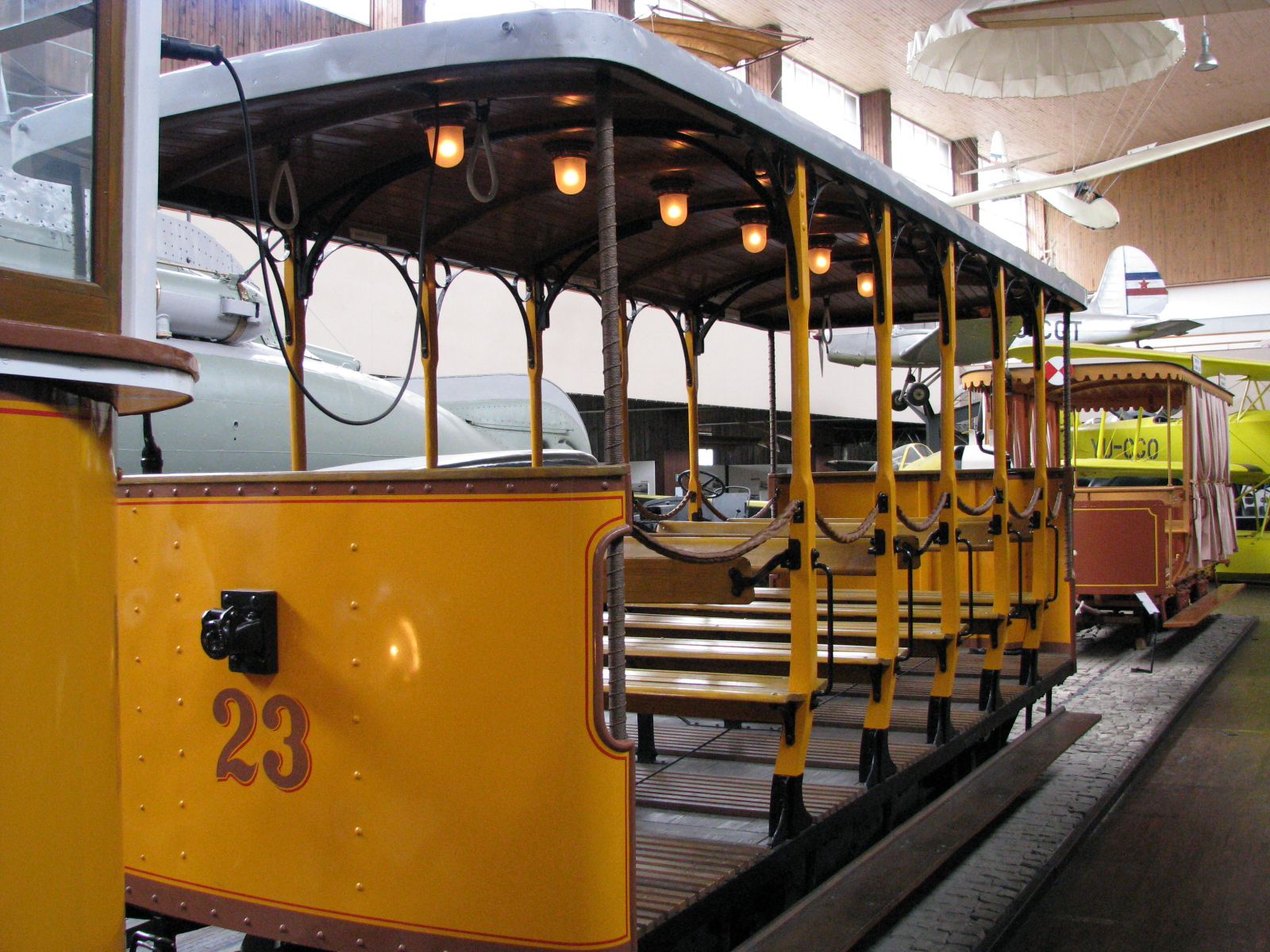
A historic tram model used in Dubrovnik

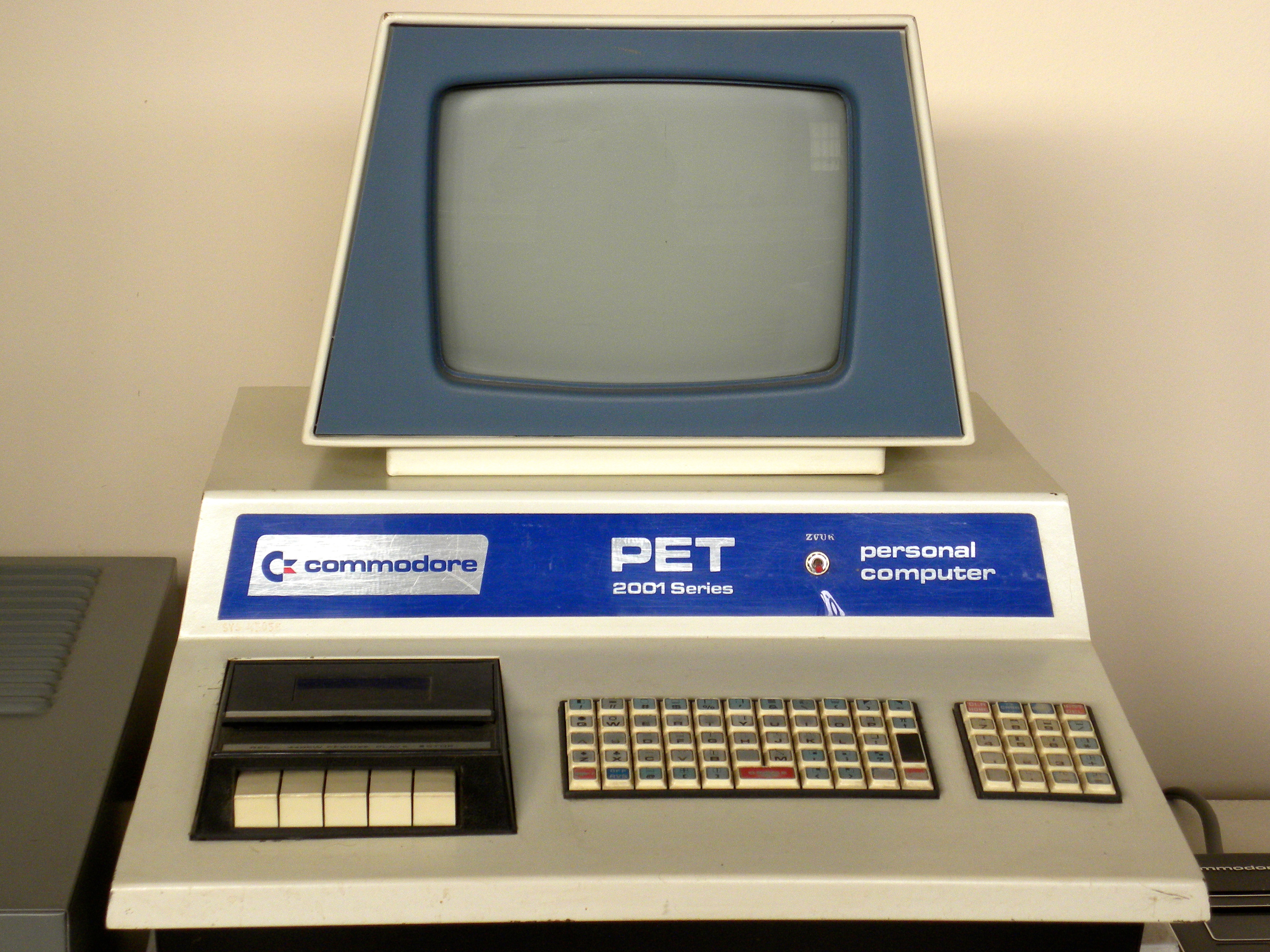
A Commodore PET 2001, an early personal computer developed in 1977

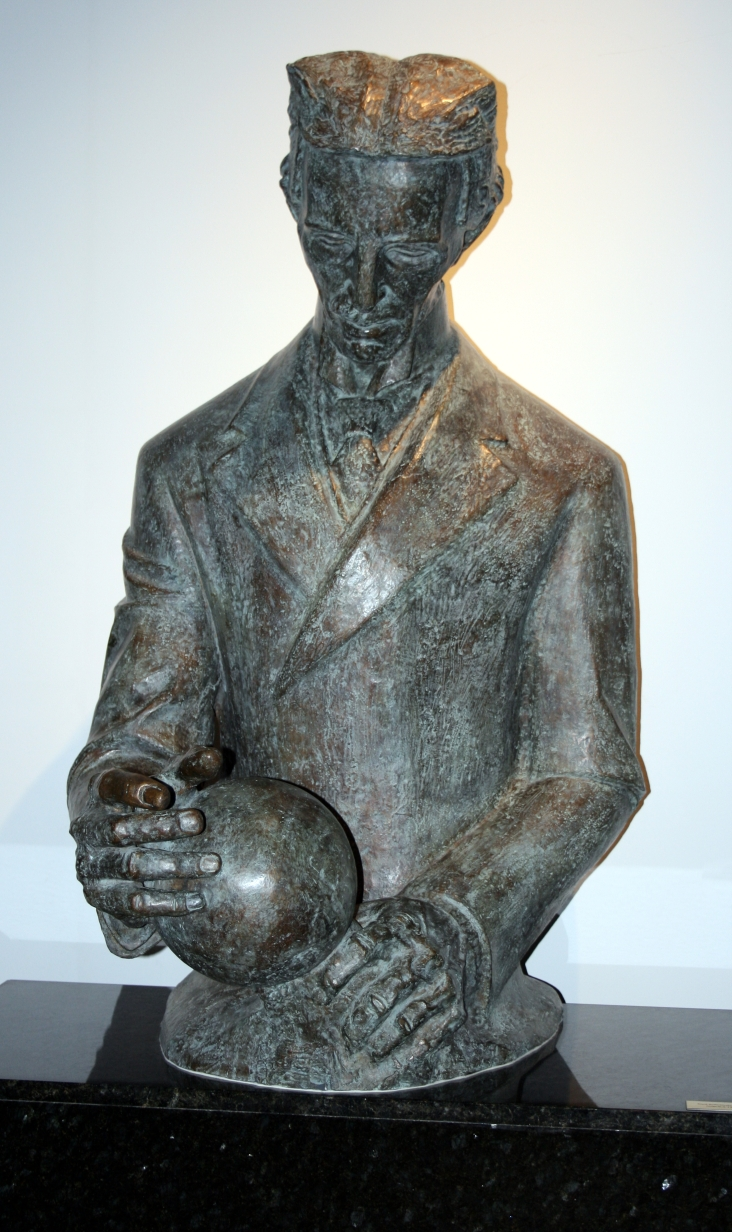
A statue of Nikola Tesla

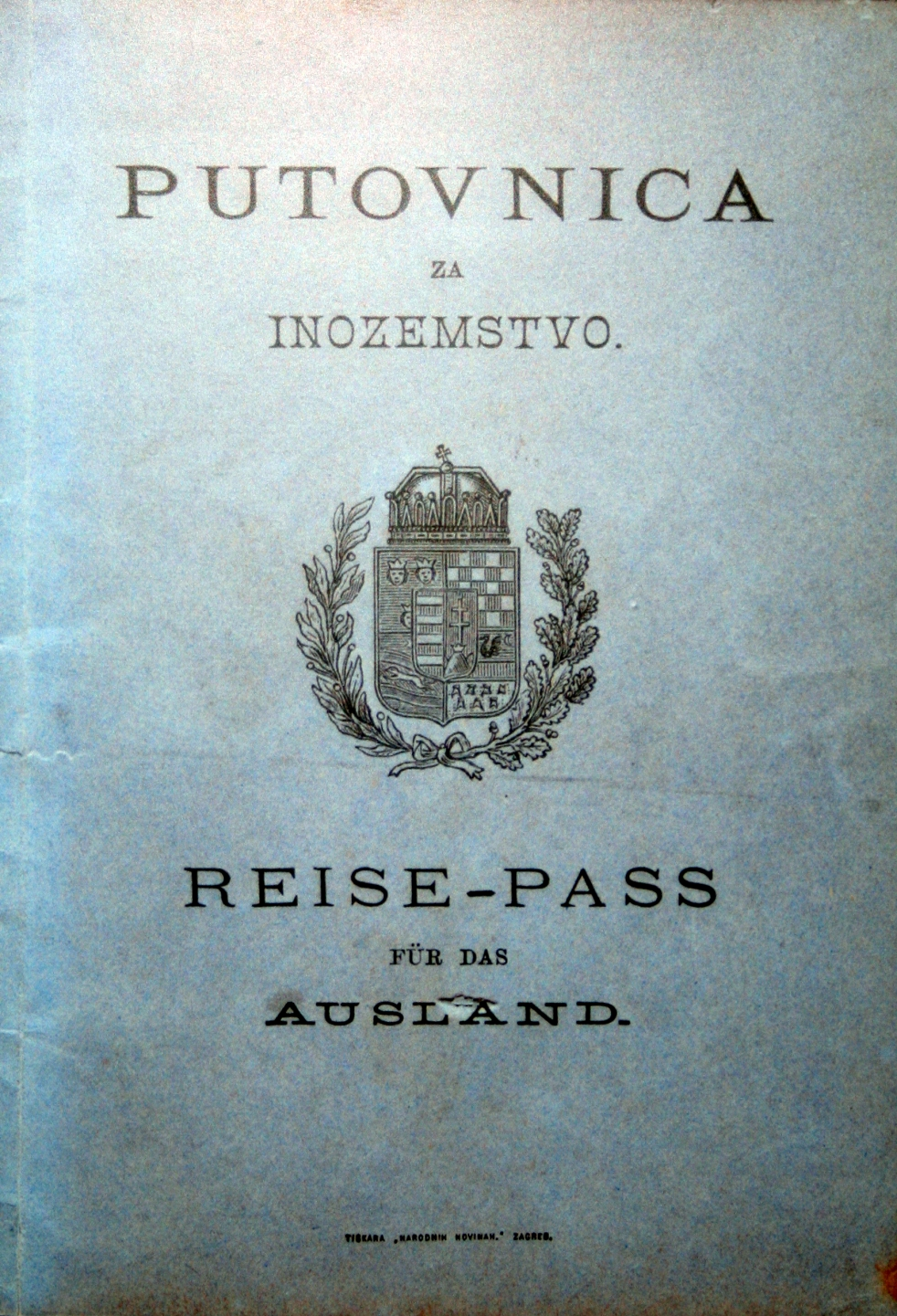
The passport of Nikola Tesla

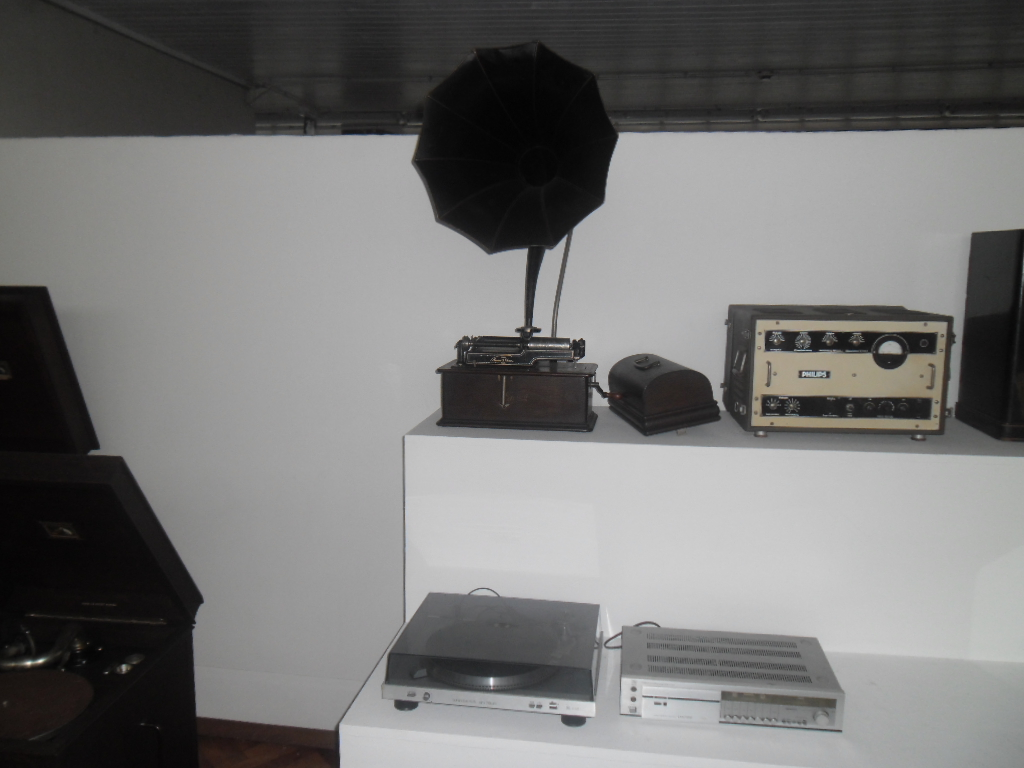
A gramophone, vinyl player, and radio, all on display.

== See also ==
- List of museums in Croatia
