= Meanings of minor-planet names: 176001–177000 =

As minor planet discoveries are confirmed, they are given a permanent number by the IAU's Minor Planet Center (MPC), and the discoverers can then submit names for them, following the IAU's naming conventions. The list below concerns those minor planets in the specified number-range that have received names, and explains the meanings of those names.

Official naming citations of newly named small Solar System bodies are approved and published in a bulletin by IAU's Working Group for Small Bodies Nomenclature (WGSBN). Before May 2021, citations were published in MPC's Minor Planet Circulars for many decades. Recent citations can also be found on the JPL Small-Body Database (SBDB). Until his death in 2016, German astronomer Lutz D. Schmadel compiled these citations into the Dictionary of Minor Planet Names (DMP) and regularly updated the collection.

Based on Paul Herget's The Names of the Minor Planets, Schmadel also researched the unclear origin of numerous asteroids, most of which had been named prior to World War II. This article incorporates text from this source, which is in the public domain: SBDB New namings may only be added to this list below after official publication as the preannouncement of names is condemned. The WGSBN publishes a comprehensive guideline for the naming rules of non-cometary small Solar System bodies.

== 176001–176100 ==
Named minor planet	Provisional	This minor planet was named for...	Ref · Catalog
176014 Vedrana	2000 RS_{106}	Vedrana Ivezić (born 2000), is an American amateur astronomer and the daughter of Croatian-American astrophysicist Željko Ivezić	JPL · 176014

== 176101–176200 ==
back to top

Named minor planet	Provisional	This minor planet was named for...	Ref · Catalog
176103 Waynejohnson	2001 BE_{61}	Wayne Johnson (born 1953), is an American amateur astronomer, president of the Huachuca Astronomy Club and chair of the western region of the Astronomical League. He discovered several supernovae, and was the first amateur to find two such astronomical objects on the same night.	JPL · 176103

== 176201–176300 ==
back to top

Named minor planet	Provisional	This minor planet was named for...	Ref · Catalog
There are no named minor planets in this number range

== 176301–176400 ==
back to top

Named minor planet	Provisional	This minor planet was named for...	Ref · Catalog
176380 Goran	2001 TE_{248}	Goran Ivezić (born 1971), is a Croatian amateur astronomer and the brother of SDSS team member Željko Ivezić.	JPL · 176380

== 176401–176500 ==
back to top

Named minor planet	Provisional	This minor planet was named for...	Ref · Catalog
There are no named minor planets in this number range

== 176501–176600 ==
back to top

Named minor planet	Provisional	This minor planet was named for...	Ref · Catalog
176532 Boskri	2002 AF_{2}	Abdelkarim Boskri (b. 1990), a Moroccan astrophysicist.	IAU · 176532

== 176601–176700 ==
back to top

Named minor planet	Provisional	This minor planet was named for...	Ref · Catalog
176610 Nuñez	2002 FW_{18}	Jorge I. Nunez (born 1981) is a scientist at the Johns Hopkins University Applied Physics Laboratory. He served as a LORRI Instrument Data Scientist for the New Horizons mission to Pluto.	JPL · 176610

== 176701–176800 ==
back to top

Named minor planet	Provisional	This minor planet was named for...	Ref · Catalog
176710 Banff	2002 QR_{56}	The Canadian town of Banff located within the Banff National Park, is known for its hot springs and mountainous scenery, and one of the country's most popular tourist attractions.	JPL · 176710
176711 Canmore	2002 QM_{57}	The town of Canmore, the most important coal-mining centers in southern Alberta	JPL · 176711

== 176801–176900 ==
back to top

Named minor planet	Provisional	This minor planet was named for...	Ref · Catalog
176866 Kuropatkin	2002 TO_{316}	Nickolai Kuropatkin (born 1949), Russian-American physicist with the Sloan Digital Sky Survey	JPL · 176866
176867 Brianlee	2002 TA_{321}	Brian C. Lee (born 1968), American physicist with the Sloan Digital Sky Survey	JPL · 176867
176884 Jallynsmith	2002 UZ_{58}	J. Allyn Smith (born 1954), American astronomer with the Sloan Digital Sky Survey	JPL · 176884

== 176901–177000 ==
back to top

Named minor planet	Provisional	This minor planet was named for...	Ref · Catalog
176981 Anteradonić	2002 XJ_{116}	Ante Radonić (born 1951) is a Croatian astronomer, who writes for the weekly radio show Andromeda and is a major contributor to the popularization of astronomy and astronautics in Croatia.	IAU · 176981

back to top

Preceded by 175,001–176,000	Meanings of minor-planet names List of minor planets: 176,001–177,000	Succeeded by 177,001–178,000
