= List of minor planets: 176001–177000 =

The following is a partial list of minor planets, running from minor-planet number 176001 through 177000, inclusive. The primary data for this and other partial lists is based on JPL's "Small-Body Orbital Elements" and data available from the Minor Planet Center. Critical list information is also provided by the MPC, unless otherwise specified from Lowell Observatory. A detailed description of the table's columns and additional sources are given on the main page including a complete list of every page in this series, and a statistical break-up on the dynamical classification of minor planets.

Also see the summary list of all named bodies in numerical and alphabetical order, and the corresponding naming citations for the number range of this particular list. New namings may only be added to this list after official publication, as the preannouncement of names is condemned by the Working Group for Small Bodies Nomenclature of the International Astronomical Union.

Near-Earth obj.	MBA (inner)	MBA (outer)	Centaur
Mars-crosser	MBA (middle)	Jupiter trojan	Trans-Neptunian obj.
Unclassified

== 176001–176100 ==
Designation			Discovery			Properties		Ref
Permanent	Provisional	Named after	Date	Site	Discoverer(s)	Category	Diam.	Ref
176001	2000 QR_{230}	—	August 31, 2000	Socorro	LINEAR	EOS ·	7.1 km	MPC · JPL
176002	2000 QU_{243}	—	August 21, 2000	Anderson Mesa	LONEOS	·	2.7 km	MPC · JPL
176003	2000 RH_{13}	—	September 1, 2000	Socorro	LINEAR	·	8.1 km	MPC · JPL
176004	2000 RZ_{15}	—	September 1, 2000	Socorro	LINEAR	THB	5.2 km	MPC · JPL
176005	2000 RW_{34}	—	September 1, 2000	Socorro	LINEAR	·	5.2 km	MPC · JPL
176006	2000 RQ_{58}	—	September 7, 2000	Kitt Peak	Spacewatch	·	1 km	MPC · JPL
176007	2000 RV_{64}	—	September 1, 2000	Socorro	LINEAR	·	4.7 km	MPC · JPL
176008	2000 RS_{79}	—	September 1, 2000	Socorro	LINEAR	·	6.9 km	MPC · JPL
176009	2000 RY_{86}	—	September 2, 2000	Anderson Mesa	LONEOS	·	6.0 km	MPC · JPL
176010	2000 RV_{87}	—	September 2, 2000	Anderson Mesa	LONEOS	·	1.2 km	MPC · JPL
176011	2000 RF_{90}	—	September 3, 2000	Socorro	LINEAR	·	6.0 km	MPC · JPL
176012	2000 RM_{102}	—	September 5, 2000	Anderson Mesa	LONEOS	LIX	6.8 km	MPC · JPL
176013	2000 RW_{102}	—	September 5, 2000	Anderson Mesa	LONEOS	·	7.9 km	MPC · JPL
176014 Vedrana	2000 RS_{106}	Vedrana	September 3, 2000	Apache Point	SDSS	·	4.3 km	MPC · JPL
176015	2000 SR	—	September 19, 2000	Kitt Peak	Spacewatch	·	3.6 km	MPC · JPL
176016	2000 SP_{13}	—	September 21, 2000	Socorro	LINEAR	·	1.3 km	MPC · JPL
176017	2000 SD_{19}	—	September 23, 2000	Socorro	LINEAR	·	5.7 km	MPC · JPL
176018	2000 SY_{41}	—	September 24, 2000	Socorro	LINEAR	·	1.1 km	MPC · JPL
176019	2000 SE_{49}	—	September 23, 2000	Socorro	LINEAR	·	3.6 km	MPC · JPL
176020	2000 SQ_{50}	—	September 23, 2000	Socorro	LINEAR	·	4.5 km	MPC · JPL
176021	2000 SW_{50}	—	September 23, 2000	Socorro	LINEAR	·	4.7 km	MPC · JPL
176022	2000 SR_{71}	—	September 24, 2000	Socorro	LINEAR	·	3.6 km	MPC · JPL
176023	2000 SL_{72}	—	September 24, 2000	Socorro	LINEAR	·	2.0 km	MPC · JPL
176024	2000 SZ_{76}	—	September 24, 2000	Socorro	LINEAR	·	4.2 km	MPC · JPL
176025	2000 SB_{79}	—	September 24, 2000	Socorro	LINEAR	·	3.9 km	MPC · JPL
176026	2000 ST_{81}	—	September 24, 2000	Socorro	LINEAR	·	4.3 km	MPC · JPL
176027	2000 SD_{89}	—	September 25, 2000	Socorro	LINEAR	EOS	3.0 km	MPC · JPL
176028	2000 SL_{91}	—	September 23, 2000	Socorro	LINEAR	·	4.8 km	MPC · JPL
176029	2000 SH_{95}	—	September 23, 2000	Socorro	LINEAR	·	3.2 km	MPC · JPL
176030	2000 SB_{124}	—	September 24, 2000	Socorro	LINEAR	·	1.4 km	MPC · JPL
176031	2000 SM_{133}	—	September 23, 2000	Socorro	LINEAR	·	5.3 km	MPC · JPL
176032	2000 SO_{175}	—	September 28, 2000	Socorro	LINEAR	·	4.9 km	MPC · JPL
176033	2000 SH_{177}	—	September 28, 2000	Socorro	LINEAR	·	7.0 km	MPC · JPL
176034	2000 SY_{183}	—	September 20, 2000	Haleakala	NEAT	·	4.6 km	MPC · JPL
176035	2000 SD_{186}	—	September 21, 2000	Kitt Peak	Spacewatch	·	4.4 km	MPC · JPL
176036	2000 SP_{200}	—	September 24, 2000	Socorro	LINEAR	·	2.9 km	MPC · JPL
176037	2000 SR_{200}	—	September 24, 2000	Socorro	LINEAR	HYG	3.9 km	MPC · JPL
176038	2000 SG_{213}	—	September 25, 2000	Socorro	LINEAR	·	5.1 km	MPC · JPL
176039	2000 SP_{217}	—	September 26, 2000	Socorro	LINEAR	·	1.2 km	MPC · JPL
176040	2000 SY_{223}	—	September 27, 2000	Socorro	LINEAR	EOS	2.8 km	MPC · JPL
176041	2000 SM_{254}	—	September 24, 2000	Socorro	LINEAR	·	5.1 km	MPC · JPL
176042	2000 SA_{263}	—	September 25, 2000	Socorro	LINEAR	·	3.2 km	MPC · JPL
176043	2000 SW_{294}	—	September 27, 2000	Socorro	LINEAR	·	1.1 km	MPC · JPL
176044	2000 SA_{309}	—	September 30, 2000	Socorro	LINEAR	·	1.3 km	MPC · JPL
176045	2000 SX_{309}	—	September 25, 2000	Socorro	LINEAR	PHO	3.2 km	MPC · JPL
176046	2000 SC_{310}	—	September 26, 2000	Socorro	LINEAR	·	7.4 km	MPC · JPL
176047	2000 SL_{362}	—	September 18, 2000	Anderson Mesa	LONEOS	LIX	6.7 km	MPC · JPL
176048	2000 TH	—	October 2, 2000	OCA-Anza Obs.	M. Collins, Rudd, A.	EOS ·	3.6 km	MPC · JPL
176049	2000 TM_{10}	—	October 1, 2000	Socorro	LINEAR	EOS	3.5 km	MPC · JPL
176050	2000 TU_{11}	—	October 1, 2000	Socorro	LINEAR	·	2.8 km	MPC · JPL
176051	2000 TX_{17}	—	October 1, 2000	Socorro	LINEAR	·	1.0 km	MPC · JPL
176052	2000 TT_{22}	—	October 1, 2000	Socorro	LINEAR	·	4.5 km	MPC · JPL
176053	2000 TO_{35}	—	October 6, 2000	Anderson Mesa	LONEOS	HYG	3.8 km	MPC · JPL
176054	2000 TE_{37}	—	October 1, 2000	Socorro	LINEAR	ADE	5.4 km	MPC · JPL
176055	2000 TM_{46}	—	October 1, 2000	Anderson Mesa	LONEOS	KOR	2.5 km	MPC · JPL
176056	2000 TC_{52}	—	October 1, 2000	Socorro	LINEAR	·	5.0 km	MPC · JPL
176057	2000 TH_{64}	—	October 5, 2000	Kitt Peak	Spacewatch	EOS	3.1 km	MPC · JPL
176058	2000 UW_{14}	—	October 25, 2000	Socorro	LINEAR	·	4.6 km	MPC · JPL
176059	2000 US_{18}	—	October 25, 2000	Socorro	LINEAR	·	4.7 km	MPC · JPL
176060	2000 UF_{32}	—	October 29, 2000	Kitt Peak	Spacewatch	·	1.2 km	MPC · JPL
176061	2000 UC_{37}	—	October 24, 2000	Socorro	LINEAR	·	2.4 km	MPC · JPL
176062	2000 UQ_{46}	—	October 24, 2000	Socorro	LINEAR	·	1.0 km	MPC · JPL
176063	2000 UA_{62}	—	October 25, 2000	Socorro	LINEAR	·	1.2 km	MPC · JPL
176064	2000 UM_{67}	—	October 25, 2000	Socorro	LINEAR	·	4.3 km	MPC · JPL
176065	2000 VS_{43}	—	November 1, 2000	Socorro	LINEAR	·	1.1 km	MPC · JPL
176066	2000 VF_{44}	—	November 2, 2000	Socorro	LINEAR	URS	5.9 km	MPC · JPL
176067	2000 WJ_{4}	—	November 19, 2000	Socorro	LINEAR	·	5.0 km	MPC · JPL
176068	2000 WZ_{39}	—	November 20, 2000	Socorro	LINEAR	·	1.2 km	MPC · JPL
176069	2000 WG_{68}	—	November 28, 2000	Kitt Peak	Spacewatch	·	1.5 km	MPC · JPL
176070	2000 WR_{70}	—	November 19, 2000	Socorro	LINEAR	·	6.6 km	MPC · JPL
176071	2000 WE_{71}	—	November 19, 2000	Socorro	LINEAR	·	1.1 km	MPC · JPL
176072	2000 WN_{76}	—	November 20, 2000	Socorro	LINEAR	·	1.1 km	MPC · JPL
176073	2000 WL_{108}	—	November 20, 2000	Socorro	LINEAR	·	1.3 km	MPC · JPL
176074	2000 WY_{113}	—	November 20, 2000	Socorro	LINEAR	·	1.3 km	MPC · JPL
176075	2000 WY_{114}	—	November 20, 2000	Socorro	LINEAR	·	1.2 km	MPC · JPL
176076	2000 WG_{184}	—	November 30, 2000	Anderson Mesa	LONEOS	(2076)	1.5 km	MPC · JPL
176077	2000 WW_{191}	—	November 19, 2000	Anderson Mesa	LONEOS	·	6.9 km	MPC · JPL
176078	2000 XM_{5}	—	December 1, 2000	Socorro	LINEAR	·	1.2 km	MPC · JPL
176079	2000 XO_{21}	—	December 4, 2000	Socorro	LINEAR	·	1.2 km	MPC · JPL
176080	2000 XK_{24}	—	December 4, 2000	Socorro	LINEAR	·	1.4 km	MPC · JPL
176081	2000 XW_{27}	—	December 4, 2000	Socorro	LINEAR	·	1.3 km	MPC · JPL
176082	2000 XX_{41}	—	December 5, 2000	Socorro	LINEAR	PHO	2.3 km	MPC · JPL
176083	2000 XP_{45}	—	December 15, 2000	Socorro	LINEAR	·	2.4 km	MPC · JPL
176084	2000 YT_{10}	—	December 22, 2000	Socorro	LINEAR	·	1.1 km	MPC · JPL
176085	2000 YE_{14}	—	December 23, 2000	Kitt Peak	Spacewatch	·	1.7 km	MPC · JPL
176086	2000 YS_{16}	—	December 20, 2000	Socorro	LINEAR	·	1.5 km	MPC · JPL
176087	2000 YS_{47}	—	December 30, 2000	Socorro	LINEAR	·	1.5 km	MPC · JPL
176088	2000 YQ_{57}	—	December 30, 2000	Socorro	LINEAR	·	1.2 km	MPC · JPL
176089	2000 YB_{80}	—	December 30, 2000	Socorro	LINEAR	·	1.4 km	MPC · JPL
176090	2000 YJ_{90}	—	December 30, 2000	Socorro	LINEAR	·	1.1 km	MPC · JPL
176091	2000 YW_{98}	—	December 30, 2000	Socorro	LINEAR	(2076)	1.2 km	MPC · JPL
176092	2000 YK_{108}	—	December 30, 2000	Socorro	LINEAR	·	1.2 km	MPC · JPL
176093	2000 YS_{112}	—	December 30, 2000	Socorro	LINEAR	·	1.4 km	MPC · JPL
176094	2001 AR_{18}	—	January 3, 2001	Socorro	LINEAR	·	1.7 km	MPC · JPL
176095	2001 AK_{34}	—	January 4, 2001	Socorro	LINEAR	·	1.4 km	MPC · JPL
176096	2001 BD_{3}	—	January 18, 2001	Socorro	LINEAR	PHO	2.3 km	MPC · JPL
176097	2001 BX_{9}	—	January 16, 2001	Kitt Peak	Spacewatch	·	750 m	MPC · JPL
176098	2001 BT_{16}	—	January 18, 2001	Socorro	LINEAR	·	3.2 km	MPC · JPL
176099	2001 BV_{17}	—	January 19, 2001	Socorro	LINEAR	·	1.2 km	MPC · JPL
176100	2001 BX_{26}	—	January 20, 2001	Socorro	LINEAR	·	1.5 km	MPC · JPL

== 176101–176200 ==
back to top

Designation			Discovery			Properties		Ref
Permanent	Provisional	Named after	Date	Site	Discoverer(s)	Category	Diam.	Ref
176101	2001 BQ_{37}	—	January 21, 2001	Socorro	LINEAR	·	1.1 km	MPC · JPL
176102	2001 BB_{61}	—	January 26, 2001	Socorro	LINEAR	PHO	1.8 km	MPC · JPL
176103 Waynejohnson	2001 BE_{61}	Waynejohnson	January 30, 2001	Junk Bond	D. Healy	·	960 m	MPC · JPL
176104	2001 BK_{65}	—	January 26, 2001	Socorro	LINEAR	·	1.4 km	MPC · JPL
176105	2001 CG_{6}	—	February 1, 2001	Socorro	LINEAR	·	1.3 km	MPC · JPL
176106	2001 CG_{14}	—	February 1, 2001	Socorro	LINEAR	·	1.8 km	MPC · JPL
176107	2001 CV_{25}	—	February 1, 2001	Socorro	LINEAR	·	1.3 km	MPC · JPL
176108	2001 CF_{41}	—	February 15, 2001	Socorro	LINEAR	PHO	3.8 km	MPC · JPL
176109	2001 DA_{7}	—	February 16, 2001	Črni Vrh	Matičič, S.	·	2.7 km	MPC · JPL
176110	2001 DO_{7}	—	February 16, 2001	Oizumi	T. Kobayashi	·	1.4 km	MPC · JPL
176111	2001 DY_{9}	—	February 16, 2001	Socorro	LINEAR	V	1.1 km	MPC · JPL
176112	2001 DG_{16}	—	February 16, 2001	Socorro	LINEAR	·	1.9 km	MPC · JPL
176113	2001 DY_{31}	—	February 17, 2001	Socorro	LINEAR	·	1.4 km	MPC · JPL
176114	2001 DL_{57}	—	February 16, 2001	Kitt Peak	Spacewatch	·	1.5 km	MPC · JPL
176115	2001 DT_{61}	—	February 19, 2001	Socorro	LINEAR	·	1.2 km	MPC · JPL
176116	2001 DY_{61}	—	February 19, 2001	Socorro	LINEAR	·	1.0 km	MPC · JPL
176117	2001 DA_{64}	—	February 19, 2001	Socorro	LINEAR	·	1.6 km	MPC · JPL
176118	2001 DL_{76}	—	February 20, 2001	Socorro	LINEAR	·	1.4 km	MPC · JPL
176119	2001 DZ_{77}	—	February 22, 2001	Kitt Peak	Spacewatch	V	860 m	MPC · JPL
176120	2001 DQ_{78}	—	February 22, 2001	Kitt Peak	Spacewatch	·	1.7 km	MPC · JPL
176121	2001 DM_{83}	—	February 23, 2001	Kitt Peak	Spacewatch	(2076)	1.2 km	MPC · JPL
176122	2001 DF_{87}	—	February 24, 2001	Haleakala	NEAT	PHO	4.0 km	MPC · JPL
176123	2001 DG_{87}	—	February 17, 2001	Socorro	LINEAR	·	1.3 km	MPC · JPL
176124	2001 DL_{90}	—	February 22, 2001	Socorro	LINEAR	·	2.5 km	MPC · JPL
176125	2001 DN_{99}	—	February 17, 2001	Socorro	LINEAR	·	1.8 km	MPC · JPL
176126	2001 EA_{5}	—	March 2, 2001	Anderson Mesa	LONEOS	·	1.5 km	MPC · JPL
176127	2001 EM_{11}	—	March 2, 2001	Haleakala	NEAT	·	3.3 km	MPC · JPL
176128	2001 EB_{24}	—	March 15, 2001	Kitt Peak	Spacewatch	·	2.1 km	MPC · JPL
176129	2001 FW_{1}	—	March 16, 2001	Socorro	LINEAR	V	1.2 km	MPC · JPL
176130	2001 FT_{3}	—	March 18, 2001	Socorro	LINEAR	NYS	2.3 km	MPC · JPL
176131	2001 FZ_{10}	—	March 19, 2001	Anderson Mesa	LONEOS	NYS	1.5 km	MPC · JPL
176132	2001 FF_{11}	—	March 19, 2001	Anderson Mesa	LONEOS	·	1.7 km	MPC · JPL
176133	2001 FY_{14}	—	March 19, 2001	Anderson Mesa	LONEOS	·	3.0 km	MPC · JPL
176134	2001 FA_{19}	—	March 19, 2001	Anderson Mesa	LONEOS	·	1.8 km	MPC · JPL
176135	2001 FB_{34}	—	March 18, 2001	Socorro	LINEAR	NYS	1.7 km	MPC · JPL
176136	2001 FN_{38}	—	March 18, 2001	Socorro	LINEAR	PHO	1.6 km	MPC · JPL
176137	2001 FE_{40}	—	March 18, 2001	Socorro	LINEAR	·	1.9 km	MPC · JPL
176138	2001 FW_{61}	—	March 19, 2001	Socorro	LINEAR	·	1.5 km	MPC · JPL
176139	2001 FA_{62}	—	March 19, 2001	Socorro	LINEAR	·	1.4 km	MPC · JPL
176140	2001 FJ_{63}	—	March 19, 2001	Socorro	LINEAR	·	2.0 km	MPC · JPL
176141	2001 FN_{74}	—	March 19, 2001	Socorro	LINEAR	·	2.0 km	MPC · JPL
176142	2001 FG_{77}	—	March 19, 2001	Socorro	LINEAR	·	1.7 km	MPC · JPL
176143	2001 FO_{83}	—	March 26, 2001	Kitt Peak	Spacewatch	NYS	2.0 km	MPC · JPL
176144	2001 FS_{88}	—	March 26, 2001	Kitt Peak	Spacewatch	NYS	1.4 km	MPC · JPL
176145	2001 FM_{90}	—	March 24, 2001	Socorro	LINEAR	NYS	1.6 km	MPC · JPL
176146	2001 FZ_{124}	—	March 29, 2001	Anderson Mesa	LONEOS	·	1.8 km	MPC · JPL
176147	2001 FG_{142}	—	March 23, 2001	Anderson Mesa	LONEOS	NYS	1.5 km	MPC · JPL
176148	2001 FK_{153}	—	March 26, 2001	Socorro	LINEAR	·	2.6 km	MPC · JPL
176149	2001 FP_{157}	—	March 27, 2001	Anderson Mesa	LONEOS	·	2.1 km	MPC · JPL
176150	2001 FY_{160}	—	March 29, 2001	Haleakala	NEAT	·	1.8 km	MPC · JPL
176151	2001 FE_{171}	—	March 24, 2001	Haleakala	NEAT	·	1.4 km	MPC · JPL
176152	2001 FN_{171}	—	March 24, 2001	Kitt Peak	Spacewatch	·	1.6 km	MPC · JPL
176153	2001 FO_{195}	—	March 25, 2001	Kitt Peak	Kitt Peak	·	1.6 km	MPC · JPL
176154	2001 GA	—	April 1, 2001	Ondřejov	P. Kušnirák	(1338) (FLO)	1.1 km	MPC · JPL
176155	2001 GU_{1}	—	April 13, 2001	Kitt Peak	Spacewatch	NYS	1.2 km	MPC · JPL
176156	2001 GZ_{10}	—	April 15, 2001	Haleakala	NEAT	·	1.5 km	MPC · JPL
176157	2001 HX_{11}	—	April 18, 2001	Socorro	LINEAR	NYS	1.7 km	MPC · JPL
176158	2001 HG_{21}	—	April 23, 2001	Socorro	LINEAR	3:2	9.6 km	MPC · JPL
176159	2001 HP_{31}	—	April 26, 2001	Desert Beaver	W. K. Y. Yeung	·	2.4 km	MPC · JPL
176160	2001 HW_{42}	—	April 16, 2001	Anderson Mesa	LONEOS	·	1.6 km	MPC · JPL
176161	2001 HW_{43}	—	April 16, 2001	Anderson Mesa	LONEOS	·	1.5 km	MPC · JPL
176162	2001 HM_{54}	—	April 24, 2001	Socorro	LINEAR	·	2.2 km	MPC · JPL
176163	2001 JV	—	May 12, 2001	Eskridge	G. Hug	·	1.7 km	MPC · JPL
176164	2001 JR_{3}	—	May 15, 2001	Haleakala	NEAT	·	2.4 km	MPC · JPL
176165	2001 JK_{7}	—	May 15, 2001	Anderson Mesa	LONEOS	PHO	1.6 km	MPC · JPL
176166	2001 JV_{8}	—	May 15, 2001	Palomar	NEAT	·	2.0 km	MPC · JPL
176167	2001 KC_{6}	—	May 17, 2001	Socorro	LINEAR	·	3.6 km	MPC · JPL
176168	2001 KX_{6}	—	May 17, 2001	Socorro	LINEAR	·	2.2 km	MPC · JPL
176169	2001 KP_{21}	—	May 17, 2001	Socorro	LINEAR	NYS	1.8 km	MPC · JPL
176170	2001 KA_{34}	—	May 18, 2001	Socorro	LINEAR	·	2.0 km	MPC · JPL
176171	2001 KD_{43}	—	May 22, 2001	Socorro	LINEAR	·	2.5 km	MPC · JPL
176172	2001 KK_{52}	—	May 18, 2001	Anderson Mesa	LONEOS	·	2.2 km	MPC · JPL
176173	2001 KR_{67}	—	May 30, 2001	Socorro	LINEAR	PHO	2.9 km	MPC · JPL
176174	2001 KV_{67}	—	May 29, 2001	Socorro	LINEAR	·	2.9 km	MPC · JPL
176175	2001 KG_{71}	—	May 24, 2001	Anderson Mesa	LONEOS	·	2.0 km	MPC · JPL
176176	2001 KQ_{71}	—	May 24, 2001	Anderson Mesa	LONEOS	NYS	2.1 km	MPC · JPL
176177	2001 MY_{4}	—	June 20, 2001	Palomar	NEAT	·	2.4 km	MPC · JPL
176178	2001 MN_{21}	—	June 27, 2001	Palomar	NEAT	·	1.8 km	MPC · JPL
176179	2001 MA_{22}	—	June 28, 2001	Palomar	NEAT	·	1.7 km	MPC · JPL
176180	2001 NK_{2}	—	July 13, 2001	Palomar	NEAT	·	3.0 km	MPC · JPL
176181	2001 NF_{5}	—	July 13, 2001	Palomar	NEAT	·	3.7 km	MPC · JPL
176182	2001 NQ_{5}	—	July 13, 2001	Palomar	NEAT	·	2.8 km	MPC · JPL
176183	2001 OZ_{1}	—	July 18, 2001	Palomar	NEAT	·	3.1 km	MPC · JPL
176184	2001 OX_{6}	—	July 17, 2001	Anderson Mesa	LONEOS	·	2.3 km	MPC · JPL
176185	2001 OF_{23}	—	July 21, 2001	Palomar	NEAT	·	5.6 km	MPC · JPL
176186	2001 OD_{30}	—	July 19, 2001	Palomar	NEAT	·	2.1 km	MPC · JPL
176187	2001 OX_{31}	—	July 23, 2001	Palomar	NEAT	·	2.7 km	MPC · JPL
176188	2001 OQ_{36}	—	July 19, 2001	Palomar	NEAT	H	850 m	MPC · JPL
176189	2001 OS_{41}	—	July 21, 2001	Palomar	NEAT	·	2.8 km	MPC · JPL
176190	2001 OV_{49}	—	July 17, 2001	Palomar	NEAT	·	2.9 km	MPC · JPL
176191	2001 OY_{53}	—	July 21, 2001	Palomar	NEAT	·	2.5 km	MPC · JPL
176192	2001 OD_{58}	—	July 19, 2001	Palomar	NEAT	·	1.9 km	MPC · JPL
176193	2001 OV_{63}	—	July 23, 2001	Haleakala	NEAT	(5) · slow	2.4 km	MPC · JPL
176194	2001 OS_{67}	—	July 16, 2001	Anderson Mesa	LONEOS	·	3.5 km	MPC · JPL
176195	2001 OD_{96}	—	July 23, 2001	Palomar	NEAT	·	5.3 km	MPC · JPL
176196	2001 OB_{98}	—	July 25, 2001	Haleakala	NEAT	H	850 m	MPC · JPL
176197	2001 OE_{99}	—	July 27, 2001	Anderson Mesa	LONEOS	·	2.7 km	MPC · JPL
176198	2001 PK_{2}	—	August 3, 2001	Haleakala	NEAT	GEF	2.4 km	MPC · JPL
176199	2001 PE_{3}	—	August 3, 2001	Haleakala	NEAT	·	3.4 km	MPC · JPL
176200	2001 PT_{4}	—	August 6, 2001	Haleakala	NEAT	·	2.1 km	MPC · JPL

== 176201–176300 ==
back to top

Designation			Discovery			Properties		Ref
Permanent	Provisional	Named after	Date	Site	Discoverer(s)	Category	Diam.	Ref
176201	2001 PD_{8}	—	August 11, 2001	Palomar	NEAT	·	2.8 km	MPC · JPL
176202	2001 PV_{8}	—	August 11, 2001	Haleakala	NEAT	·	3.0 km	MPC · JPL
176203	2001 PT_{18}	—	August 10, 2001	Palomar	NEAT	·	2.1 km	MPC · JPL
176204	2001 PZ_{57}	—	August 14, 2001	Haleakala	NEAT	·	2.4 km	MPC · JPL
176205	2001 PG_{58}	—	August 14, 2001	Haleakala	NEAT	·	2.6 km	MPC · JPL
176206	2001 PR_{59}	—	August 14, 2001	Haleakala	NEAT	H	1.0 km	MPC · JPL
176207	2001 QK_{4}	—	August 16, 2001	Socorro	LINEAR	·	2.7 km	MPC · JPL
176208	2001 QJ_{18}	—	August 16, 2001	Socorro	LINEAR	·	3.7 km	MPC · JPL
176209	2001 QV_{20}	—	August 16, 2001	Socorro	LINEAR	·	2.7 km	MPC · JPL
176210	2001 QS_{23}	—	August 16, 2001	Socorro	LINEAR	·	2.1 km	MPC · JPL
176211	2001 QX_{24}	—	August 16, 2001	Socorro	LINEAR	·	2.3 km	MPC · JPL
176212	2001 QS_{44}	—	August 16, 2001	Socorro	LINEAR	AGN	2.1 km	MPC · JPL
176213	2001 QU_{46}	—	August 16, 2001	Socorro	LINEAR	·	1.9 km	MPC · JPL
176214	2001 QX_{46}	—	August 16, 2001	Socorro	LINEAR	·	2.4 km	MPC · JPL
176215	2001 QV_{48}	—	August 16, 2001	Socorro	LINEAR	H	870 m	MPC · JPL
176216	2001 QR_{72}	—	August 16, 2001	Palomar	NEAT	·	3.4 km	MPC · JPL
176217	2001 QF_{83}	—	August 17, 2001	Socorro	LINEAR	·	4.0 km	MPC · JPL
176218	2001 QT_{87}	—	August 21, 2001	Haleakala	NEAT	NYS	2.0 km	MPC · JPL
176219	2001 QL_{90}	—	August 20, 2001	Palomar	NEAT	·	4.1 km	MPC · JPL
176220	2001 QX_{91}	—	August 19, 2001	Socorro	LINEAR	·	2.5 km	MPC · JPL
176221	2001 QC_{97}	—	August 17, 2001	Socorro	LINEAR	·	1.9 km	MPC · JPL
176222	2001 QK_{107}	—	August 23, 2001	Socorro	LINEAR	H	820 m	MPC · JPL
176223	2001 QG_{120}	—	August 18, 2001	Socorro	LINEAR	GEF	2.9 km	MPC · JPL
176224	2001 QJ_{123}	—	August 19, 2001	Socorro	LINEAR	·	3.2 km	MPC · JPL
176225	2001 QL_{125}	—	August 19, 2001	Socorro	LINEAR	(5)	2.0 km	MPC · JPL
176226	2001 QO_{125}	—	August 19, 2001	Socorro	LINEAR	·	4.5 km	MPC · JPL
176227	2001 QA_{133}	—	August 21, 2001	Socorro	LINEAR	·	2.9 km	MPC · JPL
176228	2001 QF_{140}	—	August 22, 2001	Socorro	LINEAR	·	5.8 km	MPC · JPL
176229	2001 QL_{150}	—	August 26, 2001	Prescott	P. G. Comba	·	2.5 km	MPC · JPL
176230	2001 QE_{151}	—	August 23, 2001	Socorro	LINEAR	T_{j} (2.91)	4.8 km	MPC · JPL
176231	2001 QS_{156}	—	August 23, 2001	Anderson Mesa	LONEOS	·	4.5 km	MPC · JPL
176232	2001 QB_{158}	—	August 23, 2001	Anderson Mesa	LONEOS	·	2.1 km	MPC · JPL
176233	2001 QV_{162}	—	August 23, 2001	Anderson Mesa	LONEOS	·	3.2 km	MPC · JPL
176234	2001 QJ_{165}	—	August 24, 2001	Haleakala	NEAT	·	3.7 km	MPC · JPL
176235	2001 QB_{166}	—	August 24, 2001	Haleakala	NEAT	MAR	1.8 km	MPC · JPL
176236	2001 QN_{209}	—	August 23, 2001	Anderson Mesa	LONEOS	·	3.4 km	MPC · JPL
176237	2001 QC_{213}	—	August 23, 2001	Anderson Mesa	LONEOS	·	2.7 km	MPC · JPL
176238	2001 QA_{214}	—	August 23, 2001	Anderson Mesa	LONEOS	·	3.0 km	MPC · JPL
176239	2001 QN_{216}	—	August 23, 2001	Anderson Mesa	LONEOS	·	3.9 km	MPC · JPL
176240	2001 QL_{218}	—	August 23, 2001	Anderson Mesa	LONEOS	·	2.6 km	MPC · JPL
176241	2001 QQ_{225}	—	August 24, 2001	Anderson Mesa	LONEOS	·	2.6 km	MPC · JPL
176242	2001 QM_{234}	—	August 24, 2001	Socorro	LINEAR	DOR	4.5 km	MPC · JPL
176243	2001 QL_{235}	—	August 24, 2001	Socorro	LINEAR	·	3.6 km	MPC · JPL
176244	2001 QO_{236}	—	August 24, 2001	Socorro	LINEAR	GAL	2.8 km	MPC · JPL
176245	2001 QJ_{239}	—	August 24, 2001	Socorro	LINEAR	·	3.6 km	MPC · JPL
176246	2001 QV_{241}	—	August 24, 2001	Socorro	LINEAR	·	4.9 km	MPC · JPL
176247	2001 QU_{254}	—	August 25, 2001	Socorro	LINEAR	·	2.0 km	MPC · JPL
176248	2001 QR_{257}	—	August 25, 2001	Socorro	LINEAR	·	3.6 km	MPC · JPL
176249	2001 QV_{257}	—	August 25, 2001	Socorro	LINEAR	·	3.5 km	MPC · JPL
176250	2001 QK_{276}	—	August 19, 2001	Socorro	LINEAR	·	3.3 km	MPC · JPL
176251	2001 QK_{278}	—	August 19, 2001	Socorro	LINEAR	·	2.3 km	MPC · JPL
176252	2001 QM_{289}	—	August 16, 2001	Socorro	LINEAR	·	1.8 km	MPC · JPL
176253	2001 QM_{291}	—	August 16, 2001	Socorro	LINEAR	·	3.4 km	MPC · JPL
176254	2001 QE_{294}	—	August 24, 2001	Anderson Mesa	LONEOS	·	3.6 km	MPC · JPL
176255	2001 QV_{294}	—	August 24, 2001	Socorro	LINEAR	LEO	4.1 km	MPC · JPL
176256	2001 RV_{5}	—	September 9, 2001	Desert Eagle	W. K. Y. Yeung	·	2.4 km	MPC · JPL
176257	2001 RE_{6}	—	September 9, 2001	Socorro	LINEAR	H	990 m	MPC · JPL
176258	2001 RD_{16}	—	September 11, 2001	Socorro	LINEAR	·	2.7 km	MPC · JPL
176259	2001 RB_{24}	—	September 7, 2001	Socorro	LINEAR	·	2.7 km	MPC · JPL
176260	2001 RQ_{24}	—	September 7, 2001	Socorro	LINEAR	NEM	2.3 km	MPC · JPL
176261	2001 RH_{25}	—	September 7, 2001	Socorro	LINEAR	·	3.1 km	MPC · JPL
176262	2001 RO_{31}	—	September 7, 2001	Socorro	LINEAR	·	3.3 km	MPC · JPL
176263	2001 RF_{40}	—	September 10, 2001	Socorro	LINEAR	·	4.2 km	MPC · JPL
176264	2001 RH_{42}	—	September 11, 2001	Socorro	LINEAR	·	1.9 km	MPC · JPL
176265	2001 RE_{47}	—	September 12, 2001	Socorro	LINEAR	H	690 m	MPC · JPL
176266	2001 RO_{51}	—	September 12, 2001	Socorro	LINEAR	·	3.7 km	MPC · JPL
176267	2001 RN_{84}	—	September 11, 2001	Anderson Mesa	LONEOS	·	3.1 km	MPC · JPL
176268	2001 RG_{94}	—	September 11, 2001	Anderson Mesa	LONEOS	·	2.3 km	MPC · JPL
176269	2001 RW_{105}	—	September 12, 2001	Socorro	LINEAR	·	2.3 km	MPC · JPL
176270	2001 RM_{106}	—	September 12, 2001	Socorro	LINEAR	·	2.9 km	MPC · JPL
176271	2001 RH_{111}	—	September 12, 2001	Socorro	LINEAR	AGN	2.0 km	MPC · JPL
176272	2001 RZ_{115}	—	September 12, 2001	Socorro	LINEAR	PAD	3.5 km	MPC · JPL
176273	2001 RK_{121}	—	September 12, 2001	Socorro	LINEAR	·	3.1 km	MPC · JPL
176274	2001 RM_{129}	—	September 12, 2001	Socorro	LINEAR	·	2.8 km	MPC · JPL
176275	2001 RB_{130}	—	September 12, 2001	Socorro	LINEAR	·	2.0 km	MPC · JPL
176276	2001 RC_{135}	—	September 12, 2001	Socorro	LINEAR	·	4.3 km	MPC · JPL
176277	2001 RK_{143}	—	September 7, 2001	Socorro	LINEAR	T_{j} (2.99)	7.8 km	MPC · JPL
176278	2001 RH_{147}	—	September 9, 2001	Socorro	LINEAR	·	2.5 km	MPC · JPL
176279	2001 RH_{153}	—	September 12, 2001	Socorro	LINEAR	·	5.5 km	MPC · JPL
176280	2001 RB_{155}	—	September 12, 2001	Socorro	LINEAR	·	2.7 km	MPC · JPL
176281	2001 RS_{155}	—	September 11, 2001	Socorro	LINEAR	·	2.3 km	MPC · JPL
176282	2001 SZ_{16}	—	September 16, 2001	Socorro	LINEAR	(17392)	2.4 km	MPC · JPL
176283	2001 SJ_{17}	—	September 16, 2001	Socorro	LINEAR	·	2.6 km	MPC · JPL
176284	2001 SE_{23}	—	September 16, 2001	Socorro	LINEAR	·	2.0 km	MPC · JPL
176285	2001 SM_{25}	—	September 16, 2001	Socorro	LINEAR	KOR	1.7 km	MPC · JPL
176286	2001 SZ_{27}	—	September 16, 2001	Socorro	LINEAR	LEO	3.3 km	MPC · JPL
176287	2001 SQ_{38}	—	September 16, 2001	Socorro	LINEAR	·	3.2 km	MPC · JPL
176288	2001 SL_{39}	—	September 16, 2001	Socorro	LINEAR	·	4.1 km	MPC · JPL
176289	2001 SV_{40}	—	September 16, 2001	Socorro	LINEAR	·	3.1 km	MPC · JPL
176290	2001 SL_{57}	—	September 16, 2001	Socorro	LINEAR	·	5.2 km	MPC · JPL
176291	2001 SU_{60}	—	September 17, 2001	Socorro	LINEAR	·	3.6 km	MPC · JPL
176292	2001 SC_{67}	—	September 17, 2001	Socorro	LINEAR	DOR	4.8 km	MPC · JPL
176293	2001 SE_{79}	—	September 20, 2001	Socorro	LINEAR	·	3.6 km	MPC · JPL
176294	2001 SB_{97}	—	September 20, 2001	Socorro	LINEAR	·	3.0 km	MPC · JPL
176295	2001 SW_{97}	—	September 20, 2001	Socorro	LINEAR	·	2.0 km	MPC · JPL
176296	2001 SC_{124}	—	September 16, 2001	Socorro	LINEAR	·	3.9 km	MPC · JPL
176297	2001 SH_{124}	—	September 16, 2001	Socorro	LINEAR	·	3.1 km	MPC · JPL
176298	2001 SR_{125}	—	September 16, 2001	Socorro	LINEAR	WIT	1.4 km	MPC · JPL
176299	2001 SE_{128}	—	September 16, 2001	Socorro	LINEAR	·	4.1 km	MPC · JPL
176300	2001 SX_{135}	—	September 16, 2001	Socorro	LINEAR	·	3.0 km	MPC · JPL

== 176301–176400 ==
back to top

Designation			Discovery			Properties		Ref
Permanent	Provisional	Named after	Date	Site	Discoverer(s)	Category	Diam.	Ref
176301	2001 SR_{137}	—	September 16, 2001	Socorro	LINEAR	·	3.5 km	MPC · JPL
176302	2001 SO_{139}	—	September 16, 2001	Socorro	LINEAR	·	3.0 km	MPC · JPL
176303	2001 SF_{148}	—	September 17, 2001	Socorro	LINEAR	·	3.9 km	MPC · JPL
176304	2001 SN_{148}	—	September 17, 2001	Socorro	LINEAR	·	3.6 km	MPC · JPL
176305	2001 SV_{152}	—	September 17, 2001	Socorro	LINEAR	·	3.9 km	MPC · JPL
176306	2001 SZ_{154}	—	September 17, 2001	Socorro	LINEAR	·	2.8 km	MPC · JPL
176307	2001 SK_{164}	—	September 17, 2001	Socorro	LINEAR	·	4.7 km	MPC · JPL
176308	2001 SB_{165}	—	September 17, 2001	Socorro	LINEAR	·	3.8 km	MPC · JPL
176309	2001 SN_{180}	—	September 19, 2001	Socorro	LINEAR	·	2.5 km	MPC · JPL
176310	2001 SO_{188}	—	September 19, 2001	Socorro	LINEAR	AGN	2.0 km	MPC · JPL
176311	2001 SR_{188}	—	September 19, 2001	Socorro	LINEAR	·	2.8 km	MPC · JPL
176312	2001 SS_{191}	—	September 19, 2001	Socorro	LINEAR	·	2.5 km	MPC · JPL
176313	2001 SK_{192}	—	September 19, 2001	Socorro	LINEAR	KOR	1.7 km	MPC · JPL
176314	2001 SW_{193}	—	September 19, 2001	Socorro	LINEAR	·	2.5 km	MPC · JPL
176315	2001 SE_{195}	—	September 19, 2001	Socorro	LINEAR	·	1.7 km	MPC · JPL
176316	2001 SB_{196}	—	September 19, 2001	Socorro	LINEAR	·	3.7 km	MPC · JPL
176317	2001 SF_{197}	—	September 19, 2001	Socorro	LINEAR	·	2.1 km	MPC · JPL
176318	2001 SB_{201}	—	September 19, 2001	Socorro	LINEAR	·	3.7 km	MPC · JPL
176319	2001 SW_{206}	—	September 19, 2001	Socorro	LINEAR	RAF	1.6 km	MPC · JPL
176320	2001 SN_{209}	—	September 19, 2001	Socorro	LINEAR	GEF	2.2 km	MPC · JPL
176321	2001 SS_{210}	—	September 19, 2001	Socorro	LINEAR	·	3.2 km	MPC · JPL
176322	2001 SB_{212}	—	September 19, 2001	Socorro	LINEAR	·	2.8 km	MPC · JPL
176323	2001 SH_{220}	—	September 19, 2001	Socorro	LINEAR	·	2.8 km	MPC · JPL
176324	2001 SA_{221}	—	September 19, 2001	Socorro	LINEAR	·	2.5 km	MPC · JPL
176325	2001 SU_{223}	—	September 19, 2001	Socorro	LINEAR	·	3.1 km	MPC · JPL
176326	2001 SR_{242}	—	September 19, 2001	Socorro	LINEAR	HOF	4.3 km	MPC · JPL
176327	2001 SP_{251}	—	September 19, 2001	Socorro	LINEAR	·	3.0 km	MPC · JPL
176328	2001 SH_{255}	—	September 19, 2001	Socorro	LINEAR	·	2.5 km	MPC · JPL
176329	2001 SR_{256}	—	September 19, 2001	Socorro	LINEAR	·	3.3 km	MPC · JPL
176330	2001 SB_{271}	—	September 20, 2001	Socorro	LINEAR	·	2.4 km	MPC · JPL
176331	2001 SV_{272}	—	September 26, 2001	Anderson Mesa	LONEOS	·	6.4 km	MPC · JPL
176332	2001 SY_{274}	—	September 18, 2001	Kitt Peak	Spacewatch	KOR	1.6 km	MPC · JPL
176333	2001 SN_{294}	—	September 20, 2001	Socorro	LINEAR	HOF	3.8 km	MPC · JPL
176334	2001 SK_{298}	—	September 20, 2001	Socorro	LINEAR	·	2.1 km	MPC · JPL
176335	2001 SV_{303}	—	September 20, 2001	Socorro	LINEAR	·	3.1 km	MPC · JPL
176336	2001 SC_{307}	—	September 21, 2001	Socorro	LINEAR	AST	3.5 km	MPC · JPL
176337	2001 SG_{313}	—	September 21, 2001	Socorro	LINEAR	MAR	2.1 km	MPC · JPL
176338	2001 SE_{317}	—	September 25, 2001	Palomar	NEAT	MRX	2.4 km	MPC · JPL
176339	2001 SJ_{320}	—	September 21, 2001	Socorro	LINEAR	KOR	1.5 km	MPC · JPL
176340	2001 SF_{341}	—	September 21, 2001	Palomar	NEAT	·	2.3 km	MPC · JPL
176341	2001 SA_{345}	—	September 23, 2001	Palomar	NEAT	·	4.3 km	MPC · JPL
176342	2001 TM_{2}	—	October 6, 2001	Palomar	NEAT	MAR	1.9 km	MPC · JPL
176343	2001 TL_{14}	—	October 7, 2001	Palomar	NEAT	·	3.5 km	MPC · JPL
176344	2001 TE_{16}	—	October 11, 2001	Socorro	LINEAR	EOS	3.4 km	MPC · JPL
176345	2001 TS_{16}	—	October 11, 2001	Socorro	LINEAR	·	8.7 km	MPC · JPL
176346	2001 TC_{17}	—	October 14, 2001	Ondřejov	P. Kušnirák, P. Pravec	·	2.8 km	MPC · JPL
176347	2001 TQ_{31}	—	October 14, 2001	Socorro	LINEAR	·	4.8 km	MPC · JPL
176348	2001 TU_{36}	—	October 14, 2001	Socorro	LINEAR	H	1.3 km	MPC · JPL
176349	2001 TM_{48}	—	October 9, 2001	Kitt Peak	Spacewatch	·	2.5 km	MPC · JPL
176350	2001 TR_{53}	—	October 13, 2001	Socorro	LINEAR	·	3.5 km	MPC · JPL
176351	2001 TA_{64}	—	October 13, 2001	Socorro	LINEAR	·	3.3 km	MPC · JPL
176352	2001 TH_{84}	—	October 14, 2001	Socorro	LINEAR	·	3.3 km	MPC · JPL
176353	2001 TK_{84}	—	October 14, 2001	Socorro	LINEAR	·	3.0 km	MPC · JPL
176354	2001 TF_{85}	—	October 14, 2001	Socorro	LINEAR	·	2.5 km	MPC · JPL
176355	2001 TW_{86}	—	October 14, 2001	Socorro	LINEAR	·	2.6 km	MPC · JPL
176356	2001 TH_{89}	—	October 14, 2001	Socorro	LINEAR	·	3.5 km	MPC · JPL
176357	2001 TY_{98}	—	October 14, 2001	Socorro	LINEAR	·	3.3 km	MPC · JPL
176358	2001 TC_{99}	—	October 14, 2001	Socorro	LINEAR	·	3.4 km	MPC · JPL
176359	2001 TK_{100}	—	October 14, 2001	Socorro	LINEAR	EOS	2.9 km	MPC · JPL
176360	2001 TD_{102}	—	October 15, 2001	Socorro	LINEAR	·	4.1 km	MPC · JPL
176361	2001 TM_{104}	—	October 15, 2001	Desert Eagle	W. K. Y. Yeung	·	3.9 km	MPC · JPL
176362	2001 TT_{104}	—	October 13, 2001	Socorro	LINEAR	·	3.0 km	MPC · JPL
176363	2001 TD_{117}	—	October 14, 2001	Socorro	LINEAR	·	4.9 km	MPC · JPL
176364	2001 TG_{122}	—	October 15, 2001	Socorro	LINEAR	·	3.4 km	MPC · JPL
176365	2001 TV_{130}	—	October 10, 2001	Palomar	NEAT	·	2.8 km	MPC · JPL
176366	2001 TD_{139}	—	October 10, 2001	Palomar	NEAT	·	5.0 km	MPC · JPL
176367	2001 TQ_{154}	—	October 15, 2001	Palomar	NEAT	·	3.2 km	MPC · JPL
176368	2001 TQ_{157}	—	October 14, 2001	Kitt Peak	Spacewatch	·	2.3 km	MPC · JPL
176369	2001 TO_{160}	—	October 15, 2001	Kitt Peak	Spacewatch	KOR	1.5 km	MPC · JPL
176370	2001 TX_{177}	—	October 14, 2001	Socorro	LINEAR	GEF	2.2 km	MPC · JPL
176371	2001 TK_{185}	—	October 14, 2001	Socorro	LINEAR	HYG	3.5 km	MPC · JPL
176372	2001 TN_{195}	—	October 15, 2001	Palomar	NEAT	·	3.1 km	MPC · JPL
176373	2001 TT_{195}	—	October 15, 2001	Palomar	NEAT	·	4.9 km	MPC · JPL
176374	2001 TN_{204}	—	October 11, 2001	Socorro	LINEAR	·	2.7 km	MPC · JPL
176375	2001 TB_{221}	—	October 14, 2001	Socorro	LINEAR	·	2.9 km	MPC · JPL
176376	2001 TT_{229}	—	October 15, 2001	Socorro	LINEAR	·	4.9 km	MPC · JPL
176377	2001 TE_{235}	—	October 15, 2001	Palomar	NEAT	·	3.2 km	MPC · JPL
176378	2001 TH_{237}	—	October 8, 2001	Palomar	NEAT	·	6.3 km	MPC · JPL
176379	2001 TP_{240}	—	October 14, 2001	Socorro	LINEAR	·	3.6 km	MPC · JPL
176380 Goran	2001 TE_{248}	Goran	October 14, 2001	Apache Point	SDSS	KOR	1.6 km	MPC · JPL
176381	2001 TX_{256}	—	October 14, 2001	Socorro	LINEAR	·	3.2 km	MPC · JPL
176382	2001 TP_{258}	—	October 15, 2001	Haleakala	NEAT	·	2.1 km	MPC · JPL
176383	2001 UK_{18}	—	October 16, 2001	Kitt Peak	Spacewatch	·	2.0 km	MPC · JPL
176384	2001 UX_{22}	—	October 18, 2001	Socorro	LINEAR	GEF	2.2 km	MPC · JPL
176385	2001 UT_{23}	—	October 18, 2001	Socorro	LINEAR	EUN	2.4 km	MPC · JPL
176386	2001 UM_{32}	—	October 16, 2001	Socorro	LINEAR	·	3.2 km	MPC · JPL
176387	2001 UE_{41}	—	October 17, 2001	Socorro	LINEAR	·	2.6 km	MPC · JPL
176388	2001 UR_{57}	—	October 17, 2001	Socorro	LINEAR	KOR	1.8 km	MPC · JPL
176389	2001 UO_{60}	—	October 17, 2001	Socorro	LINEAR	HOF	4.7 km	MPC · JPL
176390	2001 UO_{63}	—	October 17, 2001	Socorro	LINEAR	·	3.0 km	MPC · JPL
176391	2001 UY_{81}	—	October 20, 2001	Socorro	LINEAR	EOS	2.4 km	MPC · JPL
176392	2001 UL_{84}	—	October 21, 2001	Socorro	LINEAR	·	3.5 km	MPC · JPL
176393	2001 UU_{84}	—	October 21, 2001	Socorro	LINEAR	·	2.3 km	MPC · JPL
176394	2001 UA_{86}	—	October 16, 2001	Kitt Peak	Spacewatch	KOR · fast	2.1 km	MPC · JPL
176395	2001 UL_{125}	—	October 22, 2001	Palomar	NEAT	·	6.5 km	MPC · JPL
176396	2001 UG_{126}	—	October 23, 2001	Palomar	NEAT	·	4.3 km	MPC · JPL
176397	2001 UK_{132}	—	October 20, 2001	Socorro	LINEAR	ARM	5.4 km	MPC · JPL
176398	2001 UT_{144}	—	October 23, 2001	Socorro	LINEAR	EOS	2.6 km	MPC · JPL
176399	2001 UU_{145}	—	October 23, 2001	Socorro	LINEAR	·	3.1 km	MPC · JPL
176400	2001 UC_{146}	—	October 23, 2001	Socorro	LINEAR	·	2.9 km	MPC · JPL

== 176401–176500 ==
back to top

Designation			Discovery			Properties		Ref
Permanent	Provisional	Named after	Date	Site	Discoverer(s)	Category	Diam.	Ref
176401	2001 UT_{147}	—	October 23, 2001	Socorro	LINEAR	·	1.9 km	MPC · JPL
176402	2001 UY_{147}	—	October 23, 2001	Socorro	LINEAR	·	2.7 km	MPC · JPL
176403	2001 UZ_{149}	—	October 23, 2001	Socorro	LINEAR	·	2.6 km	MPC · JPL
176404	2001 UW_{172}	—	October 18, 2001	Palomar	NEAT	·	2.9 km	MPC · JPL
176405	2001 UW_{174}	—	October 19, 2001	Haleakala	NEAT	TIR	4.4 km	MPC · JPL
176406	2001 UW_{175}	—	October 19, 2001	Kitt Peak	Spacewatch	·	2.0 km	MPC · JPL
176407	2001 UK_{178}	—	October 23, 2001	Palomar	NEAT	·	2.5 km	MPC · JPL
176408	2001 UP_{197}	—	October 19, 2001	Socorro	LINEAR	·	3.8 km	MPC · JPL
176409	2001 UM_{212}	—	October 21, 2001	Socorro	LINEAR	·	2.3 km	MPC · JPL
176410	2001 UO_{212}	—	October 21, 2001	Kitt Peak	Spacewatch	·	2.2 km	MPC · JPL
176411	2001 UU_{220}	—	October 21, 2001	Socorro	LINEAR	·	2.8 km	MPC · JPL
176412	2001 VW_{1}	—	November 9, 2001	Eskridge	G. Hug	(58892)	5.9 km	MPC · JPL
176413	2001 VW_{4}	—	November 11, 2001	Socorro	LINEAR	·	4.4 km	MPC · JPL
176414	2001 VO_{7}	—	November 9, 2001	Socorro	LINEAR	·	2.2 km	MPC · JPL
176415	2001 VR_{7}	—	November 9, 2001	Socorro	LINEAR	EMA	4.6 km	MPC · JPL
176416	2001 VL_{9}	—	November 9, 2001	Socorro	LINEAR	·	4.5 km	MPC · JPL
176417	2001 VQ_{9}	—	November 9, 2001	Socorro	LINEAR	TEL	2.0 km	MPC · JPL
176418	2001 VF_{15}	—	November 10, 2001	Socorro	LINEAR	·	3.3 km	MPC · JPL
176419	2001 VM_{16}	—	November 10, 2001	Palomar	NEAT	·	4.4 km	MPC · JPL
176420	2001 VX_{18}	—	November 9, 2001	Socorro	LINEAR	·	3.4 km	MPC · JPL
176421	2001 VB_{25}	—	November 9, 2001	Socorro	LINEAR	EOS	3.1 km	MPC · JPL
176422	2001 VU_{26}	—	November 9, 2001	Socorro	LINEAR	·	3.9 km	MPC · JPL
176423	2001 VF_{28}	—	November 9, 2001	Socorro	LINEAR	·	4.3 km	MPC · JPL
176424	2001 VR_{37}	—	November 9, 2001	Socorro	LINEAR	·	4.4 km	MPC · JPL
176425	2001 VQ_{67}	—	November 10, 2001	Socorro	LINEAR	·	1.4 km	MPC · JPL
176426	2001 VT_{70}	—	November 11, 2001	Socorro	LINEAR	·	2.9 km	MPC · JPL
176427	2001 VS_{73}	—	November 11, 2001	Socorro	LINEAR	·	3.4 km	MPC · JPL
176428	2001 VP_{77}	—	November 12, 2001	Haleakala	NEAT	·	3.1 km	MPC · JPL
176429	2001 VA_{89}	—	November 12, 2001	Socorro	LINEAR	·	3.4 km	MPC · JPL
176430	2001 VD_{92}	—	November 15, 2001	Socorro	LINEAR	·	3.7 km	MPC · JPL
176431	2001 VT_{106}	—	November 12, 2001	Socorro	LINEAR	·	3.1 km	MPC · JPL
176432	2001 VZ_{109}	—	November 12, 2001	Socorro	LINEAR	·	3.5 km	MPC · JPL
176433	2001 VR_{110}	—	November 12, 2001	Socorro	LINEAR	·	3.8 km	MPC · JPL
176434	2001 VD_{120}	—	November 12, 2001	Socorro	LINEAR	·	5.0 km	MPC · JPL
176435	2001 WC_{18}	—	November 17, 2001	Socorro	LINEAR	·	4.0 km	MPC · JPL
176436	2001 WV_{24}	—	November 18, 2001	Kitt Peak	Spacewatch	TIR · slow	4.3 km	MPC · JPL
176437	2001 WG_{25}	—	November 17, 2001	Socorro	LINEAR	·	3.2 km	MPC · JPL
176438	2001 WR_{25}	—	November 17, 2001	Socorro	LINEAR	NAE	5.1 km	MPC · JPL
176439	2001 WX_{31}	—	November 17, 2001	Socorro	LINEAR	·	4.5 km	MPC · JPL
176440	2001 WD_{38}	—	November 17, 2001	Socorro	LINEAR	DOR	5.9 km	MPC · JPL
176441	2001 WA_{40}	—	November 17, 2001	Socorro	LINEAR	·	4.4 km	MPC · JPL
176442	2001 WJ_{51}	—	November 19, 2001	Socorro	LINEAR	(16286)	3.0 km	MPC · JPL
176443	2001 WG_{55}	—	November 19, 2001	Socorro	LINEAR	·	2.7 km	MPC · JPL
176444	2001 WQ_{77}	—	November 20, 2001	Socorro	LINEAR	·	2.9 km	MPC · JPL
176445	2001 WG_{85}	—	November 20, 2001	Socorro	LINEAR	KOR	2.2 km	MPC · JPL
176446	2001 XC_{2}	—	December 8, 2001	Socorro	LINEAR	T_{j} (2.96)	5.3 km	MPC · JPL
176447	2001 XE_{15}	—	December 10, 2001	Socorro	LINEAR	·	5.7 km	MPC · JPL
176448	2001 XU_{19}	—	December 9, 2001	Socorro	LINEAR	EOS	4.0 km	MPC · JPL
176449	2001 XD_{21}	—	December 9, 2001	Socorro	LINEAR	·	7.2 km	MPC · JPL
176450	2001 XM_{38}	—	December 9, 2001	Socorro	LINEAR	·	4.6 km	MPC · JPL
176451	2001 XT_{40}	—	December 9, 2001	Socorro	LINEAR	EMA	5.3 km	MPC · JPL
176452	2001 XW_{40}	—	December 9, 2001	Socorro	LINEAR	·	4.5 km	MPC · JPL
176453	2001 XG_{42}	—	December 9, 2001	Socorro	LINEAR	·	4.6 km	MPC · JPL
176454	2001 XO_{43}	—	December 9, 2001	Socorro	LINEAR	·	6.3 km	MPC · JPL
176455	2001 XL_{57}	—	December 10, 2001	Socorro	LINEAR	·	2.9 km	MPC · JPL
176456	2001 XS_{69}	—	December 11, 2001	Socorro	LINEAR	·	2.3 km	MPC · JPL
176457	2001 XM_{72}	—	December 11, 2001	Socorro	LINEAR	·	3.4 km	MPC · JPL
176458	2001 XE_{74}	—	December 11, 2001	Socorro	LINEAR	·	4.2 km	MPC · JPL
176459	2001 XT_{78}	—	December 11, 2001	Socorro	LINEAR	·	4.3 km	MPC · JPL
176460	2001 XT_{79}	—	December 11, 2001	Socorro	LINEAR	·	5.0 km	MPC · JPL
176461	2001 XX_{90}	—	December 10, 2001	Socorro	LINEAR	EOS	2.9 km	MPC · JPL
176462	2001 XU_{94}	—	December 10, 2001	Socorro	LINEAR	·	4.5 km	MPC · JPL
176463	2001 XV_{97}	—	December 10, 2001	Socorro	LINEAR	·	4.7 km	MPC · JPL
176464	2001 XB_{108}	—	December 10, 2001	Socorro	LINEAR	·	3.7 km	MPC · JPL
176465	2001 XD_{121}	—	December 14, 2001	Socorro	LINEAR	EOS	2.7 km	MPC · JPL
176466	2001 XE_{122}	—	December 14, 2001	Socorro	LINEAR	·	2.4 km	MPC · JPL
176467	2001 XD_{125}	—	December 14, 2001	Socorro	LINEAR	·	2.3 km	MPC · JPL
176468	2001 XA_{147}	—	December 14, 2001	Socorro	LINEAR	THM	3.3 km	MPC · JPL
176469	2001 XP_{147}	—	December 14, 2001	Socorro	LINEAR	·	4.0 km	MPC · JPL
176470	2001 XF_{148}	—	December 14, 2001	Socorro	LINEAR	·	3.3 km	MPC · JPL
176471	2001 XA_{149}	—	December 14, 2001	Socorro	LINEAR	EOS	3.1 km	MPC · JPL
176472	2001 XG_{149}	—	December 14, 2001	Socorro	LINEAR	KOR	2.4 km	MPC · JPL
176473	2001 XL_{154}	—	December 14, 2001	Socorro	LINEAR	·	3.1 km	MPC · JPL
176474	2001 XX_{154}	—	December 14, 2001	Socorro	LINEAR	·	4.1 km	MPC · JPL
176475	2001 XO_{156}	—	December 14, 2001	Socorro	LINEAR	·	5.2 km	MPC · JPL
176476	2001 XM_{164}	—	December 14, 2001	Socorro	LINEAR	·	8.2 km	MPC · JPL
176477	2001 XY_{164}	—	December 14, 2001	Socorro	LINEAR	EOS	3.3 km	MPC · JPL
176478	2001 XY_{173}	—	December 14, 2001	Socorro	LINEAR	·	4.9 km	MPC · JPL
176479	2001 XF_{175}	—	December 14, 2001	Socorro	LINEAR	·	4.3 km	MPC · JPL
176480	2001 XJ_{181}	—	December 14, 2001	Socorro	LINEAR	·	4.7 km	MPC · JPL
176481	2001 XX_{200}	—	December 15, 2001	Socorro	LINEAR	EOS	3.3 km	MPC · JPL
176482	2001 XF_{204}	—	December 11, 2001	Socorro	LINEAR	·	2.6 km	MPC · JPL
176483	2001 XT_{207}	—	December 11, 2001	Socorro	LINEAR	·	3.2 km	MPC · JPL
176484	2001 XA_{209}	—	December 11, 2001	Socorro	LINEAR	·	4.3 km	MPC · JPL
176485	2001 XR_{211}	—	December 11, 2001	Socorro	LINEAR	·	4.3 km	MPC · JPL
176486	2001 XR_{225}	—	December 15, 2001	Socorro	LINEAR	·	6.1 km	MPC · JPL
176487	2001 XW_{229}	—	December 15, 2001	Socorro	LINEAR	·	2.2 km	MPC · JPL
176488	2001 XF_{230}	—	December 15, 2001	Socorro	LINEAR	KOR	2.2 km	MPC · JPL
176489	2001 XH_{231}	—	December 15, 2001	Socorro	LINEAR	EOS	3.0 km	MPC · JPL
176490	2001 XC_{232}	—	December 15, 2001	Socorro	LINEAR	·	3.8 km	MPC · JPL
176491	2001 XD_{234}	—	December 15, 2001	Socorro	LINEAR	HYG	4.3 km	MPC · JPL
176492	2001 XO_{235}	—	December 15, 2001	Socorro	LINEAR	HYG	3.6 km	MPC · JPL
176493	2001 XD_{237}	—	December 15, 2001	Socorro	LINEAR	·	5.2 km	MPC · JPL
176494	2001 XX_{237}	—	December 15, 2001	Socorro	LINEAR	·	1.3 km	MPC · JPL
176495	2001 XB_{251}	—	December 14, 2001	Socorro	LINEAR	·	4.1 km	MPC · JPL
176496	2001 XC_{251}	—	December 14, 2001	Socorro	LINEAR	EOS	2.7 km	MPC · JPL
176497	2001 XZ_{257}	—	December 7, 2001	Palomar	NEAT	H	1.3 km	MPC · JPL
176498	2001 XU_{265}	—	December 15, 2001	Socorro	LINEAR	KOR	2.4 km	MPC · JPL
176499	2001 YC	—	December 17, 2001	Oaxaca	Roe, J. M.	·	3.6 km	MPC · JPL
176500	2001 YL_{2}	—	December 18, 2001	Kingsnake	J. V. McClusky	·	5.7 km	MPC · JPL

== 176501–176600 ==
back to top

Designation			Discovery			Properties		Ref
Permanent	Provisional	Named after	Date	Site	Discoverer(s)	Category	Diam.	Ref
176501	2001 YU_{13}	—	December 17, 2001	Socorro	LINEAR	KOR	2.1 km	MPC · JPL
176502	2001 YN_{14}	—	December 17, 2001	Socorro	LINEAR	·	3.3 km	MPC · JPL
176503	2001 YZ_{17}	—	December 17, 2001	Socorro	LINEAR	·	3.2 km	MPC · JPL
176504	2001 YV_{24}	—	December 18, 2001	Socorro	LINEAR	·	2.6 km	MPC · JPL
176505	2001 YF_{29}	—	December 18, 2001	Socorro	LINEAR	KOR	2.0 km	MPC · JPL
176506	2001 YO_{33}	—	December 18, 2001	Socorro	LINEAR	·	4.9 km	MPC · JPL
176507	2001 YL_{34}	—	December 18, 2001	Socorro	LINEAR	·	3.8 km	MPC · JPL
176508	2001 YQ_{46}	—	December 18, 2001	Socorro	LINEAR	·	5.9 km	MPC · JPL
176509	2001 YB_{49}	—	December 18, 2001	Socorro	LINEAR	·	4.1 km	MPC · JPL
176510	2001 YW_{50}	—	December 18, 2001	Socorro	LINEAR	HYG	3.6 km	MPC · JPL
176511	2001 YK_{59}	—	December 18, 2001	Socorro	LINEAR	·	3.5 km	MPC · JPL
176512	2001 YU_{59}	—	December 18, 2001	Socorro	LINEAR	·	5.8 km	MPC · JPL
176513	2001 YN_{63}	—	December 18, 2001	Socorro	LINEAR	·	3.7 km	MPC · JPL
176514	2001 YZ_{65}	—	December 18, 2001	Socorro	LINEAR	THM	7.5 km	MPC · JPL
176515	2001 YM_{66}	—	December 18, 2001	Socorro	LINEAR	HYG	4.0 km	MPC · JPL
176516	2001 YC_{68}	—	December 18, 2001	Socorro	LINEAR	·	5.1 km	MPC · JPL
176517	2001 YY_{75}	—	December 18, 2001	Socorro	LINEAR	EOS	3.1 km	MPC · JPL
176518	2001 YD_{76}	—	December 18, 2001	Socorro	LINEAR	·	4.4 km	MPC · JPL
176519	2001 YY_{77}	—	December 18, 2001	Socorro	LINEAR	·	3.9 km	MPC · JPL
176520	2001 YF_{83}	—	December 18, 2001	Socorro	LINEAR	·	4.1 km	MPC · JPL
176521	2001 YP_{93}	—	December 17, 2001	Kitt Peak	Spacewatch	THM	2.8 km	MPC · JPL
176522	2001 YQ_{93}	—	December 17, 2001	Kitt Peak	Spacewatch	·	4.4 km	MPC · JPL
176523	2001 YO_{111}	—	December 18, 2001	Anderson Mesa	LONEOS	·	6.9 km	MPC · JPL
176524	2001 YU_{118}	—	December 18, 2001	Socorro	LINEAR	·	1.3 km	MPC · JPL
176525	2001 YV_{118}	—	December 18, 2001	Socorro	LINEAR	·	5.2 km	MPC · JPL
176526	2001 YL_{121}	—	December 17, 2001	Socorro	LINEAR	·	4.7 km	MPC · JPL
176527	2001 YE_{124}	—	December 17, 2001	Socorro	LINEAR	·	3.8 km	MPC · JPL
176528	2001 YY_{137}	—	December 22, 2001	Socorro	LINEAR	·	7.8 km	MPC · JPL
176529	2001 YD_{152}	—	December 19, 2001	Palomar	NEAT	·	5.4 km	MPC · JPL
176530	2001 YZ_{153}	—	December 19, 2001	Palomar	NEAT	EOS	3.0 km	MPC · JPL
176531	2001 YK_{156}	—	December 20, 2001	Palomar	NEAT	·	4.8 km	MPC · JPL
176532 Boskri	2002 AF_{2}	Boskri	January 5, 2002	Vicques	M. Ory	·	4.2 km	MPC · JPL
176533	2002 AP_{6}	—	January 5, 2002	Cima Ekar	ADAS	EOS	2.7 km	MPC · JPL
176534	2002 AK_{10}	—	January 4, 2002	Haleakala	NEAT	·	6.8 km	MPC · JPL
176535	2002 AA_{14}	—	January 12, 2002	Desert Eagle	W. K. Y. Yeung	·	6.4 km	MPC · JPL
176536	2002 AA_{15}	—	January 6, 2002	Socorro	LINEAR	·	5.6 km	MPC · JPL
176537	2002 AA_{17}	—	January 5, 2002	Haleakala	NEAT	TIR	5.3 km	MPC · JPL
176538	2002 AM_{27}	—	January 5, 2002	Anderson Mesa	LONEOS	·	3.9 km	MPC · JPL
176539	2002 AU_{30}	—	January 9, 2002	Socorro	LINEAR	·	3.8 km	MPC · JPL
176540	2002 AD_{50}	—	January 9, 2002	Socorro	LINEAR	·	3.3 km	MPC · JPL
176541	2002 AR_{52}	—	January 9, 2002	Socorro	LINEAR	·	7.5 km	MPC · JPL
176542	2002 AE_{72}	—	January 8, 2002	Socorro	LINEAR	·	5.8 km	MPC · JPL
176543	2002 AR_{77}	—	January 8, 2002	Socorro	LINEAR	·	4.7 km	MPC · JPL
176544	2002 AK_{81}	—	January 9, 2002	Socorro	LINEAR	EOS	3.0 km	MPC · JPL
176545	2002 AM_{87}	—	January 9, 2002	Socorro	LINEAR	·	4.6 km	MPC · JPL
176546	2002 AC_{89}	—	January 9, 2002	Socorro	LINEAR	EUP	5.5 km	MPC · JPL
176547	2002 AQ_{90}	—	January 12, 2002	Socorro	LINEAR	TIR	4.3 km	MPC · JPL
176548	2002 AX_{103}	—	January 9, 2002	Socorro	LINEAR	·	3.4 km	MPC · JPL
176549	2002 AV_{108}	—	January 9, 2002	Socorro	LINEAR	·	4.2 km	MPC · JPL
176550	2002 AS_{110}	—	January 9, 2002	Socorro	LINEAR	·	8.1 km	MPC · JPL
176551	2002 AY_{115}	—	January 9, 2002	Socorro	LINEAR	EOS	3.5 km	MPC · JPL
176552	2002 AG_{125}	—	January 11, 2002	Socorro	LINEAR	T_{j} (2.94)	5.7 km	MPC · JPL
176553	2002 AD_{126}	—	January 11, 2002	Socorro	LINEAR	EUP	7.7 km	MPC · JPL
176554	2002 AA_{131}	—	January 12, 2002	Palomar	NEAT	·	6.0 km	MPC · JPL
176555	2002 AE_{132}	—	January 8, 2002	Socorro	LINEAR	EOS	3.0 km	MPC · JPL
176556	2002 AF_{134}	—	January 9, 2002	Socorro	LINEAR	THM	2.6 km	MPC · JPL
176557	2002 AZ_{136}	—	January 9, 2002	Socorro	LINEAR	·	5.0 km	MPC · JPL
176558	2002 AV_{137}	—	January 9, 2002	Socorro	LINEAR	EOS	3.3 km	MPC · JPL
176559	2002 AP_{138}	—	January 9, 2002	Socorro	LINEAR	·	3.2 km	MPC · JPL
176560	2002 AW_{140}	—	January 13, 2002	Socorro	LINEAR	·	4.7 km	MPC · JPL
176561	2002 AW_{143}	—	January 13, 2002	Socorro	LINEAR	·	3.9 km	MPC · JPL
176562	2002 AW_{146}	—	January 13, 2002	Socorro	LINEAR	LIX	5.1 km	MPC · JPL
176563	2002 AT_{154}	—	January 14, 2002	Socorro	LINEAR	·	5.9 km	MPC · JPL
176564	2002 AX_{158}	—	January 13, 2002	Socorro	LINEAR	HYG	4.5 km	MPC · JPL
176565	2002 AG_{161}	—	January 13, 2002	Socorro	LINEAR	·	5.7 km	MPC · JPL
176566	2002 AZ_{180}	—	January 5, 2002	Palomar	NEAT	TIR	3.3 km	MPC · JPL
176567	2002 AU_{184}	—	January 8, 2002	Palomar	NEAT	·	4.1 km	MPC · JPL
176568	2002 AU_{188}	—	January 10, 2002	Palomar	NEAT	·	5.9 km	MPC · JPL
176569	2002 AW_{190}	—	January 11, 2002	Socorro	LINEAR	CYB	9.1 km	MPC · JPL
176570	2002 AU_{208}	—	January 12, 2002	Palomar	NEAT	·	3.8 km	MPC · JPL
176571	2002 BZ_{2}	—	January 18, 2002	Anderson Mesa	LONEOS	·	3.3 km	MPC · JPL
176572	2002 BN_{12}	—	January 20, 2002	Kitt Peak	Spacewatch	·	1.1 km	MPC · JPL
176573	2002 BC_{13}	—	January 18, 2002	Socorro	LINEAR	·	7.5 km	MPC · JPL
176574	2002 BU_{15}	—	January 19, 2002	Socorro	LINEAR	·	5.4 km	MPC · JPL
176575	2002 CS_{1}	—	February 3, 2002	Palomar	NEAT	·	4.7 km	MPC · JPL
176576	2002 CE_{5}	—	February 4, 2002	Palomar	NEAT	VER	5.3 km	MPC · JPL
176577	2002 CB_{17}	—	February 6, 2002	Socorro	LINEAR	EOS	3.0 km	MPC · JPL
176578	2002 CF_{32}	—	February 6, 2002	Socorro	LINEAR	(5651)	5.8 km	MPC · JPL
176579	2002 CX_{39}	—	February 4, 2002	Haleakala	NEAT	·	7.2 km	MPC · JPL
176580	2002 CP_{49}	—	February 3, 2002	Haleakala	NEAT	THM	3.7 km	MPC · JPL
176581	2002 CZ_{63}	—	February 6, 2002	Socorro	LINEAR	·	5.3 km	MPC · JPL
176582	2002 CP_{77}	—	February 7, 2002	Socorro	LINEAR	·	4.2 km	MPC · JPL
176583	2002 CY_{87}	—	February 7, 2002	Socorro	LINEAR	HYG	4.3 km	MPC · JPL
176584	2002 CA_{116}	—	February 13, 2002	Socorro	LINEAR	T_{j} (2.92)	6.8 km	MPC · JPL
176585	2002 CK_{121}	—	February 7, 2002	Socorro	LINEAR	·	7.2 km	MPC · JPL
176586	2002 CY_{123}	—	February 7, 2002	Socorro	LINEAR	·	4.7 km	MPC · JPL
176587	2002 CG_{134}	—	February 7, 2002	Socorro	LINEAR	·	4.5 km	MPC · JPL
176588	2002 CY_{139}	—	February 8, 2002	Socorro	LINEAR	·	5.4 km	MPC · JPL
176589	2002 CB_{159}	—	February 7, 2002	Socorro	LINEAR	·	6.6 km	MPC · JPL
176590	2002 CB_{162}	—	February 8, 2002	Socorro	LINEAR	URS	8.0 km	MPC · JPL
176591	2002 CZ_{172}	—	February 8, 2002	Socorro	LINEAR	·	5.8 km	MPC · JPL
176592	2002 CS_{175}	—	February 10, 2002	Socorro	LINEAR	·	5.4 km	MPC · JPL
176593	2002 CB_{176}	—	February 10, 2002	Socorro	LINEAR	·	6.0 km	MPC · JPL
176594	2002 CA_{182}	—	February 10, 2002	Socorro	LINEAR	·	5.4 km	MPC · JPL
176595	2002 CC_{238}	—	February 11, 2002	Socorro	LINEAR	·	5.4 km	MPC · JPL
176596	2002 CV_{245}	—	February 11, 2002	Socorro	LINEAR	·	4.8 km	MPC · JPL
176597	2002 CO_{246}	—	February 15, 2002	Kitt Peak	Spacewatch	·	4.2 km	MPC · JPL
176598	2002 CJ_{281}	—	February 8, 2002	Kitt Peak	Spacewatch	·	3.8 km	MPC · JPL
176599	2002 CZ_{294}	—	February 10, 2002	Socorro	LINEAR	·	4.6 km	MPC · JPL
176600	2002 CU_{310}	—	February 8, 2002	Socorro	LINEAR	·	1.2 km	MPC · JPL

== 176601–176700 ==
back to top

Designation			Discovery			Properties		Ref
Permanent	Provisional	Named after	Date	Site	Discoverer(s)	Category	Diam.	Ref
176601	2002 DR_{7}	—	February 19, 2002	Socorro	LINEAR	THB	5.7 km	MPC · JPL
176602	2002 DS_{9}	—	February 19, 2002	Socorro	LINEAR	TIR	5.9 km	MPC · JPL
176603	2002 EZ_{41}	—	March 12, 2002	Socorro	LINEAR	·	1.4 km	MPC · JPL
176604	2002 ED_{48}	—	March 12, 2002	Palomar	NEAT	·	1.2 km	MPC · JPL
176605	2002 EQ_{58}	—	March 13, 2002	Socorro	LINEAR	·	1.0 km	MPC · JPL
176606	2002 EE_{65}	—	March 13, 2002	Socorro	LINEAR	·	4.6 km	MPC · JPL
176607	2002 EN_{67}	—	March 13, 2002	Socorro	LINEAR	·	940 m	MPC · JPL
176608	2002 EQ_{110}	—	March 9, 2002	Catalina	CSS	·	5.9 km	MPC · JPL
176609	2002 FM_{6}	—	March 16, 2002	Anderson Mesa	LONEOS	EUP	7.2 km	MPC · JPL
176610 Nuñez	2002 FW_{18}	Nuñez	March 18, 2002	Kitt Peak	M. W. Buie	·	950 m	MPC · JPL
176611	2002 FC_{29}	—	March 20, 2002	Socorro	LINEAR	·	1.9 km	MPC · JPL
176612	2002 FO_{30}	—	March 20, 2002	Socorro	LINEAR	·	1.0 km	MPC · JPL
176613	2002 GA_{39}	—	April 3, 2002	Palomar	NEAT	·	6.0 km	MPC · JPL
176614	2002 GA_{45}	—	April 4, 2002	Palomar	NEAT	·	1.3 km	MPC · JPL
176615	2002 GN_{57}	—	April 8, 2002	Palomar	NEAT	·	950 m	MPC · JPL
176616	2002 GS_{65}	—	April 8, 2002	Palomar	NEAT	·	2.3 km	MPC · JPL
176617	2002 GO_{89}	—	April 8, 2002	Palomar	NEAT	·	3.1 km	MPC · JPL
176618	2002 GR_{99}	—	April 10, 2002	Socorro	LINEAR	·	820 m	MPC · JPL
176619	2002 GP_{112}	—	April 10, 2002	Socorro	LINEAR	·	1.4 km	MPC · JPL
176620	2002 HJ_{14}	—	April 16, 2002	Socorro	LINEAR	·	990 m	MPC · JPL
176621	2002 JP_{10}	—	May 7, 2002	Socorro	LINEAR	T_{j} (2.99) · 3:2	9.5 km	MPC · JPL
176622	2002 JJ_{16}	—	May 8, 2002	Socorro	LINEAR	·	1.1 km	MPC · JPL
176623	2002 JH_{19}	—	May 7, 2002	Palomar	NEAT	·	1.5 km	MPC · JPL
176624	2002 JR_{39}	—	May 10, 2002	Desert Eagle	W. K. Y. Yeung	·	1.4 km	MPC · JPL
176625	2002 JW_{70}	—	May 8, 2002	Socorro	LINEAR	·	1.3 km	MPC · JPL
176626	2002 JB_{84}	—	May 11, 2002	Socorro	LINEAR	·	1.0 km	MPC · JPL
176627	2002 JY_{104}	—	May 11, 2002	Socorro	LINEAR	·	1.0 km	MPC · JPL
176628	2002 JP_{115}	—	May 15, 2002	Haleakala	NEAT	·	1.1 km	MPC · JPL
176629	2002 JA_{145}	—	May 13, 2002	Palomar	NEAT	·	1.3 km	MPC · JPL
176630	2002 JK_{147}	—	May 9, 2002	Socorro	LINEAR	·	1.0 km	MPC · JPL
176631	2002 KA	—	May 16, 2002	Fountain Hills	Hills, Fountain	CYB	7.2 km	MPC · JPL
176632	2002 LG_{6}	—	June 7, 2002	Palomar	NEAT	·	1.0 km	MPC · JPL
176633	2002 LK_{12}	—	June 5, 2002	Socorro	LINEAR	·	1.4 km	MPC · JPL
176634	2002 LW_{38}	—	June 7, 2002	Socorro	LINEAR	·	1.4 km	MPC · JPL
176635	2002 LS_{40}	—	June 10, 2002	Socorro	LINEAR	·	1.3 km	MPC · JPL
176636	2002 LT_{42}	—	June 10, 2002	Socorro	LINEAR	·	3.1 km	MPC · JPL
176637	2002 LD_{43}	—	June 10, 2002	Socorro	LINEAR	fast	1.4 km	MPC · JPL
176638	2002 MA_{2}	—	June 16, 2002	Palomar	NEAT	·	1.0 km	MPC · JPL
176639	2002 NG_{1}	—	July 4, 2002	Desert Eagle	W. K. Y. Yeung	·	1.2 km	MPC · JPL
176640	2002 NP_{6}	—	July 11, 2002	Campo Imperatore	CINEOS	MAS	970 m	MPC · JPL
176641	2002 NQ_{9}	—	July 3, 2002	Palomar	NEAT	·	2.6 km	MPC · JPL
176642	2002 NT_{10}	—	July 4, 2002	Palomar	NEAT	·	2.0 km	MPC · JPL
176643	2002 NB_{11}	—	July 4, 2002	Palomar	NEAT	·	1.3 km	MPC · JPL
176644	2002 ND_{16}	—	July 5, 2002	Socorro	LINEAR	·	1.2 km	MPC · JPL
176645	2002 NE_{19}	—	July 9, 2002	Socorro	LINEAR	·	1.4 km	MPC · JPL
176646	2002 NM_{19}	—	July 9, 2002	Socorro	LINEAR	·	1.2 km	MPC · JPL
176647	2002 NN_{25}	—	July 9, 2002	Socorro	LINEAR	·	2.1 km	MPC · JPL
176648	2002 NC_{40}	—	July 14, 2002	Palomar	NEAT	·	3.8 km	MPC · JPL
176649	2002 NX_{40}	—	July 14, 2002	Palomar	NEAT	NYS	1.3 km	MPC · JPL
176650	2002 NV_{45}	—	July 13, 2002	Palomar	NEAT	·	1.9 km	MPC · JPL
176651	2002 NP_{52}	—	July 14, 2002	Palomar	NEAT	V	1.0 km	MPC · JPL
176652	2002 NP_{53}	—	July 14, 2002	Palomar	NEAT	(5)	1.6 km	MPC · JPL
176653	2002 NM_{59}	—	July 14, 2002	Palomar	NEAT	·	1.4 km	MPC · JPL
176654	2002 NY_{59}	—	July 4, 2002	Palomar	NEAT	·	1.5 km	MPC · JPL
176655	2002 NP_{61}	—	July 6, 2002	Palomar	NEAT	·	1.9 km	MPC · JPL
176656	2002 NZ_{65}	—	July 9, 2002	Palomar	NEAT	·	1.5 km	MPC · JPL
176657	2002 ON	—	July 17, 2002	Socorro	LINEAR	·	4.5 km	MPC · JPL
176658	2002 OZ_{6}	—	July 20, 2002	Palomar	NEAT	·	2.2 km	MPC · JPL
176659	2002 OA_{9}	—	July 21, 2002	Palomar	NEAT	·	1.5 km	MPC · JPL
176660	2002 OC_{11}	—	July 22, 2002	Palomar	NEAT	NYS	1.7 km	MPC · JPL
176661	2002 OW_{17}	—	July 18, 2002	Socorro	LINEAR	V	1.1 km	MPC · JPL
176662	2002 OX_{26}	—	July 22, 2002	Palomar	NEAT	·	1.1 km	MPC · JPL
176663	2002 OO_{27}	—	July 21, 2002	Palomar	NEAT	·	2.0 km	MPC · JPL
176664	2002 PM_{15}	—	August 6, 2002	Palomar	NEAT	·	1.3 km	MPC · JPL
176665	2002 PG_{25}	—	August 6, 2002	Palomar	NEAT	·	1.5 km	MPC · JPL
176666	2002 PJ_{25}	—	August 6, 2002	Palomar	NEAT	NYS	1.7 km	MPC · JPL
176667	2002 PT_{28}	—	August 6, 2002	Palomar	NEAT	(2076)	1.2 km	MPC · JPL
176668	2002 PC_{32}	—	August 6, 2002	Palomar	NEAT	NYS	1.5 km	MPC · JPL
176669	2002 PV_{33}	—	August 6, 2002	Campo Imperatore	CINEOS	·	1.8 km	MPC · JPL
176670	2002 PW_{33}	—	August 6, 2002	Campo Imperatore	CINEOS	·	1.2 km	MPC · JPL
176671	2002 PR_{38}	—	August 6, 2002	Palomar	NEAT	·	2.1 km	MPC · JPL
176672	2002 PR_{39}	—	August 7, 2002	Palomar	NEAT	MAS	1.1 km	MPC · JPL
176673	2002 PO_{41}	—	August 5, 2002	Socorro	LINEAR	RAF	2.2 km	MPC · JPL
176674	2002 PD_{51}	—	August 8, 2002	Palomar	NEAT	NYS	1.5 km	MPC · JPL
176675	2002 PS_{51}	—	August 8, 2002	Palomar	NEAT	NYS	1.5 km	MPC · JPL
176676	2002 PE_{62}	—	August 8, 2002	Palomar	NEAT	·	2.5 km	MPC · JPL
176677	2002 PL_{62}	—	August 8, 2002	Palomar	NEAT	V	990 m	MPC · JPL
176678	2002 PX_{63}	—	August 4, 2002	Palomar	NEAT	·	1.8 km	MPC · JPL
176679	2002 PB_{68}	—	August 6, 2002	Palomar	NEAT	·	1.1 km	MPC · JPL
176680	2002 PT_{79}	—	August 13, 2002	Tenagra	Tenagra	·	1.7 km	MPC · JPL
176681	2002 PJ_{88}	—	August 12, 2002	Socorro	LINEAR	·	1.4 km	MPC · JPL
176682	2002 PU_{91}	—	August 14, 2002	Socorro	LINEAR	·	1.3 km	MPC · JPL
176683	2002 PV_{91}	—	August 14, 2002	Socorro	LINEAR	NYS	1.8 km	MPC · JPL
176684	2002 PA_{100}	—	August 14, 2002	Socorro	LINEAR	NYS	1.5 km	MPC · JPL
176685	2002 PV_{102}	—	August 12, 2002	Socorro	LINEAR	·	2.8 km	MPC · JPL
176686	2002 PE_{103}	—	August 12, 2002	Socorro	LINEAR	·	2.1 km	MPC · JPL
176687	2002 PY_{129}	—	August 15, 2002	Anderson Mesa	LONEOS	·	1.8 km	MPC · JPL
176688	2002 PM_{132}	—	August 14, 2002	Socorro	LINEAR	·	1.5 km	MPC · JPL
176689	2002 PY_{133}	—	August 14, 2002	Socorro	LINEAR	·	1.7 km	MPC · JPL
176690	2002 PQ_{136}	—	August 15, 2002	Anderson Mesa	LONEOS	·	1.8 km	MPC · JPL
176691	2002 PQ_{160}	—	August 8, 2002	Palomar	S. F. Hönig	·	1.9 km	MPC · JPL
176692	2002 PR_{169}	—	August 8, 2002	Palomar	NEAT	·	1.4 km	MPC · JPL
176693	2002 PF_{172}	—	August 15, 2002	Palomar	NEAT	·	1.4 km	MPC · JPL
176694	2002 PY_{172}	—	August 11, 2002	Palomar	NEAT	MAS	900 m	MPC · JPL
176695	2002 QR_{11}	—	August 26, 2002	Palomar	NEAT	(5)	1.8 km	MPC · JPL
176696	2002 QJ_{15}	—	August 16, 2002	Socorro	LINEAR	·	1.5 km	MPC · JPL
176697	2002 QE_{20}	—	August 28, 2002	Palomar	NEAT	·	1.7 km	MPC · JPL
176698	2002 QG_{21}	—	August 28, 2002	Palomar	NEAT	·	1.8 km	MPC · JPL
176699	2002 QE_{22}	—	August 27, 2002	Palomar	NEAT	V	1.1 km	MPC · JPL
176700	2002 QW_{22}	—	August 27, 2002	Palomar	NEAT	·	1.2 km	MPC · JPL

== 176701–176800 ==
back to top

Designation			Discovery			Properties		Ref
Permanent	Provisional	Named after	Date	Site	Discoverer(s)	Category	Diam.	Ref
176701	2002 QQ_{25}	—	August 29, 2002	Kitt Peak	Spacewatch	·	3.5 km	MPC · JPL
176702	2002 QY_{27}	—	August 28, 2002	Palomar	NEAT	·	1.9 km	MPC · JPL
176703	2002 QK_{30}	—	August 29, 2002	Palomar	NEAT	·	1.9 km	MPC · JPL
176704	2002 QC_{33}	—	August 29, 2002	Palomar	NEAT	·	1.6 km	MPC · JPL
176705	2002 QC_{37}	—	August 30, 2002	Kitt Peak	Spacewatch	·	1.9 km	MPC · JPL
176706	2002 QD_{44}	—	August 30, 2002	Palomar	NEAT	V	1.1 km	MPC · JPL
176707	2002 QZ_{51}	—	August 18, 2002	Palomar	S. F. Hönig	V	930 m	MPC · JPL
176708	2002 QY_{53}	—	August 29, 2002	Palomar	S. F. Hönig	·	1.7 km	MPC · JPL
176709	2002 QJ_{56}	—	August 29, 2002	Palomar	S. F. Hönig	·	1.4 km	MPC · JPL
176710 Banff	2002 QR_{56}	Banff	August 17, 2002	Haleakala	Lowe, A.	·	1.9 km	MPC · JPL
176711 Canmore	2002 QM_{57}	Canmore	August 17, 2002	Palomar	Lowe, A.	·	1.7 km	MPC · JPL
176712	2002 QB_{66}	—	August 19, 2002	Palomar	NEAT	·	1.2 km	MPC · JPL
176713	2002 QO_{66}	—	August 20, 2002	Palomar	NEAT	·	3.0 km	MPC · JPL
176714	2002 QH_{67}	—	August 18, 2002	Palomar	NEAT	·	970 m	MPC · JPL
176715	2002 QJ_{67}	—	August 29, 2002	Palomar	NEAT	(2076)	1.1 km	MPC · JPL
176716	2002 QO_{75}	—	August 28, 2002	Palomar	NEAT	·	1.8 km	MPC · JPL
176717	2002 QG_{80}	—	August 17, 2002	Palomar	NEAT	·	1.4 km	MPC · JPL
176718	2002 QY_{83}	—	August 19, 2002	Palomar	NEAT	·	1.4 km	MPC · JPL
176719	2002 QR_{84}	—	August 27, 2002	Palomar	NEAT	·	1.5 km	MPC · JPL
176720	2002 QN_{85}	—	August 17, 2002	Palomar	NEAT	V	890 m	MPC · JPL
176721	2002 QZ_{89}	—	August 19, 2002	Palomar	NEAT	·	1.9 km	MPC · JPL
176722	2002 QO_{94}	—	August 27, 2002	Palomar	NEAT	·	2.5 km	MPC · JPL
176723	2002 QL_{96}	—	August 16, 2002	Palomar	NEAT	V	880 m	MPC · JPL
176724	2002 RH_{2}	—	September 4, 2002	Anderson Mesa	LONEOS	NYS	1.7 km	MPC · JPL
176725	2002 RS_{20}	—	September 4, 2002	Anderson Mesa	LONEOS	·	1.3 km	MPC · JPL
176726	2002 RG_{26}	—	September 3, 2002	Campo Imperatore	CINEOS	·	1.9 km	MPC · JPL
176727	2002 RB_{35}	—	September 4, 2002	Anderson Mesa	LONEOS	·	4.2 km	MPC · JPL
176728	2002 RJ_{42}	—	September 5, 2002	Socorro	LINEAR	·	1.6 km	MPC · JPL
176729	2002 RG_{43}	—	September 5, 2002	Socorro	LINEAR	·	1.3 km	MPC · JPL
176730	2002 RQ_{44}	—	September 5, 2002	Socorro	LINEAR	(5)	1.9 km	MPC · JPL
176731	2002 RZ_{48}	—	September 5, 2002	Socorro	LINEAR	slow	2.7 km	MPC · JPL
176732	2002 RP_{49}	—	September 5, 2002	Socorro	LINEAR	·	1.9 km	MPC · JPL
176733	2002 RC_{51}	—	September 5, 2002	Socorro	LINEAR	(5)	2.1 km	MPC · JPL
176734	2002 RB_{52}	—	September 5, 2002	Socorro	LINEAR	·	2.3 km	MPC · JPL
176735	2002 RS_{54}	—	September 5, 2002	Socorro	LINEAR	·	2.1 km	MPC · JPL
176736	2002 RO_{56}	—	September 5, 2002	Anderson Mesa	LONEOS	·	2.1 km	MPC · JPL
176737	2002 RO_{61}	—	September 5, 2002	Socorro	LINEAR	·	2.1 km	MPC · JPL
176738	2002 RU_{70}	—	September 4, 2002	Palomar	NEAT	·	2.2 km	MPC · JPL
176739	2002 RW_{73}	—	September 5, 2002	Socorro	LINEAR	·	2.0 km	MPC · JPL
176740	2002 RL_{74}	—	September 5, 2002	Socorro	LINEAR	·	1.8 km	MPC · JPL
176741	2002 RX_{74}	—	September 5, 2002	Socorro	LINEAR	·	1.3 km	MPC · JPL
176742	2002 RG_{81}	—	September 5, 2002	Socorro	LINEAR	·	2.2 km	MPC · JPL
176743	2002 RV_{83}	—	September 5, 2002	Socorro	LINEAR	·	2.1 km	MPC · JPL
176744	2002 RJ_{84}	—	September 5, 2002	Socorro	LINEAR	·	2.0 km	MPC · JPL
176745	2002 RN_{94}	—	September 5, 2002	Socorro	LINEAR	·	1.4 km	MPC · JPL
176746	2002 RZ_{95}	—	September 5, 2002	Socorro	LINEAR	·	2.2 km	MPC · JPL
176747	2002 RO_{100}	—	September 5, 2002	Socorro	LINEAR	(5)	1.9 km	MPC · JPL
176748	2002 RL_{103}	—	September 5, 2002	Socorro	LINEAR	·	2.1 km	MPC · JPL
176749	2002 RG_{113}	—	September 5, 2002	Anderson Mesa	LONEOS	·	1.2 km	MPC · JPL
176750	2002 RF_{114}	—	September 5, 2002	Socorro	LINEAR	·	1.6 km	MPC · JPL
176751	2002 RS_{114}	—	September 5, 2002	Campo Imperatore	CINEOS	·	1.9 km	MPC · JPL
176752	2002 RX_{115}	—	September 6, 2002	Socorro	LINEAR	·	1.8 km	MPC · JPL
176753	2002 RB_{132}	—	September 11, 2002	Palomar	NEAT	EUN	1.4 km	MPC · JPL
176754	2002 RK_{134}	—	September 10, 2002	Palomar	NEAT	·	1.8 km	MPC · JPL
176755	2002 RB_{139}	—	September 10, 2002	Palomar	NEAT	·	1.9 km	MPC · JPL
176756	2002 RQ_{139}	—	September 10, 2002	Palomar	NEAT	slow	2.0 km	MPC · JPL
176757	2002 RG_{140}	—	September 11, 2002	Haleakala	NEAT	·	2.0 km	MPC · JPL
176758	2002 RF_{141}	—	September 10, 2002	Palomar	NEAT	·	2.0 km	MPC · JPL
176759	2002 RR_{141}	—	September 10, 2002	Haleakala	NEAT	·	1.5 km	MPC · JPL
176760	2002 RX_{148}	—	September 11, 2002	Haleakala	NEAT	·	1.8 km	MPC · JPL
176761	2002 RO_{153}	—	September 12, 2002	Palomar	NEAT	JUN	1.5 km	MPC · JPL
176762	2002 RM_{160}	—	September 12, 2002	Palomar	NEAT	V	1.0 km	MPC · JPL
176763	2002 RM_{181}	—	September 13, 2002	Socorro	LINEAR	·	3.2 km	MPC · JPL
176764	2002 RO_{187}	—	September 11, 2002	Kvistaberg	Uppsala-DLR Asteroid Survey	MAR	1.5 km	MPC · JPL
176765	2002 RL_{189}	—	September 14, 2002	Palomar	NEAT	MAS	910 m	MPC · JPL
176766	2002 RA_{190}	—	September 14, 2002	Palomar	NEAT	·	1.6 km	MPC · JPL
176767	2002 RN_{190}	—	September 14, 2002	Palomar	NEAT	MAS	1.1 km	MPC · JPL
176768	2002 RX_{190}	—	September 13, 2002	Socorro	LINEAR	EUN	1.8 km	MPC · JPL
176769	2002 RS_{196}	—	September 12, 2002	Haleakala	NEAT	(5)	1.7 km	MPC · JPL
176770	2002 RJ_{199}	—	September 13, 2002	Palomar	NEAT	NYS	1.3 km	MPC · JPL
176771	2002 RS_{203}	—	September 14, 2002	Palomar	NEAT	V	990 m	MPC · JPL
176772	2002 RD_{205}	—	September 14, 2002	Palomar	NEAT	·	1.8 km	MPC · JPL
176773	2002 RY_{205}	—	September 14, 2002	Palomar	NEAT	·	2.2 km	MPC · JPL
176774	2002 RG_{225}	—	September 13, 2002	Palomar	NEAT	V	1.1 km	MPC · JPL
176775	2002 RG_{228}	—	September 14, 2002	Haleakala	NEAT	·	2.0 km	MPC · JPL
176776	2002 RV_{229}	—	September 14, 2002	Haleakala	NEAT	EUN	1.7 km	MPC · JPL
176777	2002 RA_{236}	—	September 14, 2002	Palomar	R. Matson	·	1.4 km	MPC · JPL
176778	2002 RF_{242}	—	September 14, 2002	Palomar	R. Matson	V	1.0 km	MPC · JPL
176779	2002 RU_{246}	—	September 4, 2002	Palomar	NEAT	PHO	1.5 km	MPC · JPL
176780	2002 RE_{247}	—	September 15, 2002	Palomar	NEAT	V	1.1 km	MPC · JPL
176781	2002 RK_{266}	—	September 4, 2002	Palomar	NEAT	·	1.3 km	MPC · JPL
176782	2002 RG_{272}	—	September 4, 2002	Palomar	NEAT	·	1.5 km	MPC · JPL
176783	2002 SP_{1}	—	September 26, 2002	Palomar	NEAT	·	1.8 km	MPC · JPL
176784	2002 SN_{8}	—	September 27, 2002	Palomar	NEAT	·	1.3 km	MPC · JPL
176785	2002 SR_{10}	—	September 27, 2002	Palomar	NEAT	·	2.8 km	MPC · JPL
176786	2002 SZ_{14}	—	September 27, 2002	Palomar	NEAT	PHO	3.1 km	MPC · JPL
176787	2002 SJ_{16}	—	September 27, 2002	Palomar	NEAT	·	3.4 km	MPC · JPL
176788	2002 SF_{19}	—	September 27, 2002	Palomar	NEAT	·	1.8 km	MPC · JPL
176789	2002 SO_{22}	—	September 26, 2002	Palomar	NEAT	EUN ·	3.7 km	MPC · JPL
176790	2002 SA_{34}	—	September 29, 2002	Haleakala	NEAT	EUN	1.9 km	MPC · JPL
176791	2002 SU_{35}	—	September 29, 2002	Haleakala	NEAT	MAR	1.9 km	MPC · JPL
176792	2002 SA_{41}	—	September 30, 2002	Haleakala	NEAT	(5)	1.9 km	MPC · JPL
176793	2002 SL_{43}	—	September 28, 2002	Haleakala	NEAT	(5)	1.3 km	MPC · JPL
176794	2002 SH_{46}	—	September 29, 2002	Haleakala	NEAT	·	2.3 km	MPC · JPL
176795	2002 SU_{49}	—	September 30, 2002	Socorro	LINEAR	·	2.0 km	MPC · JPL
176796	2002 SL_{58}	—	September 30, 2002	Haleakala	NEAT	·	2.1 km	MPC · JPL
176797	2002 TY_{2}	—	October 1, 2002	Anderson Mesa	LONEOS	·	1.8 km	MPC · JPL
176798	2002 TF_{3}	—	October 1, 2002	Anderson Mesa	LONEOS	·	1.8 km	MPC · JPL
176799	2002 TY_{5}	—	October 1, 2002	Anderson Mesa	LONEOS	(5)	1.8 km	MPC · JPL
176800	2002 TB_{6}	—	October 1, 2002	Socorro	LINEAR	(5)	2.1 km	MPC · JPL

== 176801–176900 ==
back to top

Designation			Discovery			Properties		Ref
Permanent	Provisional	Named after	Date	Site	Discoverer(s)	Category	Diam.	Ref
176801	2002 TQ_{9}	—	October 1, 2002	Socorro	LINEAR	·	1.6 km	MPC · JPL
176802	2002 TS_{9}	—	October 1, 2002	Socorro	LINEAR	·	2.1 km	MPC · JPL
176803	2002 TO_{10}	—	October 2, 2002	Haleakala	NEAT	·	1.2 km	MPC · JPL
176804	2002 TK_{21}	—	October 2, 2002	Socorro	LINEAR	·	1.5 km	MPC · JPL
176805	2002 TJ_{26}	—	October 2, 2002	Socorro	LINEAR	·	1.5 km	MPC · JPL
176806	2002 TR_{26}	—	October 2, 2002	Socorro	LINEAR	DOR	3.5 km	MPC · JPL
176807	2002 TW_{26}	—	October 2, 2002	Socorro	LINEAR	(5)	2.2 km	MPC · JPL
176808	2002 TD_{31}	—	October 2, 2002	Socorro	LINEAR	·	2.1 km	MPC · JPL
176809	2002 TD_{32}	—	October 2, 2002	Socorro	LINEAR	·	2.2 km	MPC · JPL
176810	2002 TD_{47}	—	October 2, 2002	Socorro	LINEAR	(5)	1.6 km	MPC · JPL
176811	2002 TW_{54}	—	October 2, 2002	Socorro	LINEAR	·	3.0 km	MPC · JPL
176812	2002 TG_{55}	—	October 2, 2002	Haleakala	NEAT	·	1.5 km	MPC · JPL
176813	2002 TZ_{64}	—	October 5, 2002	Socorro	LINEAR	EUN	1.8 km	MPC · JPL
176814	2002 TD_{74}	—	October 3, 2002	Palomar	NEAT	·	2.5 km	MPC · JPL
176815	2002 TF_{75}	—	October 1, 2002	Anderson Mesa	LONEOS	·	1.6 km	MPC · JPL
176816	2002 TT_{82}	—	October 2, 2002	Socorro	LINEAR	·	1.8 km	MPC · JPL
176817	2002 TH_{95}	—	October 3, 2002	Socorro	LINEAR	NYS	2.0 km	MPC · JPL
176818	2002 TY_{96}	—	October 1, 2002	Haleakala	NEAT	·	3.6 km	MPC · JPL
176819	2002 TF_{100}	—	October 4, 2002	Socorro	LINEAR	NYS	2.4 km	MPC · JPL
176820	2002 TO_{100}	—	October 4, 2002	Socorro	LINEAR	·	2.0 km	MPC · JPL
176821	2002 TW_{102}	—	October 4, 2002	Socorro	LINEAR	·	1.5 km	MPC · JPL
176822	2002 TU_{103}	—	October 4, 2002	Socorro	LINEAR	·	2.0 km	MPC · JPL
176823	2002 TD_{108}	—	October 1, 2002	Socorro	LINEAR	·	4.3 km	MPC · JPL
176824	2002 TH_{109}	—	October 2, 2002	Haleakala	NEAT	·	2.1 km	MPC · JPL
176825	2002 TK_{111}	—	October 3, 2002	Palomar	NEAT	ADE	2.7 km	MPC · JPL
176826	2002 TF_{132}	—	October 4, 2002	Socorro	LINEAR	·	2.1 km	MPC · JPL
176827	2002 TZ_{154}	—	October 5, 2002	Palomar	NEAT	·	3.3 km	MPC · JPL
176828	2002 TY_{162}	—	October 5, 2002	Palomar	NEAT	·	2.4 km	MPC · JPL
176829	2002 TH_{166}	—	October 3, 2002	Socorro	LINEAR	·	2.2 km	MPC · JPL
176830	2002 TS_{169}	—	October 3, 2002	Socorro	LINEAR	(5)	1.7 km	MPC · JPL
176831	2002 TZ_{173}	—	October 4, 2002	Socorro	LINEAR	·	1.9 km	MPC · JPL
176832	2002 TA_{176}	—	October 4, 2002	Anderson Mesa	LONEOS	·	2.6 km	MPC · JPL
176833	2002 TQ_{184}	—	October 4, 2002	Socorro	LINEAR	KON	2.4 km	MPC · JPL
176834	2002 TP_{187}	—	October 4, 2002	Socorro	LINEAR	V	1.2 km	MPC · JPL
176835	2002 TF_{189}	—	October 5, 2002	Socorro	LINEAR	EUN	1.7 km	MPC · JPL
176836	2002 TT_{197}	—	October 4, 2002	Socorro	LINEAR	·	3.5 km	MPC · JPL
176837	2002 TD_{207}	—	October 4, 2002	Socorro	LINEAR	(5)	2.1 km	MPC · JPL
176838	2002 TJ_{207}	—	October 4, 2002	Socorro	LINEAR	·	5.3 km	MPC · JPL
176839	2002 TG_{208}	—	October 4, 2002	Socorro	LINEAR	·	2.1 km	MPC · JPL
176840	2002 TA_{210}	—	October 7, 2002	Socorro	LINEAR	·	1.6 km	MPC · JPL
176841	2002 TQ_{214}	—	October 4, 2002	Socorro	LINEAR	·	2.3 km	MPC · JPL
176842	2002 TA_{216}	—	October 5, 2002	Anderson Mesa	LONEOS	·	2.3 km	MPC · JPL
176843	2002 TP_{219}	—	October 5, 2002	Socorro	LINEAR	EUN	1.7 km	MPC · JPL
176844	2002 TU_{220}	—	October 6, 2002	Socorro	LINEAR	·	2.3 km	MPC · JPL
176845	2002 TL_{227}	—	October 8, 2002	Anderson Mesa	LONEOS	·	1.8 km	MPC · JPL
176846	2002 TV_{227}	—	October 8, 2002	Anderson Mesa	LONEOS	·	1.6 km	MPC · JPL
176847	2002 TE_{229}	—	October 7, 2002	Haleakala	NEAT	·	2.0 km	MPC · JPL
176848	2002 TG_{229}	—	October 7, 2002	Haleakala	NEAT	·	1.9 km	MPC · JPL
176849	2002 TK_{230}	—	October 6, 2002	Haleakala	NEAT	·	4.1 km	MPC · JPL
176850	2002 TM_{233}	—	October 6, 2002	Socorro	LINEAR	·	4.4 km	MPC · JPL
176851	2002 TA_{234}	—	October 6, 2002	Socorro	LINEAR	BRG	2.5 km	MPC · JPL
176852	2002 TQ_{239}	—	October 9, 2002	Socorro	LINEAR	·	1.9 km	MPC · JPL
176853	2002 TS_{246}	—	October 9, 2002	Socorro	LINEAR	·	1.9 km	MPC · JPL
176854	2002 TF_{250}	—	October 7, 2002	Socorro	LINEAR	(5)	1.6 km	MPC · JPL
176855	2002 TC_{258}	—	October 9, 2002	Socorro	LINEAR	·	1.9 km	MPC · JPL
176856	2002 TY_{261}	—	October 10, 2002	Palomar	NEAT	·	1.3 km	MPC · JPL
176857	2002 TZ_{264}	—	October 10, 2002	Socorro	LINEAR	MIS	4.7 km	MPC · JPL
176858	2002 TW_{265}	—	October 10, 2002	Socorro	LINEAR	·	3.3 km	MPC · JPL
176859	2002 TQ_{269}	—	October 9, 2002	Socorro	LINEAR	V	1.2 km	MPC · JPL
176860	2002 TS_{274}	—	October 9, 2002	Socorro	LINEAR	·	2.0 km	MPC · JPL
176861	2002 TX_{280}	—	October 10, 2002	Socorro	LINEAR	RAF	1.7 km	MPC · JPL
176862	2002 TU_{286}	—	October 10, 2002	Socorro	LINEAR	·	4.2 km	MPC · JPL
176863	2002 TL_{295}	—	October 13, 2002	Palomar	NEAT	·	2.6 km	MPC · JPL
176864	2002 TR_{295}	—	October 13, 2002	Palomar	NEAT	·	3.5 km	MPC · JPL
176865	2002 TB_{296}	—	October 13, 2002	Palomar	NEAT	EUN	2.2 km	MPC · JPL
176866 Kuropatkin	2002 TO_{316}	Kuropatkin	October 4, 2002	Apache Point	SDSS	·	2.4 km	MPC · JPL
176867 Brianlee	2002 TA_{321}	Brianlee	October 5, 2002	Apache Point	SDSS	·	1.4 km	MPC · JPL
176868	2002 TF_{374}	—	October 15, 2002	Palomar	NEAT	·	2.1 km	MPC · JPL
176869	2002 UH	—	October 18, 2002	Palomar	NEAT	·	1.6 km	MPC · JPL
176870	2002 UB_{1}	—	October 27, 2002	Socorro	LINEAR	·	3.1 km	MPC · JPL
176871	2002 UP_{3}	—	October 29, 2002	Socorro	LINEAR	·	4.3 km	MPC · JPL
176872	2002 US_{7}	—	October 28, 2002	Palomar	NEAT	·	3.2 km	MPC · JPL
176873	2002 UP_{22}	—	October 30, 2002	Haleakala	NEAT	·	3.0 km	MPC · JPL
176874	2002 UB_{23}	—	October 30, 2002	Haleakala	NEAT	·	2.6 km	MPC · JPL
176875	2002 UC_{23}	—	October 30, 2002	Haleakala	NEAT	·	1.8 km	MPC · JPL
176876	2002 UU_{31}	—	October 30, 2002	Haleakala	NEAT	·	3.6 km	MPC · JPL
176877	2002 UQ_{37}	—	October 31, 2002	Kitt Peak	Spacewatch	·	1.7 km	MPC · JPL
176878	2002 UL_{39}	—	October 31, 2002	Palomar	NEAT	·	2.2 km	MPC · JPL
176879	2002 UR_{40}	—	October 31, 2002	Socorro	LINEAR	ADE	3.1 km	MPC · JPL
176880	2002 UB_{41}	—	October 31, 2002	Palomar	NEAT	·	1.8 km	MPC · JPL
176881	2002 UT_{44}	—	October 30, 2002	Socorro	LINEAR	·	2.2 km	MPC · JPL
176882	2002 UC_{49}	—	October 31, 2002	Socorro	LINEAR	·	2.4 km	MPC · JPL
176883	2002 UF_{50}	—	October 31, 2002	Socorro	LINEAR	·	4.1 km	MPC · JPL
176884 Jallynsmith	2002 UZ_{58}	Jallynsmith	October 29, 2002	Apache Point	SDSS	·	2.6 km	MPC · JPL
176885	2002 UV_{72}	—	October 16, 2002	Anderson Mesa	LONEOS	·	3.0 km	MPC · JPL
176886	2002 VG	—	November 1, 2002	Socorro	LINEAR	·	2.9 km	MPC · JPL
176887	2002 VL	—	November 1, 2002	Pla D'Arguines	D'Arguines, Pla	PHO	2.1 km	MPC · JPL
176888	2002 VP_{6}	—	November 5, 2002	Anderson Mesa	LONEOS	·	2.5 km	MPC · JPL
176889	2002 VO_{9}	—	November 1, 2002	Palomar	NEAT	(5)	1.6 km	MPC · JPL
176890	2002 VJ_{21}	—	November 5, 2002	Socorro	LINEAR	·	2.6 km	MPC · JPL
176891	2002 VR_{31}	—	November 5, 2002	Socorro	LINEAR	·	2.8 km	MPC · JPL
176892	2002 VA_{32}	—	November 5, 2002	Socorro	LINEAR	·	2.6 km	MPC · JPL
176893	2002 VT_{37}	—	November 5, 2002	Socorro	LINEAR	·	3.0 km	MPC · JPL
176894	2002 VA_{41}	—	November 1, 2002	Palomar	NEAT	·	2.0 km	MPC · JPL
176895	2002 VJ_{43}	—	November 4, 2002	Palomar	NEAT	·	2.0 km	MPC · JPL
176896	2002 VO_{44}	—	November 4, 2002	Haleakala	NEAT	·	2.4 km	MPC · JPL
176897	2002 VP_{50}	—	November 6, 2002	Anderson Mesa	LONEOS	·	3.0 km	MPC · JPL
176898	2002 VO_{51}	—	November 6, 2002	Anderson Mesa	LONEOS	·	2.4 km	MPC · JPL
176899	2002 VN_{53}	—	November 6, 2002	Socorro	LINEAR	·	1.9 km	MPC · JPL
176900	2002 VN_{57}	—	November 6, 2002	Haleakala	NEAT	·	1.9 km	MPC · JPL

== 176901–177000 ==
back to top

Designation			Discovery			Properties		Ref
Permanent	Provisional	Named after	Date	Site	Discoverer(s)	Category	Diam.	Ref
176901	2002 VQ_{61}	—	November 5, 2002	Socorro	LINEAR	·	3.9 km	MPC · JPL
176902	2002 VA_{65}	—	November 7, 2002	Socorro	LINEAR	·	2.4 km	MPC · JPL
176903	2002 VR_{66}	—	November 6, 2002	Socorro	LINEAR	·	1.2 km	MPC · JPL
176904	2002 VQ_{67}	—	November 7, 2002	Socorro	LINEAR	·	3.2 km	MPC · JPL
176905	2002 VD_{68}	—	November 7, 2002	Kitt Peak	Spacewatch	EUN	2.3 km	MPC · JPL
176906	2002 VA_{71}	—	November 7, 2002	Socorro	LINEAR	·	1.4 km	MPC · JPL
176907	2002 VL_{71}	—	November 7, 2002	Socorro	LINEAR	·	2.0 km	MPC · JPL
176908	2002 VJ_{77}	—	November 7, 2002	Socorro	LINEAR	·	2.6 km	MPC · JPL
176909	2002 VN_{78}	—	November 7, 2002	Socorro	LINEAR	·	2.0 km	MPC · JPL
176910	2002 VR_{78}	—	November 7, 2002	Socorro	LINEAR	·	2.5 km	MPC · JPL
176911	2002 VS_{80}	—	November 7, 2002	Socorro	LINEAR	·	2.7 km	MPC · JPL
176912	2002 VB_{83}	—	November 7, 2002	Socorro	LINEAR	·	2.7 km	MPC · JPL
176913	2002 VJ_{83}	—	November 7, 2002	Socorro	LINEAR	·	4.8 km	MPC · JPL
176914	2002 VN_{83}	—	November 7, 2002	Socorro	LINEAR	·	2.4 km	MPC · JPL
176915	2002 VW_{83}	—	November 7, 2002	Socorro	LINEAR	·	3.2 km	MPC · JPL
176916	2002 VU_{87}	—	November 8, 2002	Socorro	LINEAR	·	5.1 km	MPC · JPL
176917	2002 VP_{88}	—	November 11, 2002	Socorro	LINEAR	EUN	2.0 km	MPC · JPL
176918	2002 VJ_{93}	—	November 11, 2002	Socorro	LINEAR	·	1.7 km	MPC · JPL
176919	2002 VD_{105}	—	November 12, 2002	Socorro	LINEAR	(5)	2.1 km	MPC · JPL
176920	2002 VE_{106}	—	November 12, 2002	Socorro	LINEAR	·	1.8 km	MPC · JPL
176921	2002 VE_{107}	—	November 12, 2002	Socorro	LINEAR	·	1.9 km	MPC · JPL
176922	2002 VS_{108}	—	November 12, 2002	Socorro	LINEAR	·	2.9 km	MPC · JPL
176923	2002 VT_{109}	—	November 12, 2002	Socorro	LINEAR	·	3.1 km	MPC · JPL
176924	2002 VG_{113}	—	November 13, 2002	Palomar	NEAT	·	2.4 km	MPC · JPL
176925	2002 VS_{118}	—	November 12, 2002	Socorro	LINEAR	·	2.2 km	MPC · JPL
176926	2002 VA_{119}	—	November 12, 2002	Socorro	LINEAR	HNS	2.5 km	MPC · JPL
176927	2002 VS_{119}	—	November 12, 2002	Socorro	LINEAR	·	3.9 km	MPC · JPL
176928	2002 VK_{121}	—	November 12, 2002	Palomar	NEAT	EUN	2.7 km	MPC · JPL
176929	2002 VW_{121}	—	November 13, 2002	Palomar	NEAT	·	1.6 km	MPC · JPL
176930	2002 VL_{129}	—	November 5, 2002	Socorro	LINEAR	·	3.2 km	MPC · JPL
176931	2002 VM_{136}	—	November 12, 2002	Socorro	LINEAR	(5)	2.4 km	MPC · JPL
176932	2002 VC_{139}	—	November 13, 2002	Palomar	NEAT	·	2.5 km	MPC · JPL
176933	2002 WR_{1}	—	November 23, 2002	Palomar	NEAT	·	2.0 km	MPC · JPL
176934	2002 WW_{3}	—	November 24, 2002	Palomar	NEAT	·	2.3 km	MPC · JPL
176935	2002 WP_{5}	—	November 23, 2002	Palomar	NEAT	·	2.8 km	MPC · JPL
176936	2002 WA_{9}	—	November 24, 2002	Palomar	NEAT	·	4.5 km	MPC · JPL
176937	2002 WF_{9}	—	November 24, 2002	Palomar	NEAT	·	1.7 km	MPC · JPL
176938	2002 WD_{12}	—	November 27, 2002	Anderson Mesa	LONEOS	·	3.5 km	MPC · JPL
176939	2002 WH_{14}	—	November 28, 2002	Anderson Mesa	LONEOS	·	2.9 km	MPC · JPL
176940	2002 WY_{14}	—	November 28, 2002	Anderson Mesa	LONEOS	ADE	4.3 km	MPC · JPL
176941	2002 WF_{18}	—	November 30, 2002	Socorro	LINEAR	·	4.4 km	MPC · JPL
176942	2002 WZ_{19}	—	November 24, 2002	Palomar	S. F. Hönig	·	2.2 km	MPC · JPL
176943	2002 WQ_{21}	—	November 24, 2002	Palomar	NEAT	·	2.4 km	MPC · JPL
176944	2002 WW_{21}	—	November 23, 2002	Palomar	NEAT	·	2.3 km	MPC · JPL
176945	2002 XL_{2}	—	December 1, 2002	Socorro	LINEAR	(5)	1.5 km	MPC · JPL
176946	2002 XJ_{8}	—	December 2, 2002	Socorro	LINEAR	·	5.4 km	MPC · JPL
176947	2002 XR_{8}	—	December 2, 2002	Socorro	LINEAR	EOS	3.5 km	MPC · JPL
176948	2002 XM_{12}	—	December 3, 2002	Palomar	NEAT	·	3.2 km	MPC · JPL
176949	2002 XA_{18}	—	December 5, 2002	Socorro	LINEAR	·	3.6 km	MPC · JPL
176950	2002 XN_{21}	—	December 2, 2002	Socorro	LINEAR	(5)	2.2 km	MPC · JPL
176951	2002 XU_{21}	—	December 2, 2002	Socorro	LINEAR	DOR	5.2 km	MPC · JPL
176952	2002 XP_{28}	—	December 5, 2002	Socorro	LINEAR	NEM	3.3 km	MPC · JPL
176953	2002 XG_{33}	—	December 6, 2002	Palomar	NEAT	·	2.7 km	MPC · JPL
176954	2002 XK_{34}	—	December 5, 2002	Socorro	LINEAR	·	4.4 km	MPC · JPL
176955	2002 XR_{34}	—	December 6, 2002	Socorro	LINEAR	(5)	2.2 km	MPC · JPL
176956	2002 XZ_{34}	—	December 6, 2002	Socorro	LINEAR	·	2.7 km	MPC · JPL
176957	2002 XL_{38}	—	December 6, 2002	Socorro	LINEAR	·	2.8 km	MPC · JPL
176958	2002 XY_{41}	—	December 6, 2002	Socorro	LINEAR	·	2.6 km	MPC · JPL
176959	2002 XE_{44}	—	December 6, 2002	Socorro	LINEAR	·	3.6 km	MPC · JPL
176960	2002 XA_{45}	—	December 8, 2002	Palomar	NEAT	·	4.1 km	MPC · JPL
176961	2002 XZ_{47}	—	December 10, 2002	Socorro	LINEAR	·	3.6 km	MPC · JPL
176962	2002 XY_{48}	—	December 10, 2002	Socorro	LINEAR	·	2.4 km	MPC · JPL
176963	2002 XG_{53}	—	December 10, 2002	Socorro	LINEAR	·	3.4 km	MPC · JPL
176964	2002 XS_{53}	—	December 10, 2002	Palomar	NEAT	·	4.1 km	MPC · JPL
176965	2002 XN_{54}	—	December 10, 2002	Palomar	NEAT	·	3.4 km	MPC · JPL
176966	2002 XA_{55}	—	December 10, 2002	Palomar	NEAT	·	2.9 km	MPC · JPL
176967	2002 XB_{56}	—	December 8, 2002	Haleakala	NEAT	ADE	3.5 km	MPC · JPL
176968	2002 XO_{56}	—	December 10, 2002	Socorro	LINEAR	MAR	1.8 km	MPC · JPL
176969	2002 XS_{56}	—	December 10, 2002	Socorro	LINEAR	·	3.3 km	MPC · JPL
176970	2002 XK_{57}	—	December 10, 2002	Palomar	NEAT	·	4.8 km	MPC · JPL
176971	2002 XW_{61}	—	December 11, 2002	Socorro	LINEAR	·	3.0 km	MPC · JPL
176972	2002 XC_{62}	—	December 11, 2002	Socorro	LINEAR	·	2.4 km	MPC · JPL
176973	2002 XH_{63}	—	December 11, 2002	Socorro	LINEAR	·	3.7 km	MPC · JPL
176974	2002 XY_{63}	—	December 11, 2002	Socorro	LINEAR	·	3.5 km	MPC · JPL
176975	2002 XD_{70}	—	December 10, 2002	Palomar	NEAT	·	2.6 km	MPC · JPL
176976	2002 XX_{71}	—	December 11, 2002	Socorro	LINEAR	ADE	4.0 km	MPC · JPL
176977	2002 XH_{88}	—	December 12, 2002	Palomar	NEAT	·	1.6 km	MPC · JPL
176978	2002 XK_{89}	—	December 15, 2002	Haleakala	NEAT	·	2.9 km	MPC · JPL
176979	2002 XR_{101}	—	December 5, 2002	Socorro	LINEAR	·	2.6 km	MPC · JPL
176980	2002 XE_{102}	—	December 5, 2002	Socorro	LINEAR	·	2.7 km	MPC · JPL
176981 Anteradonić	2002 XJ_{116}	Anteradonić	December 11, 2002	Apache Point	SDSS	·	3.2 km	MPC · JPL
176982	2002 YK_{4}	—	December 29, 2002	Socorro	LINEAR	·	3.2 km	MPC · JPL
176983	2002 YS_{10}	—	December 31, 2002	Socorro	LINEAR	·	2.7 km	MPC · JPL
176984	2002 YC_{19}	—	December 31, 2002	Socorro	LINEAR	·	3.0 km	MPC · JPL
176985	2002 YV_{19}	—	December 31, 2002	Socorro	LINEAR	·	2.7 km	MPC · JPL
176986	2002 YP_{23}	—	December 31, 2002	Socorro	LINEAR	·	3.0 km	MPC · JPL
176987	2002 YQ_{27}	—	December 31, 2002	Socorro	LINEAR	·	6.4 km	MPC · JPL
176988	2002 YR_{29}	—	December 31, 2002	Socorro	LINEAR	·	4.9 km	MPC · JPL
176989	2003 AY_{4}	—	January 1, 2003	Needville	L. Castillo, W. G. Dillon	·	5.2 km	MPC · JPL
176990	2003 AD_{9}	—	January 4, 2003	Socorro	LINEAR	·	2.6 km	MPC · JPL
176991	2003 AY_{9}	—	January 1, 2003	Socorro	LINEAR	·	3.4 km	MPC · JPL
176992	2003 AC_{13}	—	January 1, 2003	Socorro	LINEAR	·	4.4 km	MPC · JPL
176993	2003 AE_{13}	—	January 1, 2003	Socorro	LINEAR	GEF	2.0 km	MPC · JPL
176994	2003 AK_{15}	—	January 4, 2003	Socorro	LINEAR	PHO	2.5 km	MPC · JPL
176995	2003 AZ_{15}	—	January 4, 2003	Socorro	LINEAR	EOS	3.5 km	MPC · JPL
176996	2003 AW_{16}	—	January 5, 2003	Tebbutt	F. B. Zoltowski	EUN	2.5 km	MPC · JPL
176997	2003 AK_{30}	—	January 4, 2003	Socorro	LINEAR	·	2.8 km	MPC · JPL
176998	2003 AW_{30}	—	January 4, 2003	Socorro	LINEAR	·	4.6 km	MPC · JPL
176999	2003 AG_{36}	—	January 7, 2003	Socorro	LINEAR	·	4.3 km	MPC · JPL
177000	2003 AW_{39}	—	January 7, 2003	Socorro	LINEAR	·	6.5 km	MPC · JPL

back to top

== See also ==
- Meanings of minor-planet names: 176001–177000
