= Grabovac =

Grabovac may refer to:

== Places ==
- Grabovac, Osijek-Baranja County, a village in eastern Croatia
- Grabovac Banski, a village in central Croatia
- Grabovac, Split-Dalmatia County, a village near Šestanovac in southern Croatia
- Grabovac, Karlovac County, a village near Rakovica in central Croatia
- Stari Grabovac (Old Grabovac), a village near Novska, Croatia
- Grabovac (Knić), a village in Serbia
- Grabovac (Obrenovac), a village in Serbia
- Grabovac (Prokuplje), a village in Serbia
- Grabovac (Svilajnac), a village in Serbia
- Grabovac (Trstenik), a village in Serbia
- Grabovac (Čelinac), a village in Republika Srpska, Bosnia and Herzegovina
- Grabovac, Velika Kladuša, a village near Velika Kladuša in Bosnia and Herzegovina
- Grabovac, Bosnia and Herzegovina, a village near Ljubinje
- Grabovac Monastery, a Serbian Orthodox monastery
- Grabovac (Zvečan), a village in Kosovo

== People ==
- Grabovac (surname)

== See also ==
- Grabovci (disambiguation)
- Grabovica (disambiguation)
- Hrabovec (disambiguation), Slovak cognate
- Grabowiec (disambiguation), Polish cognate
