= Gornja Grabovica (disambiguation) =

Gornja Grabovica is a village in Valjevo, Serbia.

Gornja Grabovica may also refer to:

- Gornja Grabovica (Jablanica), a village in the Blidinje Nature Park, municipality of Jablanica, Herzegovina-Neretva Canton, Bosnia and Herzegovina

== See also ==
- Grabovica Gornja
- Grabovica (disambiguation)
- Grabovica River (disambiguation)
- Grabovac (disambiguation)
