= Grabovica =

Grabovica may refer to:

== Places in Bosnia and Herzegovina ==
- Grabovica, Doboj
- Grabovica, Kotor Varoš
- Grabovica, Nevesinje
- Grabovica, Olovo
- Grabovica, Tomislavgrad
- Grabovica, Vlasenica
- Grabovica, Zavidovići
- Grabovica, Žepče
- Grabovica Donja
- Grabovica Gornja

== Places in Croatia ==
- Grabovica, Croatia

== Places in Serbia ==
- Grabovica, Despotovac
- Grabovica, Gornji Milanovac
- Grabovica, Kladovo
- Grabovica, Sjenica

== See also ==
- Grabovica River (disambiguation)
- Grabovac (disambiguation)
- Gornja Grabovica
