= Grabovci =

Grabovci may refer to:

- Grabovci, Serbia, a village near Ruma
- Grabovci, Bosnia and Herzegovina, a village near Konjic
- Grabovci, Croatia, a village near Vodice
- Adem Grabovci (born 1960), Kosovan politician

== See also ==
- Grabovac
