= Srima =

- Village
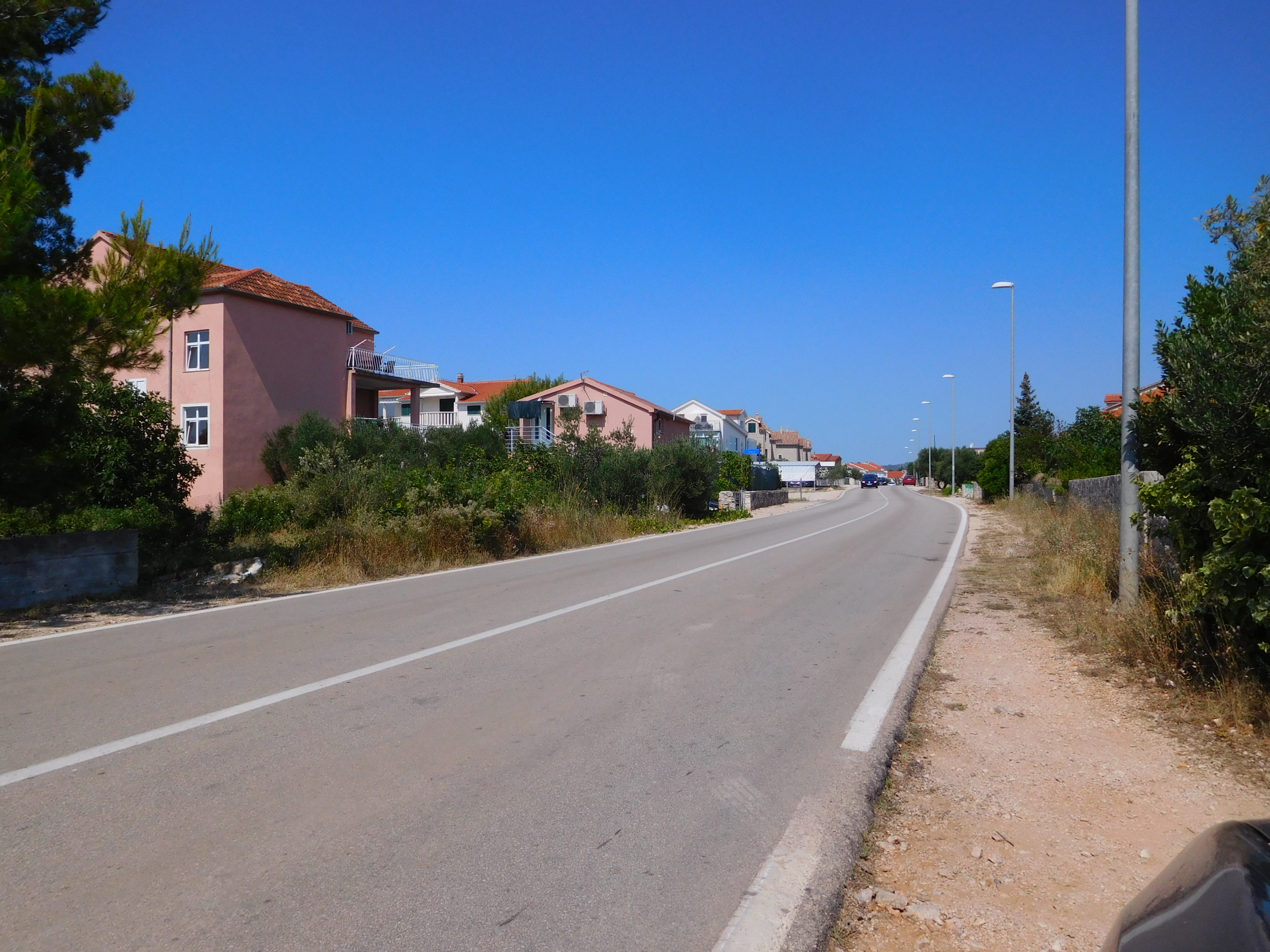
- Main street

- Location within Croatia
- Coordinates: 43°44′51″N 15°48′21″E
- Country: Croatia
- Region: Dalmatia
- County: Šibenik-Knin County

Area
  - Total: 10.9 km^{2} (4.2 sq mi)

Population (2021)
  - Total: 864
  - Density: 79.3/km^{2} (205/sq mi)
- Time zone: UTC+1 (CET)
  - Summer (DST): UTC+2 (CEST)

Srima is a village situated next to the south-eastern part of Vodice, Croatia.

== Photo gallery ==
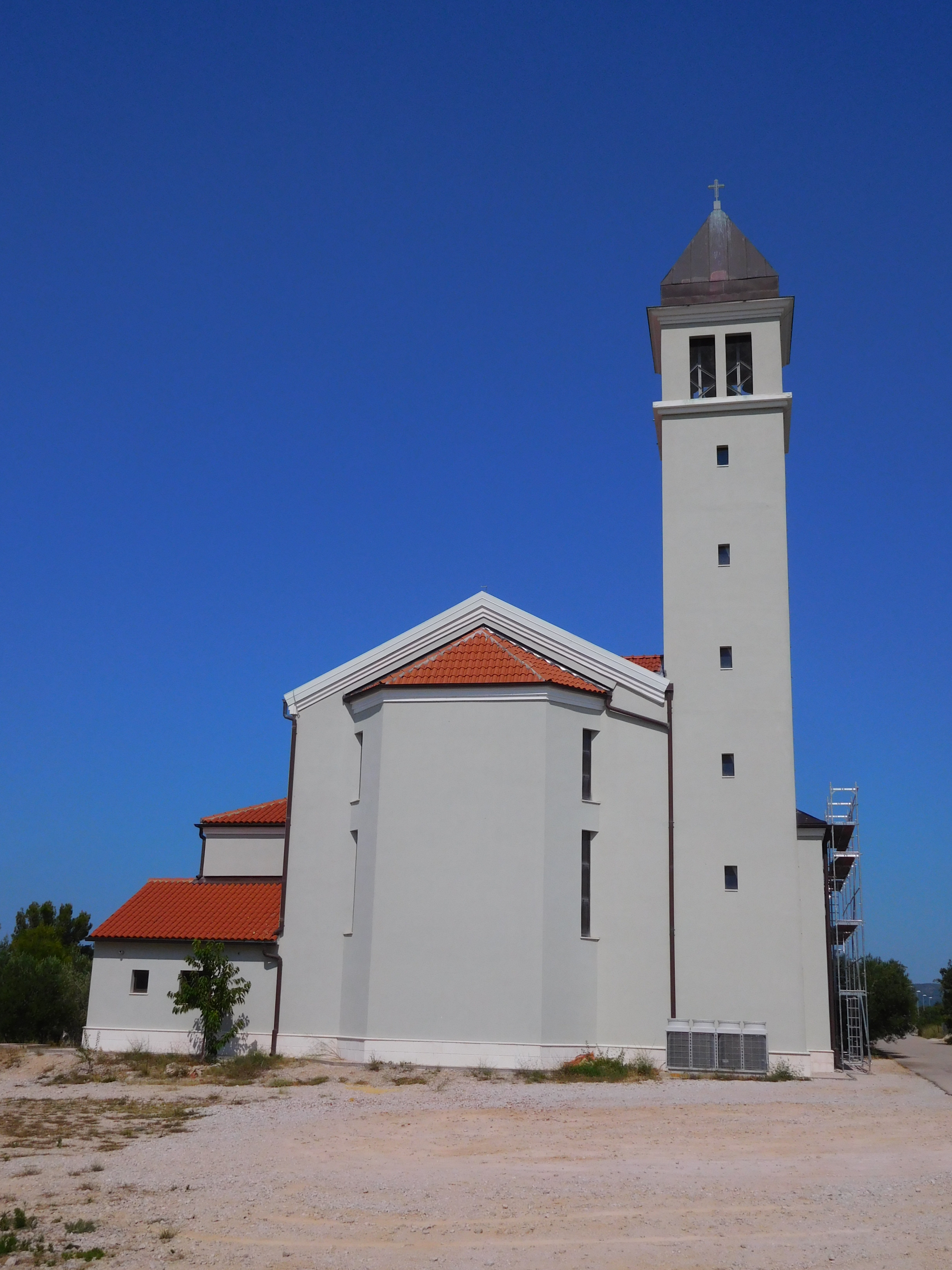
Church of Blessed Aloysius Stepinac

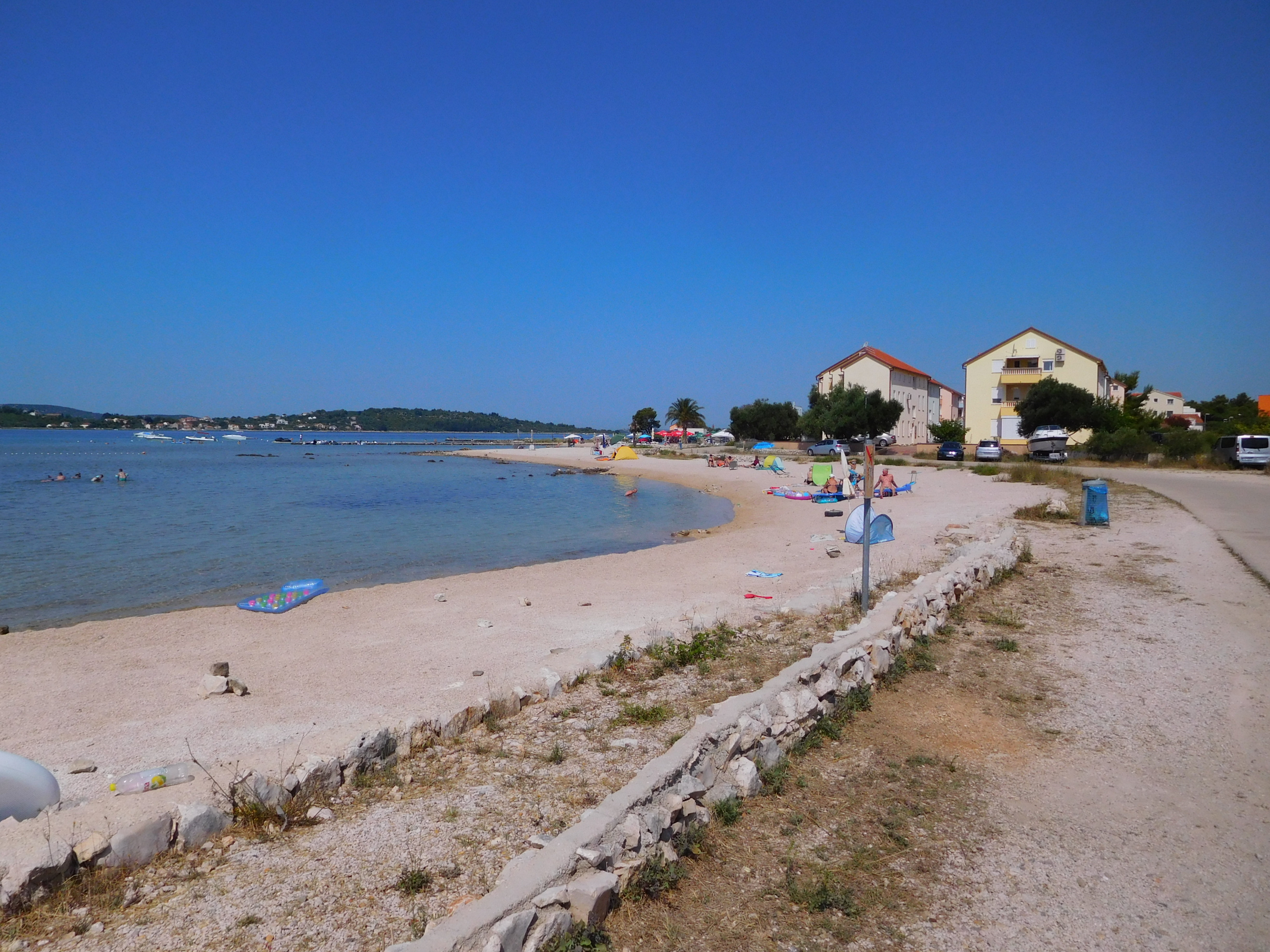
Beach on eastern end

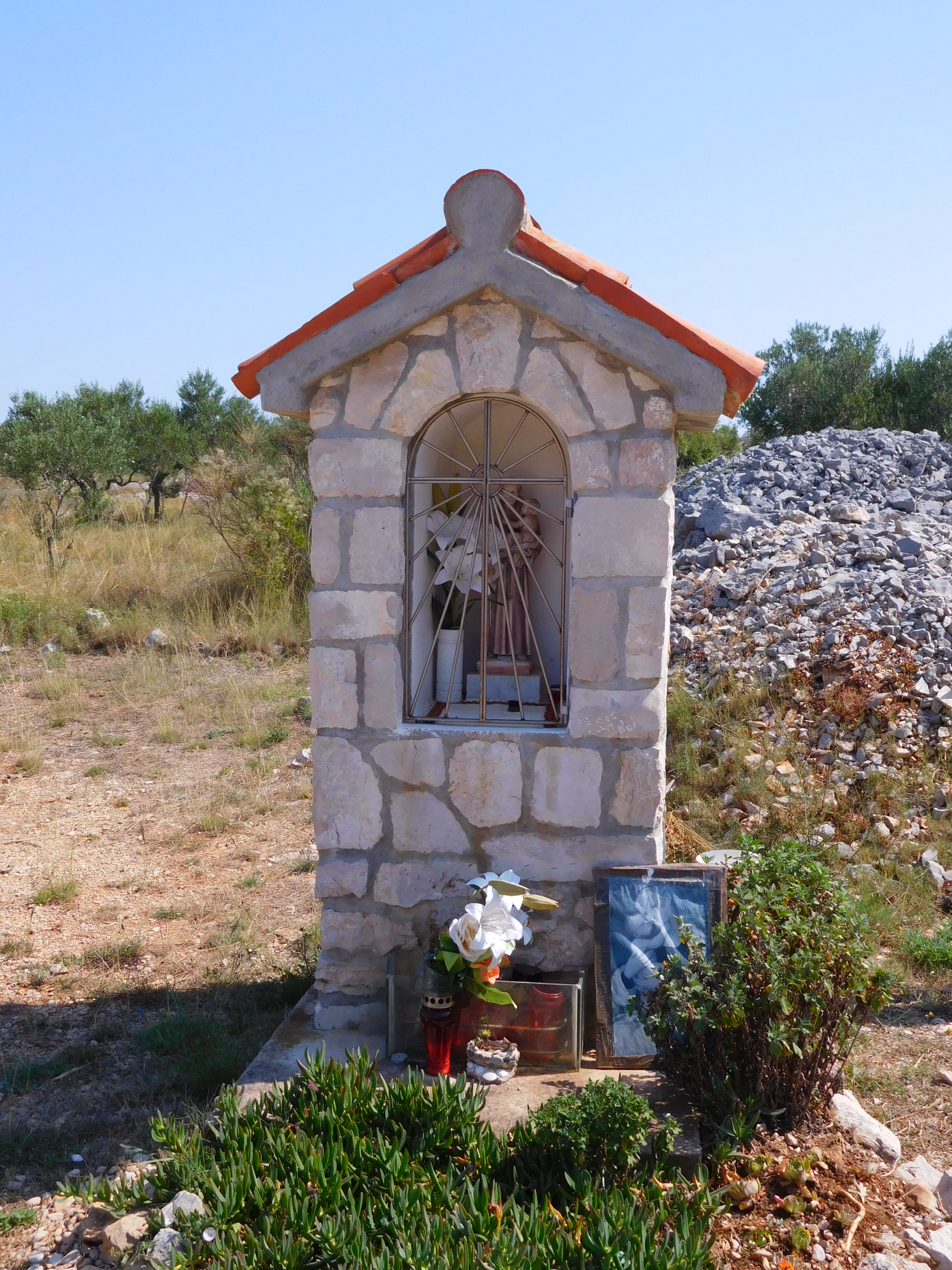
Wayside chapel
