= Čista Mala =

- Village
- Location of Čista Mala in Croatia
- Coordinates: 43°52′54″N 15°46′44″E
- Country: Croatia
- Region: AdriaticCroatia
- County: Šibenik-Knin
- Municipality: Vodice

Area
  - Total: 16.2 km^{2} (6.3 sq mi)
- Elevation: 112 m (367 ft)

Population (2021)
  - Total: 132
  - Density: 8.15/km^{2} (21.1/sq mi)
- Time zone: UTC+1 (CET)
  - Summer (DST): UTC+2 (CEST)
- Postal code: 22 223 Bribir
- Area code: (+385) 22

Čista Mala (Serbian Cyrillic: Чиста Мала) is a village in Croatia, in the municipality/town of Vodice, Šibenik-Knin County.

== Geography ==
Čista Mala is located in Ravni Kotari, c. 7 km from Skradin, and 10 km north of Vodice.

== History ==
The Serbian Orthodox church of St. Nicholas was built in 1873.

The settlement was previously part of the Šibenik municipality.

== Demographics ==
According to the 2011 census, the village of Čista Mala has 119 inhabitants. This represents 19.97% of its pre-war population according to the 1991 census.

The 1991 census recorded that 93.96% of the village population were ethnic Serbs (560/596), 0.67% were Yugoslavs (4/596), 4.03% were ethnic Croats (24/596), and 1.34% were of other ethnic origin (8/596).

=== Demographic history ===
- 2011 census: 119 inhabitants.
- 2001 census: 80 inhabitants.
- 1991 census: 596 inhabitants. 560 Serbs, 24 Croats, 4 Yugoslavs, 8 others and unknown.
- 1981 census: 577 inhabitants. 432 Serbs, 96 Yugoslavs, 19 Croats, 30 others and unknown.
Historical population 1857-2011
v

population	203	599	206	244	290	358	440	506	618	719	760	663	577	596	80	119
	1857	1869	1880	1890	1900	1910	1921	1931	1948	1953	1961	1971	1981	1991	2001	2011

Sources: Croatian Bureau of Statistics publications

== Anthropology ==
The native families (starosjedioci), all Orthodox by faith, were the: Berić, Vukojević, Vukša, Grulović, Dobrić, Lalić, Manojlović, Popović, Samardžić, Stjelja.
