= Grabovac (surname) =

Grabovac is a surname.

Notable bearers include:

- Filip Grabovac (1698–1749), Croatian priest
- Ivan Grabovac (born 1995), Croatian footballer
- Ivan Grabovac (footballer, born 1983), Croatian footballer
- Lorenz Grabovac (born 1997), Austrian footballer
- Mirko Grabovac (born 1971), Croatian-Singaporean football player
- Nikolina Grabovac (born 1968), Croatian basketball player

== See also ==
- Žarko Grabovač (born 1983), Serbian-Dutch football player
