= Gaćelezi =

Settlement in Šibenik-Knin County, Croatia

- Settlement
- Interactive map of Gaćelezi
- Location of Gaćelezi in Croatia
- Coordinates: 43°50′32″N 15°47′10″E
- Country: Croatia
- County: Šibenik-Knin
- City: Vodice

Area
  - Total: 9.7 km^{2} (3.7 sq mi)

Population (2021)
  - Total: 181
  - Density: 19/km^{2} (48/sq mi)
- Time zone: UTC+1 (CET)
  - Summer (DST): UTC+2 (CEST)
- Postal code: 22000 Šibenik
- Area code: +385 (0)22

Gaćelezi is a settlement in the City of Vodice in Croatia. In 2021, its population was 181.

== Demographics ==
Gaćelezi: Population trends 1857–2021
v

population	151		165	178	239	255	330	267	330	356	421	418	379	399	206	216	181
	1857	1869	1880	1890	1900	1910	1921	1931	1948	1953	1961	1971	1981	1991	2001	2011	2021

Sources: Croatian Bureau of Statistics publications
