= Vodice, Croatia =

Vodice
- Town
- Grad Vodice; Town of Vodice
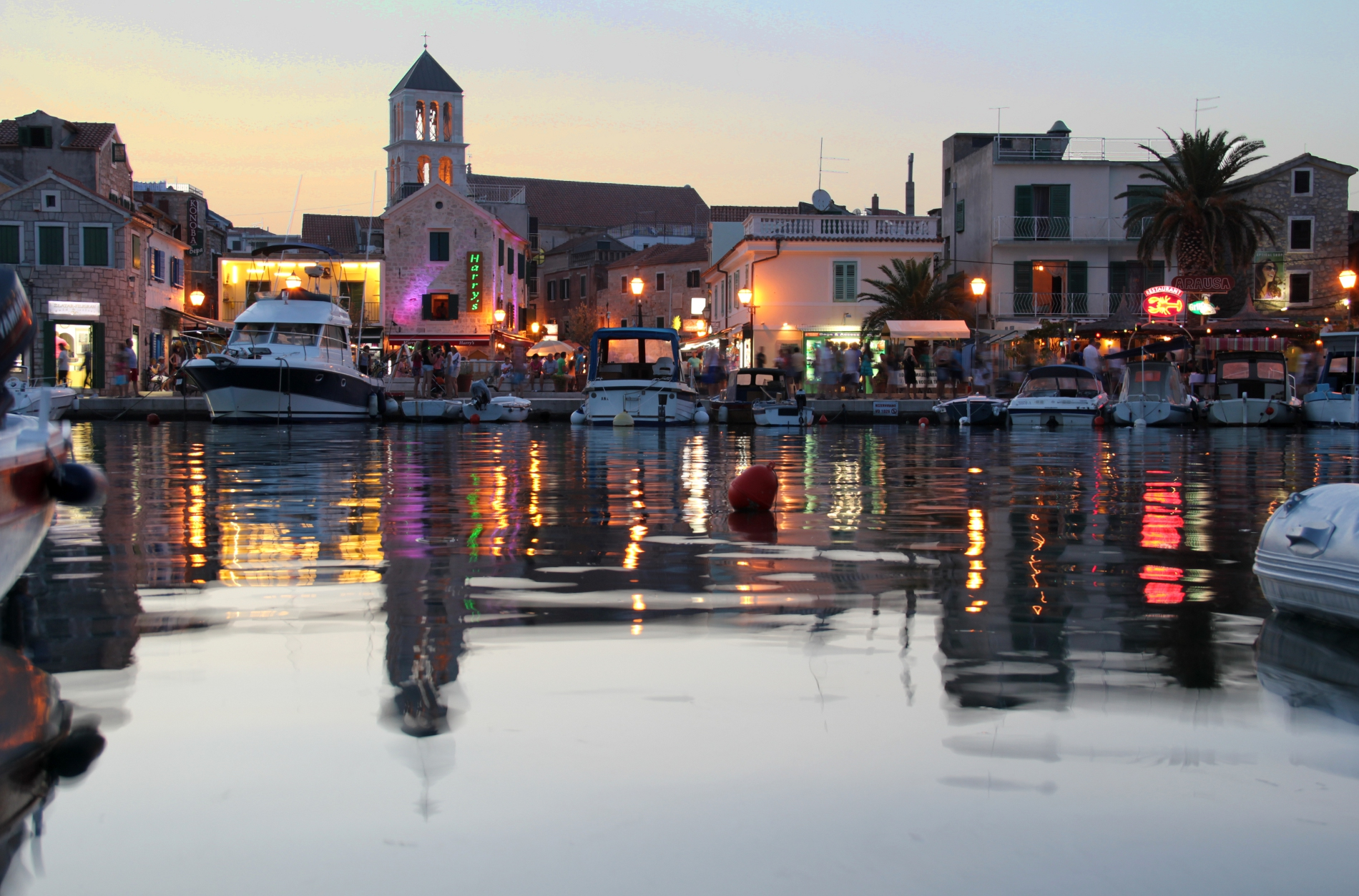

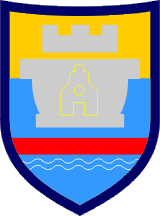
- Coat of arms

- Location within Croatia
- Coordinates: 43°45′N 15°46′E
- Country: Croatia
- Region: Dalmatia
- County: Šibenik-Knin County

Government
  - Type: Mayor-council
  - Mayor: Ante Cukrov (HDZ)

Area
  - Town: 92.7 km^{2} (35.8 sq mi)
  - Urban: 34.7 km^{2} (13.4 sq mi)

Population (2021)
  - Town: 8,649
  - Density: 93.3/km^{2} (242/sq mi)
  - Urban: 6,592
  - Urban density: 190/km^{2} (492/sq mi)
- Time zone: UTC+1 (CET)
  - Summer (DST): UTC+2 (CEST)
- Website: grad-vodice.hr

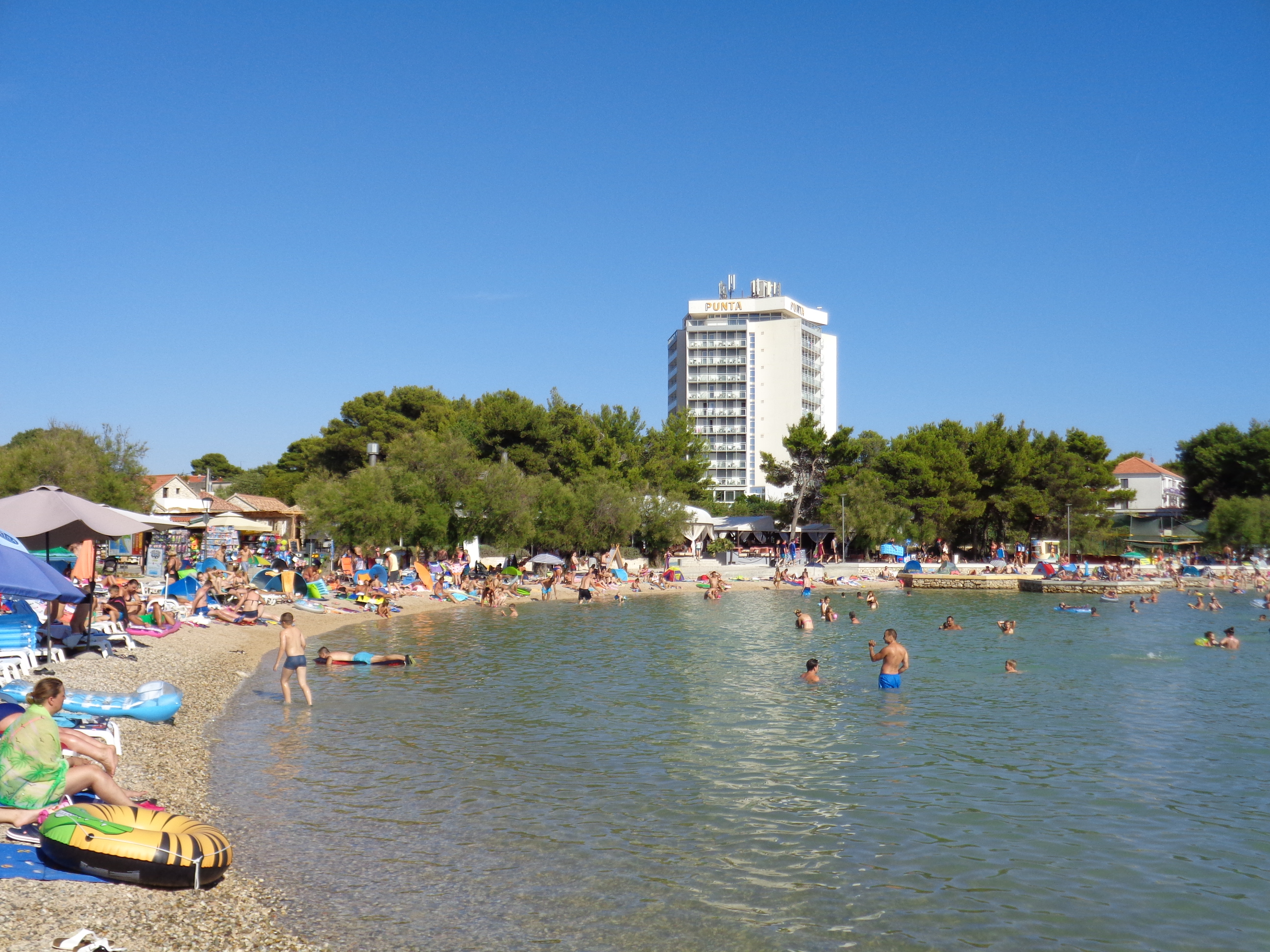
The Blue Beach

Vodice (Croatian pronunciation: [ʋɔ̌ditsɛ], lit. in Croatian 'small waters') is a resort town in the Šibenik-Knin County, Croatia. It borders the Adriatic Sea and has a population of 8,649 (2021 census).

Former village transformed in the second half of the 20th century into tourist destination, with peak popularity during the 2000s, when it was regularly among the most visited Dalmatian destinations.

== Geography ==
Vodice is located in a wide bay, 11 km northwest from Šibenik, 85 km from Split, and 62 km southeast from Zadar. It is close to the highways M2, E65, and A1. Zadar Airport is 48 km and Split Airport 60 km away.

== History ==
=== Turkish invasion and plague ===
Ne čudim se Šibeniku gradu jer je ono sokol na krajini,
već Vodican selu ukraj mora, kako se je Turkon obranilo,
bez ikakove moći i pomoći, bez galija i bez lumbarada.
(I marvel not at the town of Šibenik, for it is a hawk,
but I marvel at Vodice, a village by the sea, that defended itself against the Turks,
without the power and help of galleys and weapons.)

=== Modern period ===
In 1891 Vodice separated from Tisno municipality and became an independent municipality (obćina), encompassing Pišća, Okit, Rakitnica, Dražice, Tribunj, Stajice and Vrbice. In the mid-19th century there were 1500, and in the early 20th century 2500 inhabitants.

With the establishment of the independent Republic of Croatia in the 1990, Vodice acquired city status.

On August 30, 2007, twelve firefighters died in attempts to localise and stop eruptive fire on the island of Kornat. Five of them were members of Voluntary firefighters society Vodice (DVD Vodice), others were from Šibenik and Tisno. This tragedy is known as "Kornat tragedy" (Kornatska tragedija).

== Population ==
Town of Vodice: Population trends 1857–2021
v

population	4063	3607	5215	5960	7318	7836	8570	7974	7357	7779	7503	7395	7691	8867	9407	8875	8649
	1857	1869	1880	1890	1900	1910	1921	1931	1948	1953	1961	1971	1981	1991	2001	2011	2021

Sources: Croatian Bureau of Statistics publications

Urban population more than doubled between 1948 and 2011. Population density is higher than 100 people/km^{2}.

In 2011, approximate age of residents was 43,1. There were 20,6% of young (0–19 years) and 28,1% of old people (60+ yrs).

In the 2021 census, the municipality consisted of the following settlements:

- Čista Mala, population 132
- Čista Velika, population 405
- Gaćelezi, population 181
- Grabovci, population 75
- Prvić Luka, population 148
- Prvić Šepurine, population 252
- Srima, population 864
- Vodice, population 6,592

== Economy ==
Thanks to favourable position and richness in springs of drinking water (Vodice meaning 'waters'), Vodice became intersection of trade routes, atracting tradesmen, seamen, fishermen, peasants, armies and travellers, especially with area being venue of fairs (on which locals sold and traded cattle and field crops, while islanders offered fresh or processed fish), even before the first mention of the name Vodice. Furthermore, until the 19th century Vodice were known for the export of the drinking water, while the wells (bunari) built for this purpose become gathering places of people and centers of social events.

== History of the Vodice fields ==
Several kilometers north of Vodice there are two fields, Rakitnica and Gradelji/Pišća: Rakitnica has an old fort named Gradina on the hill and down the hill it has three wells and a pond, recently a Roman terracotta masonry has been excavated there. This field is most known for the small church of Saint John, damages from the Patriotic 1991-95 war can be sen, the grassland near it is known for having 1 May celebrations every year. Gradelji/Pišća has old walls on the top of the hill, an old Roman Cistern, the small church of Saint Eliah, and a small ruined house from the 17/18th century.

== Religion ==
At the request of the manager of the church of the Holy Cross, priest Ante Hlapčić, and by the decision of the episcopal vicar Juraj Šižgorić, on 13 May 1484 Vodice became a chaplaincy, and in 1564 parish to which the settlements Kamene, Okit and Pišća join. Faced with the danger from the Ottomams, the population from the mentioned villages in 1571 fled to Vodice. In 1572, the Turks occupied Rakitnica, which thus ceases to be a parish and joins the parish of Vodice. Namely, Rakitnica, which was first mentioned in history in 1311 and ecclesiastically, it first belonged to the Diocese of Skradin, in 1445 becomes a parish, and after the Turks conquered Skradin, it fell under the administration of the Šibenik diocese.

Vodice deanery comprises following parishes: Vodice, Tribunj, Zlarin, Prvić Luka, Prvić Šepurine, Žirje and Kaprije.

=== Parish church of the Holy Cross ===
The church was built on the substruction of the earlier, smaller church in 1662, by Vicko Ivanov from Korčula island. Its construction continued all the way to 18th century. Master builder from Šibenik Ivan Skoko, worked in 1725 on the chapel and the main altar, which were later embedded into the apse of the church. From 1746 to 1749 church was broadened to its present form, getting facade with Baroque portal and rosette, as well as side walls with Baroque oval windows. Under the rosette is inscription in stone board in Latin about dedication of the church to the Holy Cross:

INCARNATO DEI FILIO/ IN CRVIS VEXILLO TRIVMPHANTI/ OB PERRPETVAM AMORIS SYNGRAPHAM/ PRIMORES POPVLVSOVE VODICIIARUM/ HOC TEMPLUM OPLYMPIADE VNA/ FVNDITVS EXTRVXERUNT/ ANO DOMINI MDCCXLIX

In translation:

To the incarnate Son of God who is triumphant on the flag of the cross, as a bond of eternal love. Honorables and folk of Vodice have rebuilt from foundation this temple during one Olympiad [4 years] in the year of out Lord 1749.

Church was consecrated on 26 May 1769 by Šibenik bishop Jerolim Bonačić.

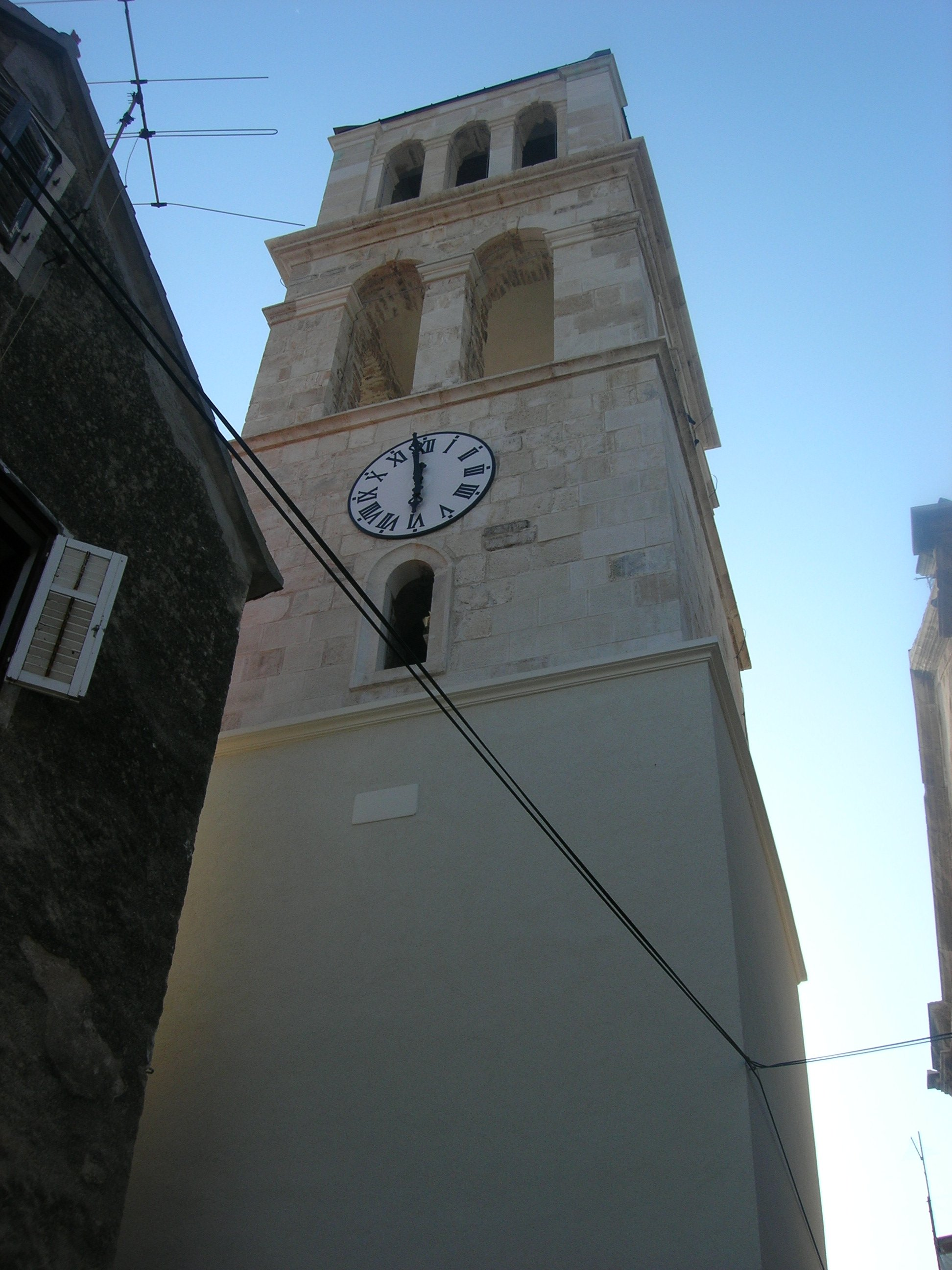
Bell tower of the Catholic parish church.

It is single-nave shape church, built in Dalmatian Baroque style, with 27 m length, 11 m width and 11 m height. The bell tower was built between 1752 and 1772 by master Vicko Macanović Raguseo and it is structured with closed shaft and two belfries, with lower one having two, and upper belfry three smaller windows, ending with a pyramidal roof. There are three bells. One of them was made by Petar Bazo in Venice, weighing 852 Viennese pounds, and consercrated and dedicated to Saint Joseph by bishop Ivan Berčić on 24 April 1853. Bells were electricified in 2006.

The baroque main altar made of black and white marble is dedicated to the Holy Cross. To the right is the altar of Our Lady of Carmel (Gospa Karmelska), and to the left the altar of the Most Sacred Heart of Jesus. On the right side wall is the altar of Saint Anthony of Padua and on the left side wall the altar of the Holy Family. On the altars of the Sacred Heart and the Holy Family there are altarpieces made by Eugenio Moretti Larese. On the ceiling of the church nave is a painting representing The Holy Trinity, coronation of the Blessed Virgin Mary and Saint Helen with a cross in her hand. Four corners of the painting depict four evangelists with their symbols (tetramorph). In the right niche is statue of Our Lady Help of Christians and on the left one Our Lady of the Rosary.

== Culture and events ==
=== Music ===
First music group in Vodice, Fanfara, was founded in 1911, and was a predecessor of today Vodice City Music brass band.

During summer months, every Wednesday concerts of klapa singers are being held, known as "Wednesday klapa evenings" (Croatian: Klapske večeri srijedom). Local female Klapa Oršulice was founded in 2001 and male Klapa Bunari in 2004.

=== Librarianship ===
Beginnings of public libraries in Vodice date back to the 19th century and Croatian National Reviwal in Dalmatia. Flrst public library, Croatian library (Croatian: Hrvatska čitaonica), was founded in 1886. Library was gathering place of members of Croatian Republican Peasant Party in the 1920s. Local teacher Pave Roca started publishing of first Vodice's newspaper Razkovani (1921–22). During the World War II, cultural activity in town was diminished. Library was active in the next few post-war years until closing at the beginning of the 1950s. Following the end of the Croatian War of Independence, Public Library of the Municipality of Vodice (Croatian: Pučka knjižnica i čitaonica Općine Vodice) was re-established on 24 December 1995 and opened by Croatian writer Ivo Brešan. In 2013, library moved to then newly renovated old school building, built in 1911. In the meantime, library changed its name into Vodice Public Library (Vodice City Library, Croatian: Gradska knjižnica Vodice).

=== Events ===
The most famous feast in Vodice called "Vodička fešta" is held annually on 4 August. Well-known festival of Croatian pop music called "CMC festival" is held every year in June, featuring the most famous singers of Croatian pop music.

Vodice is also known for congressional tourism, with many scientific conferences and events being held here.

== Notable residents ==
- Ivo Brešan, Croatian playwright
- Dalibor Cvitan (hr), Croatian writer and literary critic
- Ive Čaće (hr), Croatian writer and painter
- Ante Ivas, Croatian Catholic prelate
- Tomislav Ivišić, basketball player currently with the University of Illinois, Zvonimir's twin brother
- Zvonimir Ivišić, basketball player currently with the University of Illinois, Tomislav's twin brother
- Šime Strikoman (hr), Croatian photographer

== Image gallery ==
Buildings

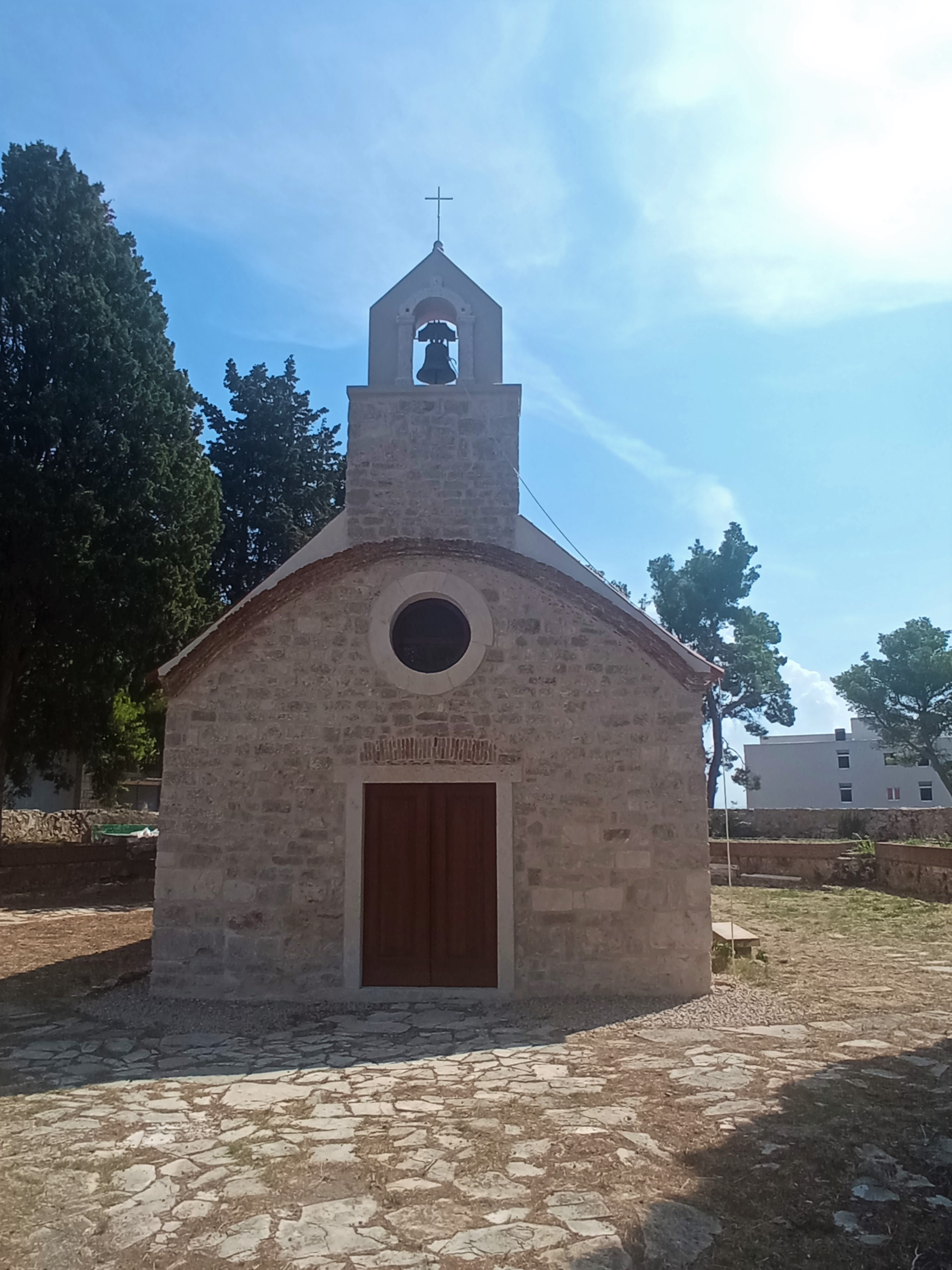
Church of St. Cross, consecrated in 15th century.

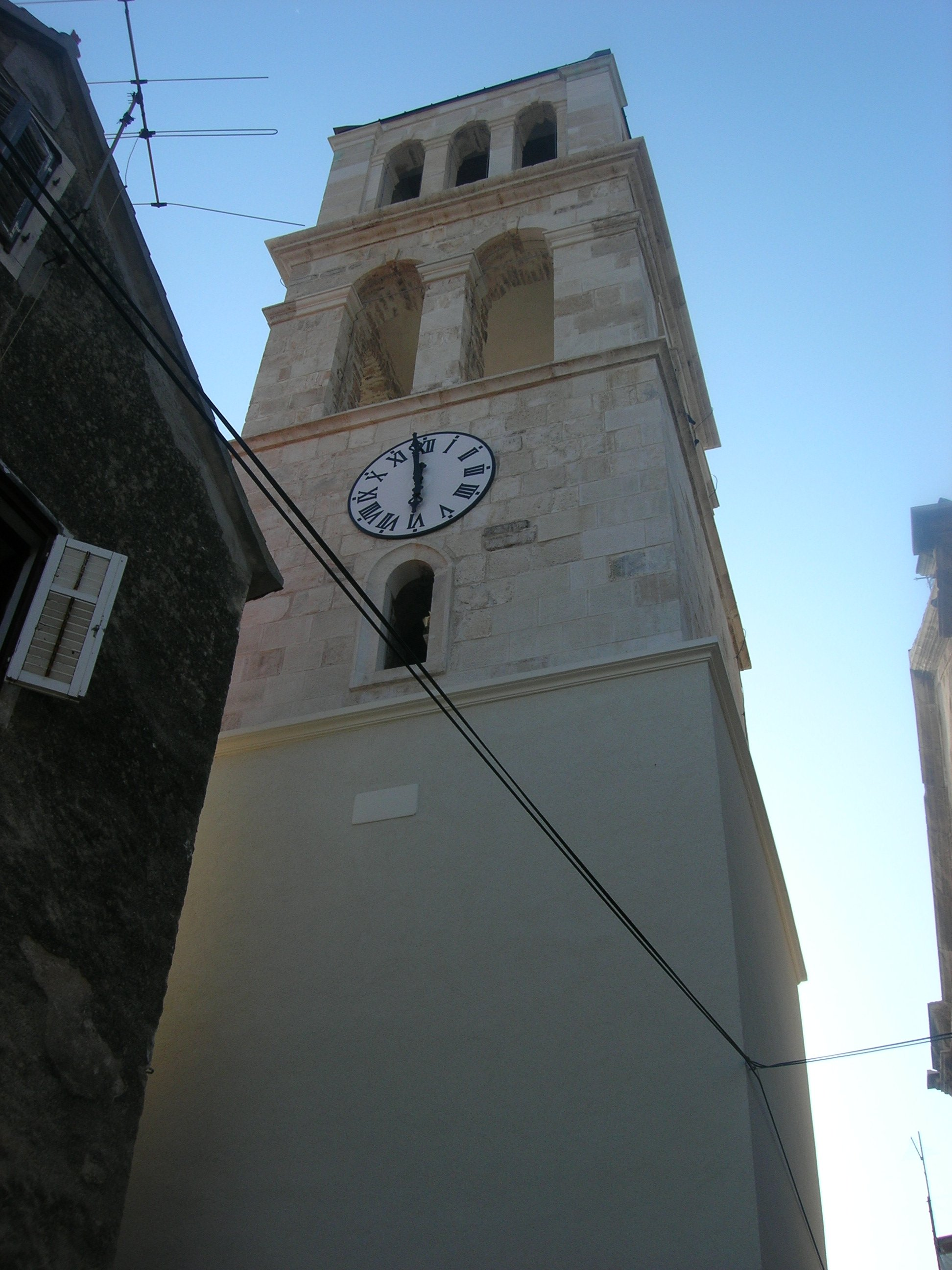
Bell tower or Catholic parish church.

Coast

Hexagon beach at the Punta peninsula.

View of Prvić from Vodice coast.

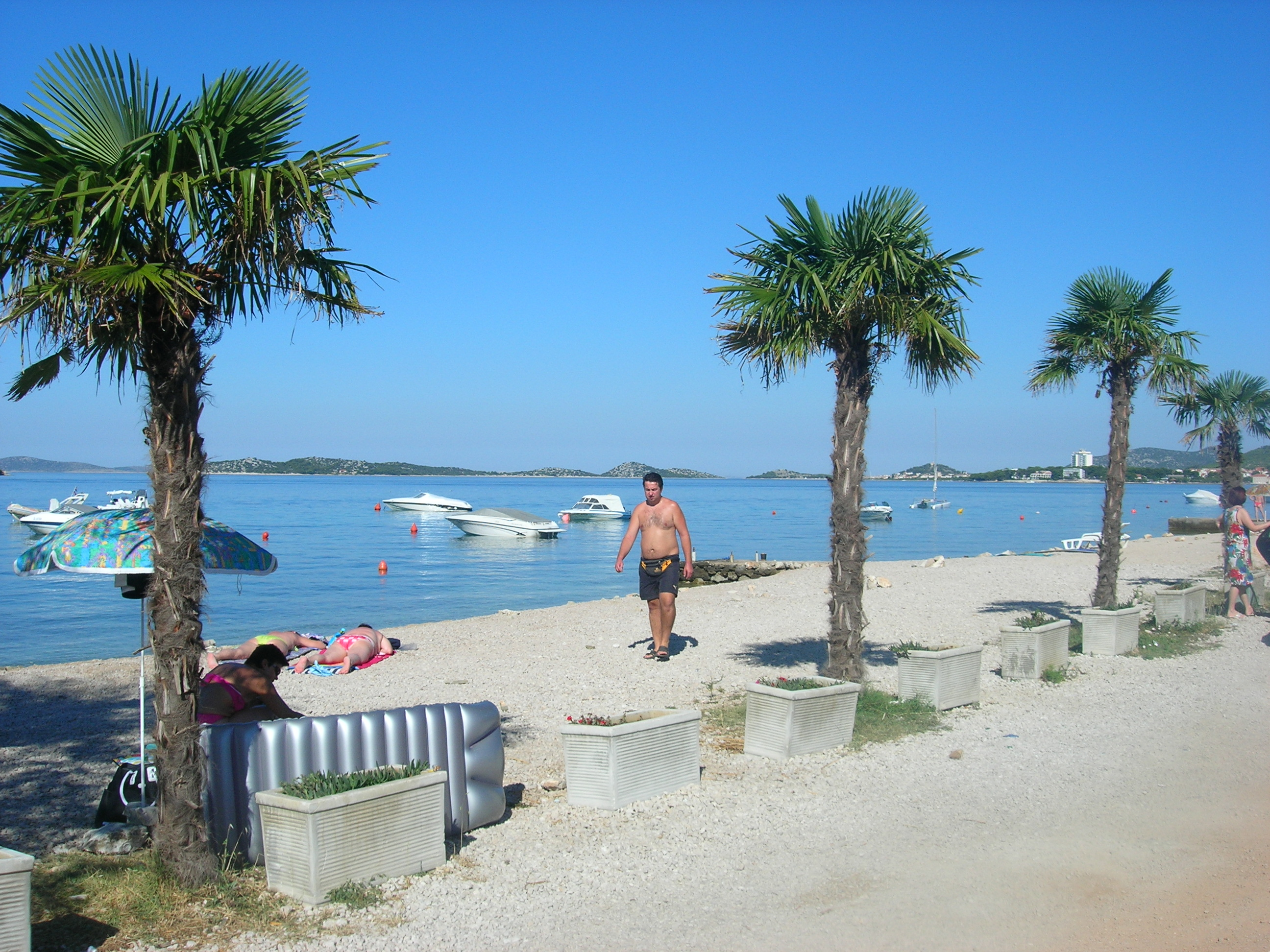
"Hangari" beach.

Monuments

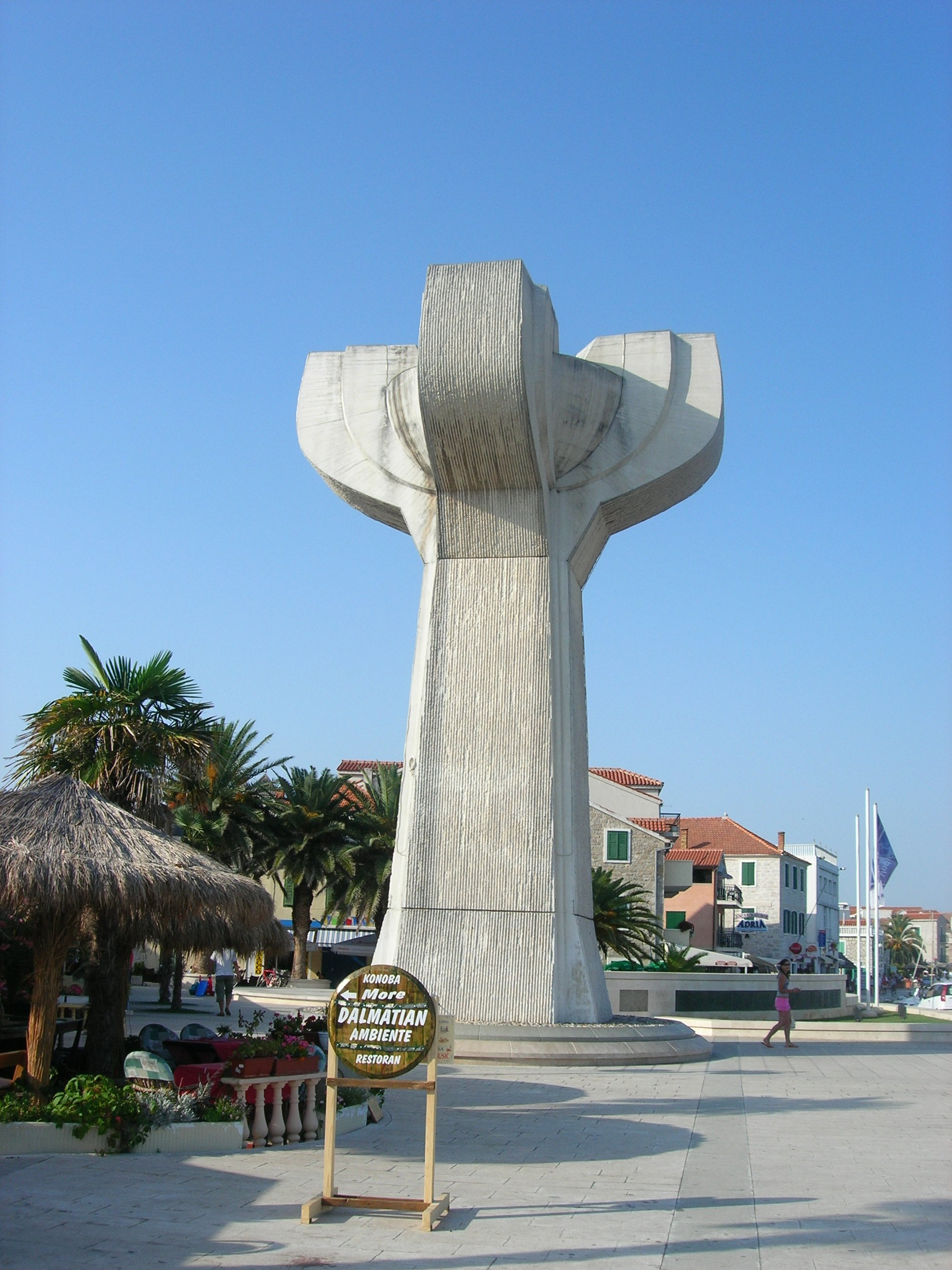
Monument to the Fallen Soldiers of WWII from Vodice was erected in 1965.

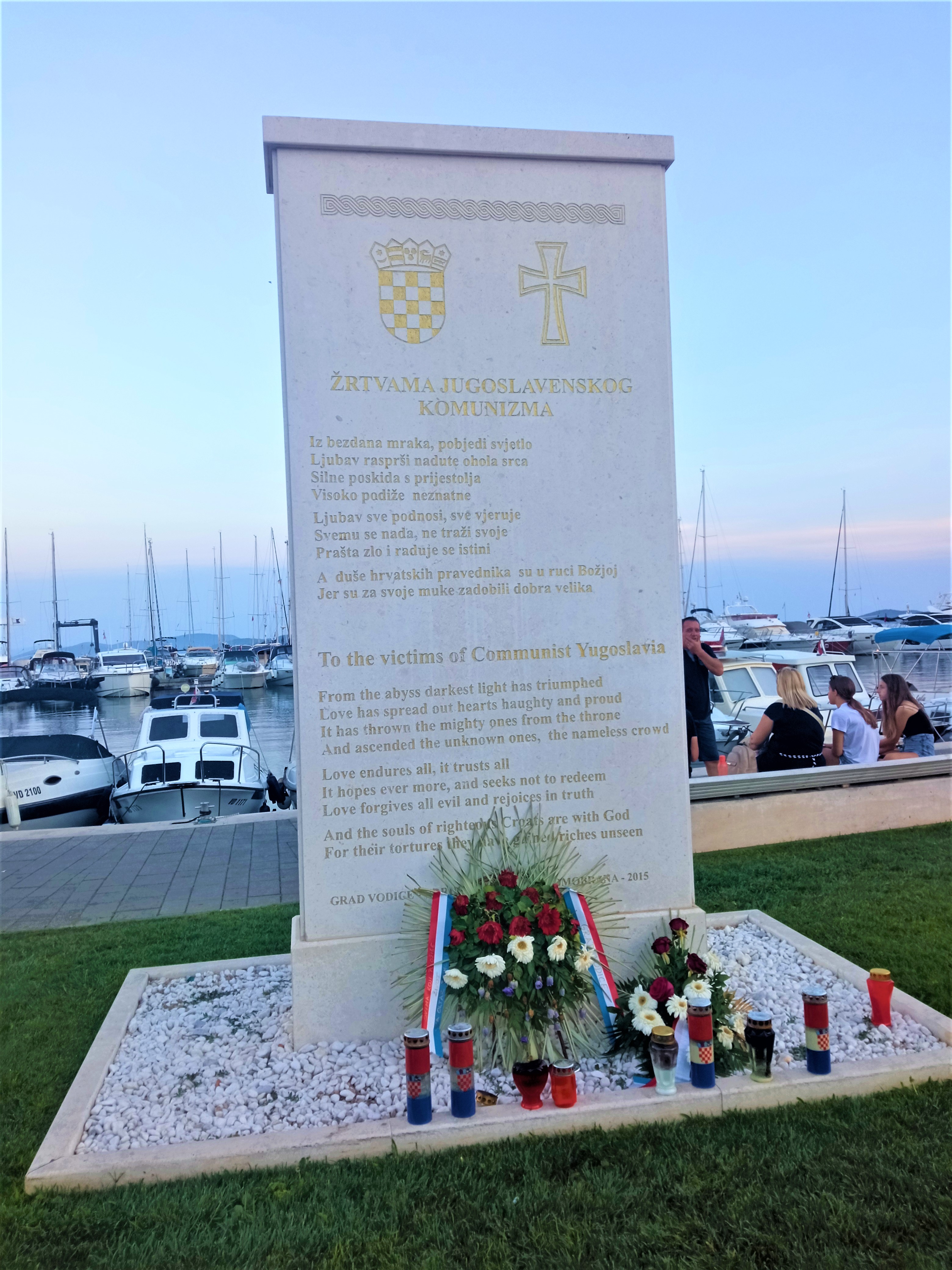
Monument to the victims of Yugoslav Communism. It is place of commemoration every August 23rd.

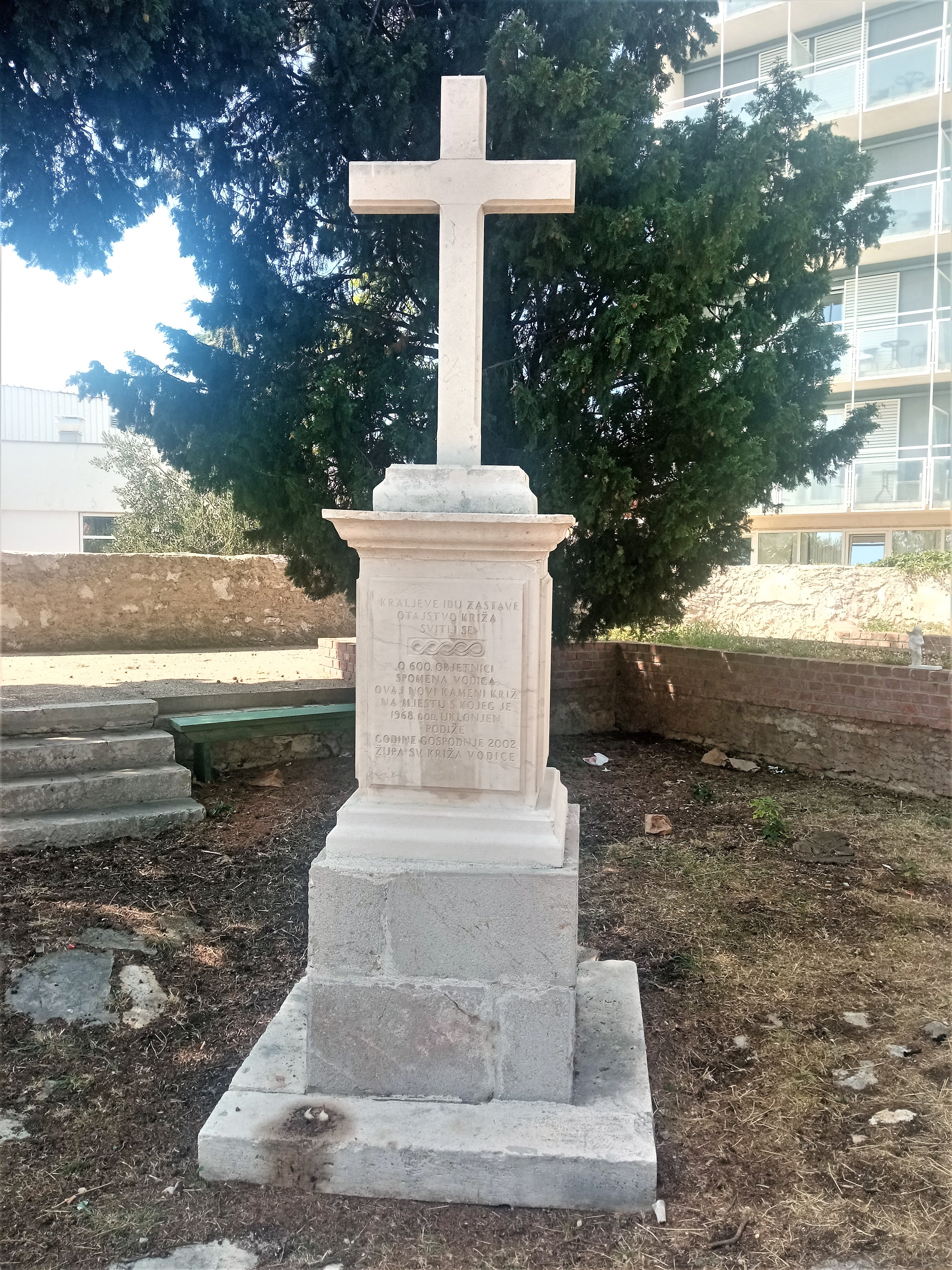
Cross erected in memoriam to 600 years of first mention of Vodice, in 2002.

== See also ==
- Šibenik
- Island Prvić
- Kornati National Park
- Krka National Park
- Adriatic Boat Show

== Literature ==
- Nimac, Dragan; Primorac, Jakša; Ćaleta, Joško; Šimat, Frane; Pavlović, Klara, ed. (2007). Pjevana baština: pučko crkveno pjevanje u Šibenskoj biskupiji, Vodice - Župa Našašća Svetoga Križa [A heritage of song: Liturgical music in the Diocese of Šibenik, Parish of the Holy Cross in Vodice] (PDF) (in Croatian and English). Šibenik: Hrvatska kulturna udruga Pjevana baptina. ISBN 978-953-7528-00-3.
- Lučev, Toni (2021). GIS analiza promjena u prostornom rasporedu stanovništva Šibensko-kninske županije od 1948. do 2011. godine [GIS analysis of changes in the spatial distribution of the population of the Šibenik - Knin County from 1948 to 2011] (Thesis) (in Croatian). University of Zagreb, Faculty of Science.
