= Čista Velika =

Settlement in Šibenik-Knin County, Croatia

- Settlement
- Interactive map of Čista Velika
- Location of Čista Velika in Croatia
- Coordinates: 43°53′43″N 15°45′57″E
- Country: Croatia
- County: Šibenik-Knin
- City: Vodice

Area
  - Total: 7.1 km^{2} (2.7 sq mi)

Population (2021)
  - Total: 405
  - Density: 57/km^{2} (150/sq mi)
- Time zone: UTC+1 (CET)
  - Summer (DST): UTC+2 (CEST)
- Postal code: 22213 Pirovac
- Area code: +385 (0)22

Čista Velika is a settlement in the City of Vodice in Croatia. In 2021, its population was 405.

== Demographics ==
Čista Velika: Population trends 1857–2021
v

population	132		160	183	222	241	275	299	413	461	536	521	540	533	487	472	405
	1857	1869	1880	1890	1900	1910	1921	1931	1948	1953	1961	1971	1981	1991	2001	2011	2021

Sources: Croatian Bureau of Statistics publications
