= Grabowiec =

Grabowiec or Grabówiec may refer to:

In Greater Poland Voivodeship (west-central Poland):

- Grabowiec, Szamotuły County
- Grabowiec, Turek County
- Grabówiec, Greater Poland Voivodeship

In Kuyavian-Pomeranian Voivodeship (north-central Poland):

- Grabowiec, Grudziądz County
- Grabowiec, Toruń County
- Grabówiec, Brodnica County
- Grabówiec, Lipno County

In Łódź Voivodeship (central Poland):

- Grabowiec, Piotrków County
- Grabowiec, Sieradz County

In Lublin Voivodeship (east Poland):

- Grabowiec, Gmina Łaziska, Opole County
- Grabowiec, Radzyń County
- Grabowiec, Zamość County

In Masovian Voivodeship (east-central Poland):

- Grabowiec, Lipsko County
- Grabowiec, Płock County
- Grabowiec, Siedlce County
- Grabowiec, Węgrów County
- Grabówiec, Ciechanów County
- Grabówiec, Pułtusk County
- Grabówiec, Sierpc County

In Podlaskie Voivodeship (north-east Poland):

- Grabowiec, Bielsk County
- Grabowiec, Hajnówka County
- Grabowiec, Siemiatycze County

In Pomeranian Voivodeship (north Poland):

- Grabowiec, Człuchów County
- Grabowiec, Gmina Bobowo
- Grabowiec, Gmina Osiek
- Grabowiec, Gmina Smętowo Graniczne
- Grabowiec, Wejherowo County
- Grabowiec, Braniewo County
- Grabowiec, Iława County

In other voivodeships:

- Grabowiec, Lubusz Voivodeship (west Poland)
- Grabowiec, Subcarpathian Voivodeship (south-east Poland)
- Grabowiec, Świętokrzyskie Voivodeship (south-central Poland)
- Grabowiec, West Pomeranian Voivodeship (north-west Poland)
- Hrabovets, Ivano-Frankivsk Oblast
