= Grabovac, Velika Kladuša =

Grabovac
- Village
- Location within Bosnia and Herzegovina
- Coordinates: 45.175916°N 15.958208°E
- Country: Bosnia and Herzegovina
- Entity: Federation of Bosnia and Herzegovina
- Canton: Una-Sana
- Municipality: Velika Kladuša

Area
  - Total: 2.05 sq mi (5.30 km^{2})

Population (2013)
  - Total: 618
  - Density: 302/sq mi (117/km^{2})
- Time zone: UTC+1 (CET)
  - Summer (DST): UTC+2 (CEST)

Grabovac is a village in the municipality of Velika Kladuša, Bosnia and Herzegovina.

== Demographics ==
According to the 2013 census, its population was 618.

Ethnicity in 2013
Ethnicity	Number	Percentage
Bosniaks	549	88.8%
Croats	4	0.6%
other/undeclared	65	10.5%
Total	618	100%
