= Ivan Grabovac =

Croatian footballer

Personal information
- Date of birth: 8 March 1995 (age 31)
- Place of birth: Zagreb, Croatia
- Height: 1.90 m (6 ft 3 in)
- Position: Centre back

Team information
- Current team: SV Flavia Solva
- Number: 17

Youth career
- –2007: Hrvatski Dragovoljac
- 2007–2009: Zagreb
- 2009–2013: Hrvatski Dragovoljac

Senior career*
Years	Team	Apps	(Gls)
2013–2015	Inter Zaprešič	32	(0)
2015–2016	Rudeš	11	(0)
2016	Segesta	3	(0)
2016–2017	Hrvatski Dragovoljac	3	(0)
2017	Stupnik		
2017–2018	Kapfenberger SV	15	(0)
2019	ASK Köflach	19	(5)
2020	TUS Heiligenkreuz	11	(0)
2021–	Flavia Solva	23	(8)

International career
2013–2014	Croatia U19	5	(0)
2015	Croatia U20	2	(0)
- * Club domestic league appearances and goals as of 26 July 2022

Ivan Grabovac (born 8 March 1995) is a Croatian football player, who currently plays for Austrian lower league side SV Flavia Solva.

== Club career ==
He made his Austrian Football First League debut for Kapfenberger SV on 15 August 2017 in a game against SC Wiener Neustadt.

On 29 January 2019, Grabovac joined ASK Mochart Köflach. He left the club at the end of the year and joined TUS Heiligenkreuz am Waasen.
