= Grabovac (Prokuplje) =

Grabovac Грабовац (Serbian)
- Village
- Location within Serbia
- Coordinates: 43°10′23″N 21°24′17″E
- Country: Serbia
- District: Toplica District
- Municipality: Prokuplje

Population (2002)
  - Total: 14
- Time zone: UTC+1 (CET)
  - Summer (DST): UTC+2 (CEST)

Grabovac is a village in the municipality of Prokuplje, Serbia. According to the 2002 census, the village has a population of 14 people.
