= Grabovica Donja =

- Village
- Location within Bosnia and Herzegovina
- Coordinates: 44.5509973°N 18.7094163°E
- Country: Bosnia and Herzegovina
- Entity: Federation of Bosnia and Herzegovina
- Canton: Tuzla
- Municipality: Tuzla

Area
  - Total: 1.34 sq mi (3.47 km^{2})

Population (2013)
  - Total: 1,054
  - Density: 787/sq mi (304/km^{2})
- Time zone: UTC+1 (CET)
  - Summer (DST): UTC+2 (CEST)

Grabovica Donja is a village in the municipality of Tuzla, Tuzla Canton, Bosnia and Herzegovina.

== Demographics ==
According to the 2013 census, its population was 1,054.

Ethnicity in 2013
Ethnicity	Number	Percentage
Bosniaks	867	82.3%
Croats	123	11.7%
Serbs	7	0.7%
other/undeclared	57	5.4%
Total	1,054	100%
