= Grabovci, Croatia =

Settlement in Šibenik-Knin County, Croatia

Grabovci
- Settlement
- Interactive map of Grabovci
- Location of Grabovci in Croatia
- Coordinates: 43°51′07″N 15°45′43″E
- Country: Croatia
- County: Šibenik-Knin
- City: Vodice

Area
  - Total: 5.2 km^{2} (2.0 sq mi)

Population (2021)
  - Total: 75
  - Density: 14/km^{2} (37/sq mi)
- Time zone: UTC+1 (CET)
  - Summer (DST): UTC+2 (CEST)
- Postal code: 22000 Šibenik
- Area code: +385 (0)22

Grabovci is a settlement in the City of Vodice in Croatia. In 2021, its population was 75.

== Demographics ==
Grabovci: Population trends 1857–2021
v

population	24		17	30	38	66	100	74	91	99	112	102	91	81	76	87	75
	1857	1869	1880	1890	1900	1910	1921	1931	1948	1953	1961	1971	1981	1991	2001	2011	2021

Sources: Croatian Bureau of Statistics publications
