= Hrabovec (disambiguation) =

Hrabovec is a village in Slovakia.

Hrabovec may also refer to:

- Nižný Hrabovec
- Vyšný Hrabovec
- Ruský Hrabovec
- Hrabovec nad Laborcom
