= Grabowiec, Gmina Bobowo =

Village in Pomeranian Voivodeship, Poland

Grabowiec
- Village
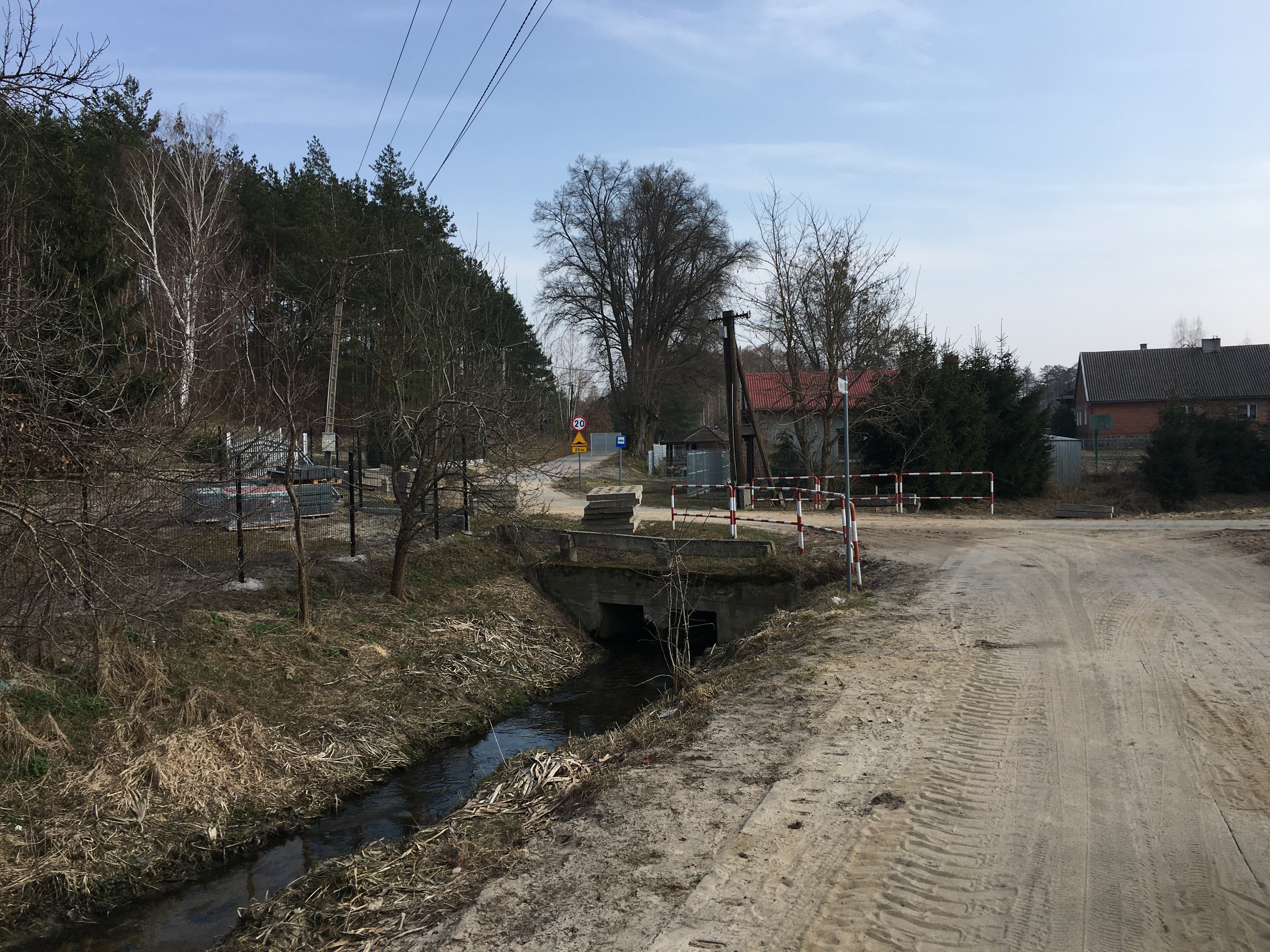

- Location within Poland
- Coordinates: 53°54′19″N 18°35′45″E
- Country: Poland
- Voivodeship: Pomeranian
- County: Starogard
- Gmina: Bobowo

Population (2022)
  - Total: 197
- Time zone: UTC+1 (CET)
  - Summer (DST): UTC+2 (CEST)
- Vehicle registration: GST

Grabowiec [ɡraˈbɔvjɛt͡s] is a village in the administrative district of Gmina Bobowo, within Starogard County, Pomeranian Voivodeship, in northern Poland. It is located within the ethnocultural region of Kociewie in the historic region of Pomerania.
