= Grabovica Gornja =

- Village
- Location within Bosnia and Herzegovina
- Coordinates: 44.5682775°N 18.7240424°E
- Country: Bosnia and Herzegovina
- Entity: Federation of Bosnia and Herzegovina
- Canton: Tuzla
- Municipality: Tuzla

Area
  - Total: 1.75 sq mi (4.52 km^{2})

Population (2013)
  - Total: 327
  - Density: 187/sq mi (72.3/km^{2})
- Time zone: UTC+1 (CET)
  - Summer (DST): UTC+2 (CEST)

Grabovica Gornja is a village in the municipality of Tuzla, Tuzla Canton, Bosnia and Herzegovina.

== Demographics ==
According to the 2013 census, its population was 327.

Ethnicity in 2013
Ethnicity	Number	Percentage
Croats	303	92.7%
Bosniaks	17	5.2%
Serbs	3	0.9%
other/undeclared	4	1.2%
Total	327	100%
