= Grabovica River =

Grabovica River may refer to:

- Grabovica (Vapa), a river in Serbia, in the municipality of Sjenica, tributary of Vapa
- Grabovica (Golijska Moravica), a river in Serbia, in the municipality of Ivanjica, tributary of Golijska Moravica
- Grabovička River (Bosnian: Grabovička rijeka, "Grabovica River"), a river in Bosnia and Herzegovina, tributary of Vrbanja
