= Leonardos Philaras =

Greek scholar, writer and politician (c. 1595–1673)

Leonardos Philaras (Λεονάρδος Φιλαρᾶς)
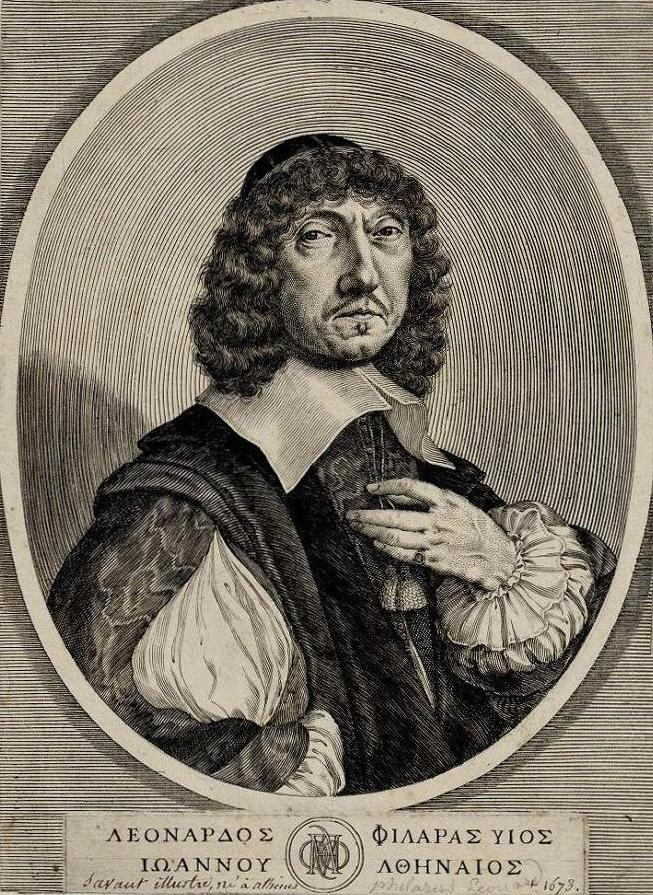
- Leonardos Philaras, 1658
- Born: Leonardos Philaras (Λεονάρδος Φιλαρᾶς); 1595; Athens, Ottoman Greece
- Died: 1673 (aged 77–78); Paris, Kingdom of France
- Occupations: Scholar, politician, diplomat, medical doctor, Supporter of Greek independence
- Writing career
- Genres: Greek independence, Greek literature, and Medicine
- Literary movement: Renaissance, Greek literature, Medicine

Signature
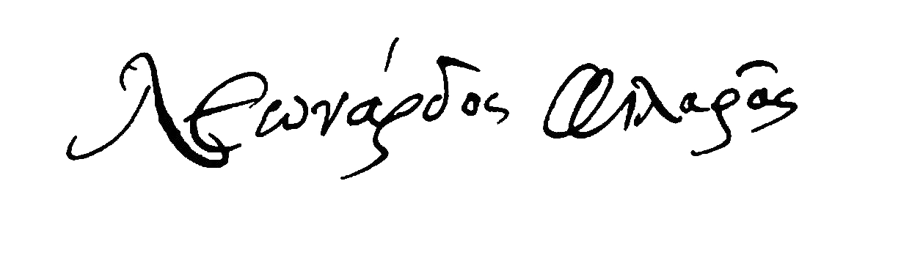

Leonardos Philaras (c. 1595 – 1673)(Greek: Λεονάρδος Φιλαρᾶς, Leonardos Filaras, French: Leonard Philara also known as Villeret, Villare) was a Greek French scholar, politician, philosopher, writer, diplomat, and doctor of theology. He is best known for his plot to liberate Greece in the early 1600s along with Charles III as Duke of Nevers, who proclaimed himself King Constantine Palaeologus which never surfaced. Philaras wrote a poem for the Virgin Mary entitled Τῇ Θεοτόκῳ καὶ ἀειπαρθένῳ Μαρίᾳ ἁγνῶς καὶ ἀμώμως συλληφθείσῃ (To the Virgin Mary, the Mother of God, the fruit of a Pure Immaculate Conception) and became well known among European aristocracy serving as ambassador to the French court of French King Louis XIII for the Duke of Parma Odoardo Farnese and French King Louis XIV for the Duke of Parma Ranuccio II Farnese. Philaras also became acquainted with Cardinal Richelieu and British statesmen and poet John Milton. Philaras campaigned to liberate Greece his entire life.

Philaras was born to a prominent Greek family in Athens while it was part of the Ottoman Empire, and his father's name was Ioannis. He travelled to Rome from a young age, where he studied at the Pontifical Greek College of Saint Athanasius from 1613-1617 and obtained the equivalent of a doctorate of divinity. In 1619, along with Charles, known as King Constantine and the Greek community of Rome, Philaras was involved in an organized plot to overthrow the Ottoman Empire and liberate Greece. The small group was able to amass a massive European force, but the organized plot ended during the 1620s before they could go to battle. By the 1630s, Philaras was a diplomat living in Paris, France. He continued his diplomatic services throughout the 1640s. He was honored in 1644, when his ode entitled: Ode in Immaculatam Conceptionem Deiparæ cum Aliis Quibusdam Epigrammatibus was used in the dedication address of the fifth Archbishop of Paris François de Harlay de Champvallon.

By the 1650s, Philaras had a feud with Cardinal Richelieu's replacement Cardinal Mazarin, who suspected him of treason. Mazarin had him put under house arrest and forced him to sell his belongings. There was constant instability between France and England, Charles I was beheaded several years prior, and Philaras was in contact with John Milton about the liberation of Greece in 1652. Milton instigated the removal of the catholic King. In 1654, after Philaras' removal as ambassador of the Duke of Parma to the French King, he briefly traveled to England and met Milton. By the late 1650s, Philaras was the ambassador of the Duke of Parma living in Venice. He moved back to Paris following the death of Mazarin in 1661. Close to the end of his life, he was honored by being elected the Librarian of the Marciana Library in Venice in 1668, a prestigious position he never filled due to his ill health. He died several years later in Paris in 1673.

== Biography ==
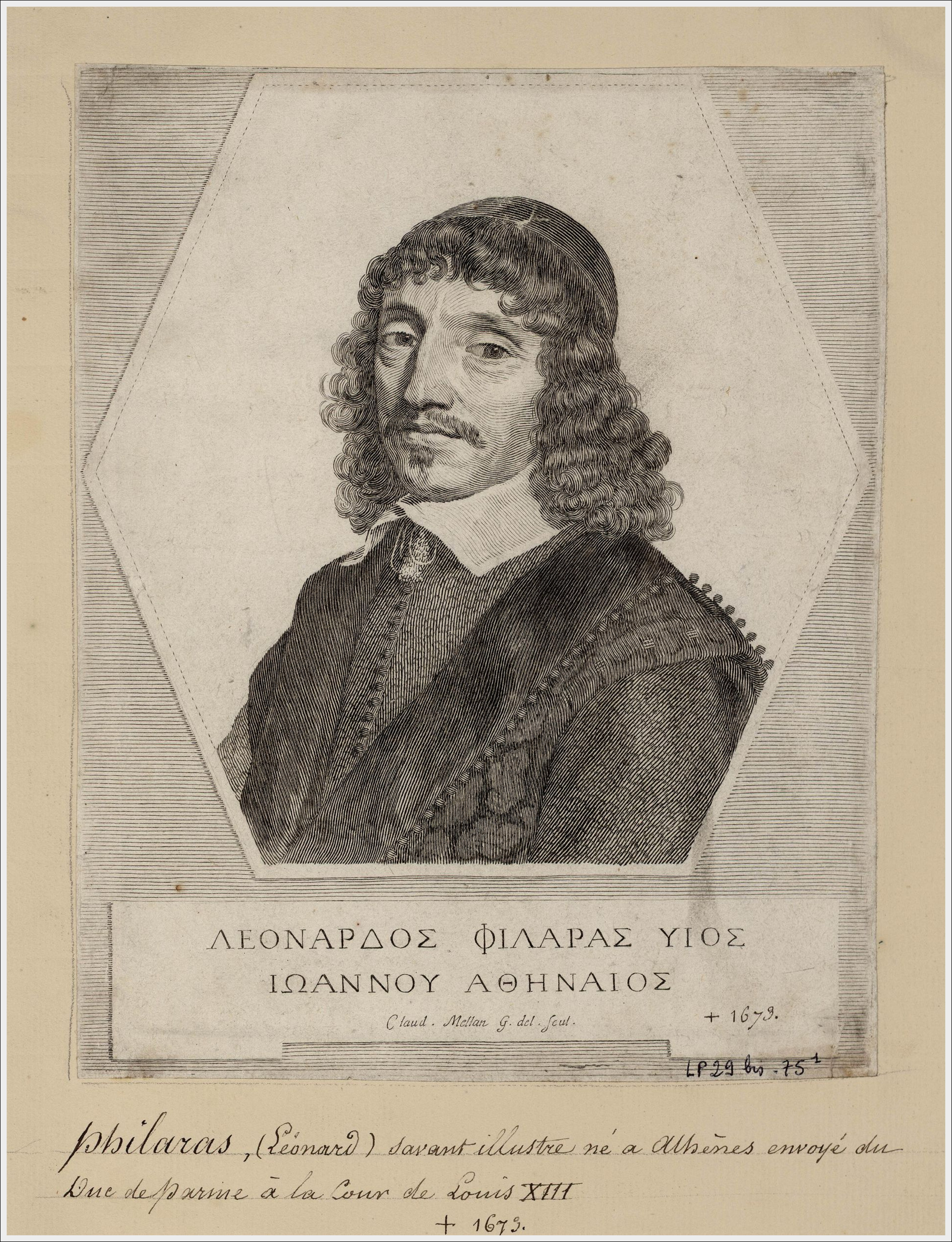
Leonardos Philaras by Claude Mellan, 1673.

Leonardos Philaras was born in Athens to a distinguished Athenian family. His father's name was Ioannis. From a young age, Philaras exhibited a higher level of intelligence and was sent to study at the Greek College in Rome from 1613-1617, where he studied Greek and Latin and received a doctorate in theology. There was a huge Greek influence throughout Europe, and in Venice, San Giorgio dei Greci was the epicenter for Greek scholars. A large number of Greeks also inhabited Crete and the Ionian Islands which belonged to the Republic of Venice. Regretably, the Venetians enlisted countless Greeks to fight wars against the Ottoman Empire. Philaras sought to liberate Greece from the tyranny and enslavement of the Ottoman Empire.

Former members of the Byzantine Royal family were scattered around Europe, one example was Thomas Asen Palaiologos who founded Santi Pietro e Paolo dei Greci. Philaras became acquainted with Charles, Duke of Nevers, a descendant of the Byzantine Emperor Andronicus II Palaeologus. Charles served as the ambassador of Henry IV of France at the Vatican. Charles met Philaras and other members of the Greek community in Rome in 1619. They all trusted Charles and supported his hereditary claims to the throne, naming him King Constantine Palaeologus. They tried to help him liberate Greece from the Ottoman Empire. During this period, they worked hard to obtain the assistance of many important European figures but their efforts did not amount to a significant battle and the maniots of Greece were in contact with the group and were known for constantly holding uprisings against the Ottomans.

During the 1630s and 1640s, Philaras became the ambassador to the French court of the French King Louis XIII for the Duke of Parma Odoardo Farnese. While he was in France, Philaras became close friends with Cardinal Richelieu. In 1633, he translated Saint Robert Bellarmine's Doctrina Christiana from vernacular Greek to Latin for Richelieu, and by 1644, Philaras wrote Τῇ Θεοτόκῳ καὶ ἀειπαρθένῳ Μαρίᾳ ἁγνῶς καὶ ἀμώμως συλληφθείσῃ (To the Virgin Mary, the Mother of God, the fruit of a Pure Immaculate Conception) and Έγκωμιαστικον εισ τον έξοχωτατον καρδινάλιν δούκα τον Ριχελιον (Encomiastic to the most distinguished Cardinal Duke Richelieu). Philaras constantly campaigned for the Greek cause throughout his life, obtaining connections within the highest European circles.

By the 1650s, he became friends with English poet John Milton, who served as a civil servant for the Commonwealth of England under its Council of State and later under Oliver Cromwell. Philaras served as ambassador to the French King Louis XIV for the Duke of Parma Ranuccio II Farnese until April 1654. Philaras was fifty-nine years old. Cardinal Mazarin distrusted Philaras and had him removed as ambassador to the Duke of Parma. During this period, Philaras traveled to England and met with John Milton. Three years later, Philaras was in Venice as ambassador to the Duke of Parma while the Venetian Empire was involved in its fifth Ottoman–Venetian War also known as the Cretan War (1645–1669). Philaras returned to Paris in 1661 upon the death of Cardinal Mazarin.

The Procuratori di San Marco was a notable position in Venice, Italy, occupied by nobles belonging to the most influential families. The Procurators of Saint Mark were a select group of individuals with power second to the Doge of Venice, the number sometimes reaching forty individuals. Their offices were Procurators' offices, called ridotti, and were located on the upper floor of the Marciana Library in Saint Mark's Square. They held Philaras in such high esteem that they invited the diplomat to become Librarian of the Marciana Library in 1668, a prestigious position which was offered to prominent intellectuals. Philaras was suffering ill health and was reluctant to travel to Venice, Italy, until his health improved. He died several years later in 1673 during cystotomy surgery in his late 70s.

== Literary works ==
Books and Articles authored by Leonardos Philaras
Date	Title	Title in English
1633	Nέα έκδοση του Δόγμα Χριστιάνα του Αγίου Ρόμπερτ Μπελαρμίν (translation of vernacular Greek from 1600s to Latin)	New version of St. Robert Bellarmine's Doctrina Christiana
1644	Τῇ Θεοτόκῳ καὶ ἀειπαρθένῳ Μαρίᾳ ἁγνῶς καὶ ἀμώμως συλληφθείσῃ	To the Virgin Mary, the Mother of God, the fruit of a Pure Immaculate Conception
1644	Έγκωμιαστικον εισ τον έξοχωτατον καρδινάλιν δούκα τον Ριχελιον	Encomiastic to the most distinguished Cardinal Duke Richelieu
1644	Ode in immaculatam conceptionem Deiparæ cum aliis quibusdam epigrammatibus ,	Ode on the Immaculate Conception of the Virgin Mary with some other epigrams

== See also ==
- Greek scholars in the Renaissance
- Defensio Secunda
- Constantijn Huygens
- Marcantonio Giustinian
- Gaston, Duke of Orléans

== Bibliography ==
- Masson, David (1877). The Life of John Milton Narrated in Connexion with the Political, Ecclesiastical, and Literary History of His Time Vol. IV. 1649 — 1654. London, England: Macmillan and Co.
- Hunter, Jr., William B. (1979). A Milton Encyclopedia Volume 6. Lewisburg, Pennsylvania: Bucknell University Press.
- Sainty, Guy Stair (2018). The Constantinian Order of Saint George and the Angeli, Farnese and Bourbon families which governed it. Madrid, Spain: Boletín Oficial del Estado.
- Paradoulakis, Dimitris (2022). Loyal to the Republic, Pious to the Church Aspects of Interconfessionality in the Life and Work of Gerasimos Vlachos (1607–1685). Göttingen, Germany: Vandenhoeck & Ruprecht Verlage. ISBN 9783847013945.
- Pontani, Filippomaria; Weise, Stefan (2021). The Hellenizing Muse A European Anthology of Poetry in Ancient Greek from the Renaissance to the Present. Berlin, Germany: De Gruyter. ISBN 9783110652758.
- Glixon, Beth (2005). Inventing the Business of Opera The Impresario and His World in Seventeenth Century Venice. Oxford, England: Oxford University Press. ISBN 9780195348361.
- Hinds M.A., Allen B. (1930). Calendar of State Papers and Manuscripts Relating to English Affairs Existing in the Archives and Collections of Venice, and in Other Libraries of Northern Italy, Volume 30 1655-1656. London, England: His Majesty's Stationery Office.
- Arabatzis, Georgios; Steiris, Georgios (2016). The Problem of Modern Greek Identity From the Ecumene to the Nation-State. Cambridge, England: Cambridge Scholars Publishing. ISBN 9781443892827.
- Boito, Camillo (1888). The Basilica of S. Mark in Venice Illustrated from the Points of View of Art and History By Venetian Writers Under the Direction of Camillo Boito. Translated by Scott, William. Venice, Italy: Ferdinando Ongania Publishing.
- Villani, Stefano (2020). "Villeré (Philaras), Leonardo". Dizionario Biografico degli Italiani (in Italian). Vol. 99: Verrazzano–Vittorio Amedeo. Rome: Istituto dell'Enciclopedia Italiana. ISBN 978-88-12-00032-6.
- Evans, Tomos Frederick (June 2023). Milton’s Hellenism (PDF) (Thesis). Birmingham, England: University of Birmingham Department of English Literature. Archived (PDF) from the original on 14 July 2024.
- Michaud, Joseph-François; Michaud, Louis-Gabriel (1823). Biographie Universelle, Ancienne et Moderne, ou Histoire [Universal Biography, Ancient and Modern, or History] (in French). Paris, France: Chez L. G. Michaud, Libraire Editeur.
