= Daimonoioannes family =

The Daimonoioannes family (Greek: Δαιμονοϊωάννης) or Eudaimonoioannes (Εὐδαιμονοϊωάννης) was a noble Byzantine Greek family, or group of families, active in the 13th to 17th centuries. Particularly associated with Monemvasia, its members were also active in the wider Peloponnese, Kythira, and Crete, where they apparently moved en masse in the 16th century, following the Ottoman capture of Monemvasia.

== History ==
The family first appears, as Daimonoioannes, in the 1220s, in a speech by the Archbishop of Ohrid, Demetrios Chomatenos. The origin of the name is unknown; daimon means "demon", but may, according to Haris Kalligas, possibly refer to the site of Daimonia at Cape Maleas near Monemvasia. In the popular language, it became Daimonogiannes (Δαιμονογιάννης), as it is found in the Chronicle of the Morea, and variously Demonozaneus, Demonozannes, and de Mon[o]ianis in Western sources. It is only in the mid-14th century and after that the name acquired the form Eudaimonoiannes or Eudaimonogiannes with the addition of the prefix "eu-", "good", which henceforth became the standard form the family used.

From the outset the family were mostly associated with the fortress city of Monemvasia and the wider southern Peloponnese, while others were active in the island of Kythira off the Peloponnesian coast and in Venetian-ruled Crete, and a few as far afield as Venice itself, Serres, Constantinople, or the Kingdom of Naples. It is unclear whether all the bearers of the family name were members of the same family, and it has been suggested that there existed two closely related families with the same name, one in the Peloponnese and one in Crete. However, as the family first appears in the Peloponnese and Kythira, and only from the 16th century on occurs frequently in Crete (with 25 family members in the 16th century alone), it is more likely that the family moved to the island then, with the bulk of the family probably abandoning Monemvasia for Crete in 1545. The family also ruled Kythira, beginning perhaps as early as the 12th century, until 1238, when it passed to the Venetian House of Venier. The family remained active in the island thereafter, at least up to the mid-16th century.

Later scholars from the 16th to 18th centuries, linked the family to the last Byzantine imperial dynasty of the Palaiologoi. The 16th-century scholar Francesco Sansovino wrote that a certain John Palaiologos received the sobriquet "Eudaimonoioannes", i.e. "Fortunate John", for his exploits. He was followed by other notable historians like Du Cange and Girolamo Muzio, while the 18th-century writers Niccolò Comneno Papadopoli and Flaminius Cornelius recorded that the noted scholar Andreas Eudaimonoioannes descended from the Palaiologoi. In so far as can be determined by modern research, however, the two families were unrelated except for a single marriage; Sansovino's account may be a later invention by the family itself, as the form "Eudaimonoioannes" does not appear until near the middle of the 14th century. They did intermarry however with other noble families, as indicated by the occurrence of double surnames containing the family names Komnenos, Sarantenos, Notaras, Akatzas, Sophianos, and Komes alongside that of Daimonoioannes/Eudaimonoiannes.

== Members ==
Note: Uncertain or erroneous family members are denoted in italics.

Name	Flourished	Notes	Refs
Daimonoioannes	ca. 1180s	Presumed first member of the family to rule Kythira, in the 1180s. Local tradition ascribes him the construction of a tower as well as a number of churches and villages in the island. Possibly the grandfather of Nicholas Daimonoioannes.	
George Daimonoioannes	ca. 1220s	Bearer of the title of protopansebastohypertatos, he was embroiled in a dispute with another regional magnate, John Chamaretos, due to his pro-Latin stance.	
Nicholas Daimonoioannes	ca. 1230–38	Bearer of the title sebastos, he participated in the Cretan revolt against Venice in the 1230s. Chrysa Maltezou also identifies him with the ruler of Kythira, who in 1238 married his daughter to Bartolomeo Venier, with Kythira and estates in Crete as dowry.	
Paul Sebastos Monogiannes	ca. 1260s	Erroneous identification by Karl Hopf of a certain Paul Sebastos, as governor of Kythira under Michael VIII Palaiologos. This has been followed by several later authors, including William Miller and Angelos Nezeritis' Lexicon of the Byzantine Peloponnese.	
Daimonogiannes	ca. 1246	Unknown member of the family, according to the Chronicle of the Morea he and representatives of the Sophianos and Mamonas families surrendered Monemvasia to William II of Villehardouin in 1246.	
Daimonogiannes	ca. 1278	Recorded as "Demonozannes de Malvasia". Unknown member of the family, a corsair in Byzantine service alongside John de lo Cavo, active in the waters around Euboea. In some works identified with the previous.	
"Michel de Monemvasia"	ca. 1289	Uncertain, but possibly a member of the family.	
Monogiannes	ca. 1320	Attested in a letter—in all probability a 16th/17th-century forgery—of Emperor Andronikos II Palaiologos.	
Nikephoros Daimonogiannes	ca. 1332	Owner of a ship plying the Apokoronas–Candia route in Crete in 1332.	
Nicholas Daimonogiannes	ca. 1333	Ship owner from Monemvasia, attested in a 1333 document from Crete.	
Sebastos Daimonoioannes	ca. 1338	Inhabitant of Monemvasia, attested (as "Sevastus Dhemonoiani") in a 1338 document from Crete on the sale of a slave.	
Kostas Daimonogiannes	ca. 1339	Inhabitant of Axos in Mylopotamos, Crete, attested in a 1339 document on the sale of cheese.	
Manuel Eudaimonoioannes	ca. 1346	Attested (as "Manuel Eudaemon") as the owner of a manuscript with the homilies of John Chrysostom, now in the Bodleian Library.	
Demetrios Komnenos Eudaimonoioannes	ca. 1360–66	Kephale (governor) of Serres in 1360, and katholikos krites (judge) in the city in 1365–66. The city was part of the Serbian Empire at the time.	
John and Michael Daimonoiannes	ca. 1386–90/91	Relatives (mentioned as "Jane de Monoiane" and "Micali de Monoiane") engaged in trade in the Black Sea with a ship belonging partly to a Genoese and partly to Emperor John V Palaiologos (or John VII). John, a resident of Constantinople, sold wheat to Caffa in 1386/7, and died at Tanais in 1390/91.	
Constantine Sarantenos Daimonoiannes	ca. 1394	Inhabitant of the Venetian fort of Coron, mentioned as plenipotentiary of Theodore I Palaiologos in a financial case.	
Theodore Daimonoiannes Notaras	ca. 1409	Wealthy merchant from Candia, attested in a Venetian document of 1409.	
George Komes Daimonoiannes	ca. 1409	Wealthy merchant from Candia, collaborator of Theodore.	
Nicholas Eudaimonoioannes	ca. 1407–23	The best-known member of the family, regent of the Despotate of the Morea during the minority of Theodore II Palaiologos, megas stratopedarches in the Morea, and ambassador of Manuel II Palaiologos to the Council of Constance and Venice.	
Andronikos Eudaimonoioannes	ca. 1416–20	Mentioned by Ulrich von Richental (as "Andriuoco von der Morea") as the son and companion of Nicholas at Constance and Venice.	
George Eudaimonoioannes	ca. 1437–50	Son of the above, in the service of the Despot of the Morea, either Theodore II or his brother Demetrios Palaiologos, with the rank of stratopedarches. Possibly the unnamed Eudaimonoioannes who was the father-in-law of Matthew Palaiologos Asen according to Sphrantzes and the later Political History of Constantinople.	
Makariotes Eudaimonoioannes	ca. 1432–38	An inhabitant of Corfu, he is attested ("Makariotis Monoioannes") in a Venetian document of 1438 recording his loyalty during the Genoese attack on Corfu in 1432.	
Emmanuel Eudaimonoioannes	ca. 1446	Attested ("Humanuel Eudemonoiani") in a Venetian document of 1446 on the construction of a pier in Constantinople.	
John Sophianos Daimonoioannes	ca. 1440s	A lord of the Morea, in the service of Despot Constantine Palaiologos. Possibly the unnamed Eudaimonoioannes who was the father-in-law of Matthew Palaiologos Asen. His existence however is uncertain, and may be the result of a conflation of two different families by Makarios Melissenos.	
Eudaimonoioannes	ca. 1446	Attested ("Humanuel Eudemonoiani") in a Venetian document of 1446 on the construction of a pier in Constantinople.	
Manolis Eudaimonoioannes	ca. 1450	Priest, mentioned in the Chronicle of Saint Theodore of Kythira on a dispute about the possession of the namesake monastery.	
Leo Eudaimonoioannes	ca. 1450s	Recorded only by Makarios Melissenos as one of the supporters of Thomas Palaiologos against his brother Demetrios. If he existed, he was likely also the son of Nicholas.	
Tarchaniotes(?) Daimonogiannes	ca. 1462	Recorded (as "Tracagianni de Monogianni") in a 1563 document as having, along with Theodore Zaccona, armed a fusta during the Siege of Mytilene by the Ottomans.	
Theodore Eudaimonoioannes	ca. 1501	Living in Crete, he is attested in a Venetian charter granting him privileges in 1501.	
Leo Eudaimonoioannes	ca. 1509	Mentioned in a notary act of 11 January 1509 in Candia.	
Paul and Manolis Eudaimonogiannes	ca. 1511	Manolis, from Kythira, was accused with three others of murder and robbery in 1511, and a price was put on his head. Paul was his father.	
Gregorios Eudaimonogiannes	ca. 1538–76	Hailing from Kythira, Gregory became a monk and between 1559 and his death in 1576 hegumenos (apparently with interruptions) of the Ankarathos Monastery in Crete.	
Arsenios Eudaimonogiannes	ca. 1576	Hegumenos of the Ankarathos Monastery in Crete in June 1576, the successor of Gregory.	
John Eudaimonoioannes	mid-16th century	He lived in Candia and was married to a Barbarigo. He was engaged in wine sale and owned mills. His father was named Theodore, possibly the same as recorded in 1501.	
Sophianos Eudaimonogiannes	ca. 1539–66/70	A citizen of Monemvasia, he and his sons played a leading role in its defence against the Ottomans. Following the fall of the city, he was compensated with estates in Crete by Venice in 1545, where he moved with his family.	
Tarchaniotes Eudaimonogiannes	ca. 1539–52	Son of the above, he served as a lieutenant at Chania. Also attested as "Nicholas Daimonoioannes, called Tarchaniotes" ("Nicolo Demonoiani ditto Traxanioti").	
Theodore Eudaimonogiannes	ca. 1528–83	Son of Sophianos, he is attested as a member of the Greek Community in Venice, as garrison commander of Monemvasia in 1539, and then active at Chania along with his brothers.	
Asanes Eudaimonogiannes	ca. 1542–75/83	Son of Sophianos, he is attested as a member of the Greek Community in Venice, and in Crete after 1556. He may have died by 1575, but is (possibly erroneously) mentioned in another document in 1583.	
Manolis Daimonoioannes	ca. 1540–71	Son of Sophianos, he is attested as garrison commander of Chania in 1571. He may be identifiable with one or both of men of the same name attested in a series of contemporary documents. A "Manoli Eudemonoiani" is attested in 1553, coming from Monemvasia, he was married to Sebatse and had a daughter, Marulla or Marietta. A "Manoli Demonogianni" was dead by 1569, and had a daughter called Marietta.	
Kanakis or Kavakis Eudaimonoioannes	ca. 1539	Son of Sophianos, died at Monemvasia in 1539.	
Kanakis Eudaimonoioannes	ca. 1545	Illegitimate son of Sophianos, attested serving in Tarchaniotes' company in 1545.	
Sophianos Daimonogiannes	ca. 1539–53/91	Son of Theodore, he replaced his uncle Kanakis when he died at Monemvasia in 1539. In 1545 he was moved to Tarchaniotes' company, and succeeded him as its commander. He is possibly to be identified with the Sophianos Eudaimonogiannes who pursued a distinguished career in the Venetian military between 1568 and 1591.	
Sophianos Daimonogiannes	1532–53/91	Son of Tarchaniotes, he succeeded his father as head of his company in 1552, before his namesake cousin replaced him. Like the latter, he is possibly to be identified with the Sophianos Eudaimonogiannes who pursued a distinguished career in the Venetian military between 1568 and 1591.	
Antonios Daimonogiannes	1569–82	Son of Asanes, he followed a career in the Venetian fleet, fighting with distinction in the Ottoman–Venetian War of 1570–73. He was also a notable scholar on theological matters, and a friend of Makarios Melissenos. Girolamo Muzio dedicated his father's biography to Antonios.	
Manuel and Peros Eudaimonoioannes	ca. 1549	Peros was a merchant living in Candia and mentioned in a series of legal documents from 1549. Manuel was his father.	
Michael and John Eudaimonoioannes	ca. 1549	John was a salted fish merchant living in Candia, an associate of Peros. Michael was his father.	
John Eudaimonoioannes	ca. 1549	Witness in a document of the notary Michael maras in 1549.	
Georgis, Manuel, and Athanasios Eudaimonoioannes	ca. 1549–71	Coming from Kythira, Athanasios became a monk in the Ankarathos Monastery in 1549 or 1552. Later deputy of the hegumenoi Neophytos Notaras and Gregorios Eudaimonogiannes. Georgis was his father, and Manuel his uncle. Both were deceased by 1549.	
John Eudaimonoioannes Kontos	ca. 1563	Attested as a witness in a 1563 document from Kythira.	
John Eudaimonoioannes	ca. 1565	Attested as a landowner in the Mangounades area of Kythira in a 1565 document. Possibly identical with the previous.	
Theodore Eudaimonoioannes	ca. 1565	Attested as cousin of Andreas Libounes of Kythira in a 1565 document.	
Manolis Daimonoioannes	mid-16th century	Attested as the father of Maria and grandfather of Manolis Kapsanes Kalevetes, who inherited from his mother land in the Mangounades area of Kythira, in a 1566 document. Possibly identical with the unnamed husband, in a 1565 document, of a certain Catherine, who after his death left the island for Venice.	
Catherine Daimonogianne	died 1570	Buried at the Campo dei Greci cemetery in Venice in March 1570. Possibly the wife of the previous.	
Theodore Eudaimonoioannes	ca. 1579	Attested in an inscription as attending the University of Padua in 1579.	
Michelis and Manousos Ebdoumanes	ca. 1583	Manousos ("Manusso Eudhumani"), son of Michelis ("Micheli Eudhumani"), is attested in a 1583 document owing wheat. The name may be a mistranscription of "Eudaimonoioannes".	
Arsenios Eudaimonoioannes	ca. 1577–84	Born in Kythira, he became hegumenos of the Ankarathos Monastery in 1577, although he seems to have exercised authority even before his election. The monastery's finances flourished under his prelature, and he managed to remove the monastery from the patronage of the powerful Kallergis family. He died in late 1584.	
Sophianos Eudaimonoioannes	ca. 1579–93	Roman Catholic Bishop of Siteia and Ierapetra from 3 AUgust 1579 until his death on 9 August 1593.	
Theodore Akatzas Eudaimonogiannes	ca. 1583–93(?)	Officer of the Spanish army at Naples and an acquaintance of Melissenos. Possibly the same as the "Teodoro Acanza" attested in the list of members of the Greek Community of Naples in 1593.	
Andreas Eudaimonogiannes	ca. 1583	Commander of 300 men of the Candia militia in 1583.	
"Evido Monopules Acanza"	ca. 1593	Of unknown first name, attested in the list of members of the Greek Community of Naples in 1593.	
Isavetta Daimonogianne	ca. 1594	Attested in the list of members of the Greek Community of Naples in 1594.	
Andreas Eudaimonoioannes	1555/66–1625	Jesuit scholar and theologian, graduate of the University of Padua. Born in 1555 (some sources mention 1566) at Chania, died in 1625 at Rome.	
Sophianos Eudaimonogiannes	16th century	Inhabitant of Monemvasia, he killed a certain Theodore Paschalopoulos, condemned to death in Crete, who had found refuge at Monemvasia.	
Tzouane Eudaimonoioannes	ca. 1616	Attested in a 1616 document. Brother-in-law of Tzortzis Maroulis, possibly living in Crete.	
Emmanuel Eudaimonogiannes	ca. 1629	Recorded in a birth register at Chania in 1629. His father was called Tarchaniotes, possibly identical with, or more likely the grandson, of the above.	
"Zorzina Eudemonogiani"	ca. 1677	Wife of the officer Andrea Gerarchi, living in Palmanova, attested in a 1677 document to the Senate of Venice on permission to build a bakery.	
"Georgi Monocangi"	unknown	Name found in a list of Cretan nobility and citizens. Possibly a mistranscription.	

== Sources ==
- Charalambakis, Pantelis (2010). "Οι Δαιμονοϊωάννηδες (13ος-17ος αἰ.)". Λακωνικαί Σπουδαί: Περιοδικόν σύγγραμμα της Εταιρείας Λακωνικών Σπουδών (in Greek). XIX. Athens: Society for Laconian Studies: 173–218. ISSN 1105-0349.
- Trapp, Erich; Beyer, Hans-Veit; Walther, Rainer; Sturm-Schnabl, Katja; Kislinger, Ewald; Leontiadis, Ioannis; Kaplaneres, Sokrates (1976–1996). Prosopographisches Lexikon der Palaiologenzeit (in German). Vienna: Verlag der Österreichischen Akademie der Wissenschaften. ISBN 3-7001-3003-1.
