= Nicholas Eudaimonoioannes =

Nicholas Eudaimonoioannes (Greek: Νικόλαος Εὺδαιμονοϊωάννης) was a senior Byzantine official of the early 15th century, most notable as ambassador to the Papacy during the Council of Constance and to the Republic of Venice on several occasions.

== Life ==
Nicholas is perhaps the best-known member of the noble Eudaimonoioannes family, or at any rate the one about whom most reliable information survives. Based on a manuscript colophon variously dated to either 1415/16 or 1419/20, he was a "synpetheros" of the Emperor Manuel II Palaiologos, implying a relation by marriage. What this relation was is unknown, although the Greek historian Haris Kalligas has suggested that his son George may have married a daughter of Manuel II sometime shortly after 1415.

Nicholas is first mentioned, along with his wife and children—who are not named—in an epitaph, dated to 1407, now in the Victoria and Albert Museum. In the same year, he was appointed as tutor and regent over the young Theodore II Palaiologos, who was appointed Despot of the Morea. Nicholas probably bore the title of megas stratopedarches, although this is attributed by some modern sources to his son George.

As he knew the languages spoken in Western Europe, Nicholas was appointed as the head of a Byzantine delegation to the Council of Constance in early 1416. According to Ulrich von Richental, he was accompanied among others by his otherwise unknown son Andronikos ("Andriuoco von der Morea"). The Byzantine envoys first visited Venice in February, where they offered to mediate for the conclusion of peace between the Venetian Republic and the King of Hungary, Sigismund, but also asked for aid in rebuilding the Hexamilion wall that protected the entrance to the Morea, and urged the formation of a Christian league against the Ottoman Empire. The Venetian Senate gladly welcomed the Byzantine proposal to mediate with Sigismund, but was reluctant to commit itself on either of the latter's proposals. The Byzantines arrived at Constance on 25 March 1416 and remained there for over a year, with Nicholas assisting at the election and investiture of Pope Martin V in 1417. On Nicholas' request, the new Pope gave permission for the marriage of Manuel II's two sons to Catholic princesses.

Nicholas returned to Constantinople in 1417, bearing letters from the Pope to Emperor Manuel and the Patriarch of Constantinople. In April 1419 he was at Venice, apparently on a private matter, as he sought and gained permission of the Venetian Senate for the export of wood to repair a church in his native Monemvasia. He was back at Venice in January of the next year, on another diplomatic mission from the Emperor; again he discussed with the Senate the issue of peace with Sigismund, as well as matters concerning the two states. Among the latter was securing permission by Venice for the passage of the two prospective Catholic brides, Sophia of Montferrat and Cleopa Malatesta, to Byzantium. Having obtained it, in August 1420 he accompanied the two princesses on board a Venetian galley back to Greece. His last diplomatic mission was in February 1422, when he met with the Venetian provveditore Dolfin Venier at Coron in the Morea; in a report to the Senate later, Venier proposed enticing Nicholas and his sons with the promise of estates to settle on Venetian territory. Nicholas died probably on 1 November 1423. His son George remained an influential personage in the court of the Despots of the Morea until ca. 1450.

An astronomical manuscript was attributed to him.

== Sources ==
- Charalambakis, Pantelis (2010). "Οι Δαιμονοϊωάννηδες (13ος-17ος αἰ.)". Λακωνικαί Σπουδαί: Περιοδικόν σύγγραμμα της Εταιρείας Λακωνικών Σπουδών (in Greek). XIX. Athens: Society for Laconian Studies: 173–218. ISSN 1105-0349.
- Tihon, Anne (2003). "Nicolas Eudaimonoioannes, réviseur de l'Almageste?". Byzantion: Revue Internationale des Études Byzantines (in French). 73. Brussels: 151–161. ISSN 0378-2506.
- Trapp, Erich; Beyer, Hans-Veit; Walther, Rainer; Sturm-Schnabl, Katja; Kislinger, Ewald; Leontiadis, Ioannis; Kaplaneres, Sokrates (1976–1996). Prosopographisches Lexikon der Palaiologenzeit (in German). Vienna: Verlag der Österreichischen Akademie der Wissenschaften. ISBN 3-7001-3003-1.
