= Matteo Pertsch =

Austrian architect

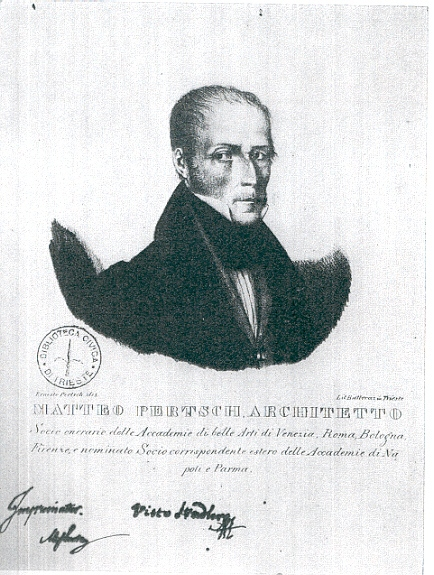
- Born: Matthäus Pertsch; 1769; Buchhorn, Austrian Empire
- Died: 11 April 1834 (aged 64–65); Trieste, Austrian Empire
- Education: Brera Academy, Milan
- Occupation: Architect
- Spouse: Maddalena Vogel
- Children: 7, including Nicolo Pertsch
- Projects: Palazzo Carciotti; Teatro Lirico Giuseppe Verdi; Grand Hotel Rogaška

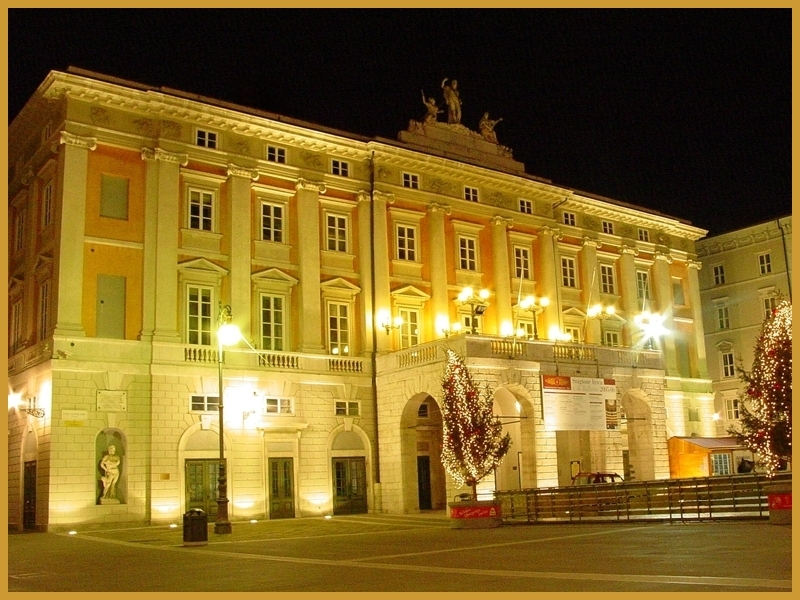
Teatro Giuseppe Verdi (Teatro Nuovo)

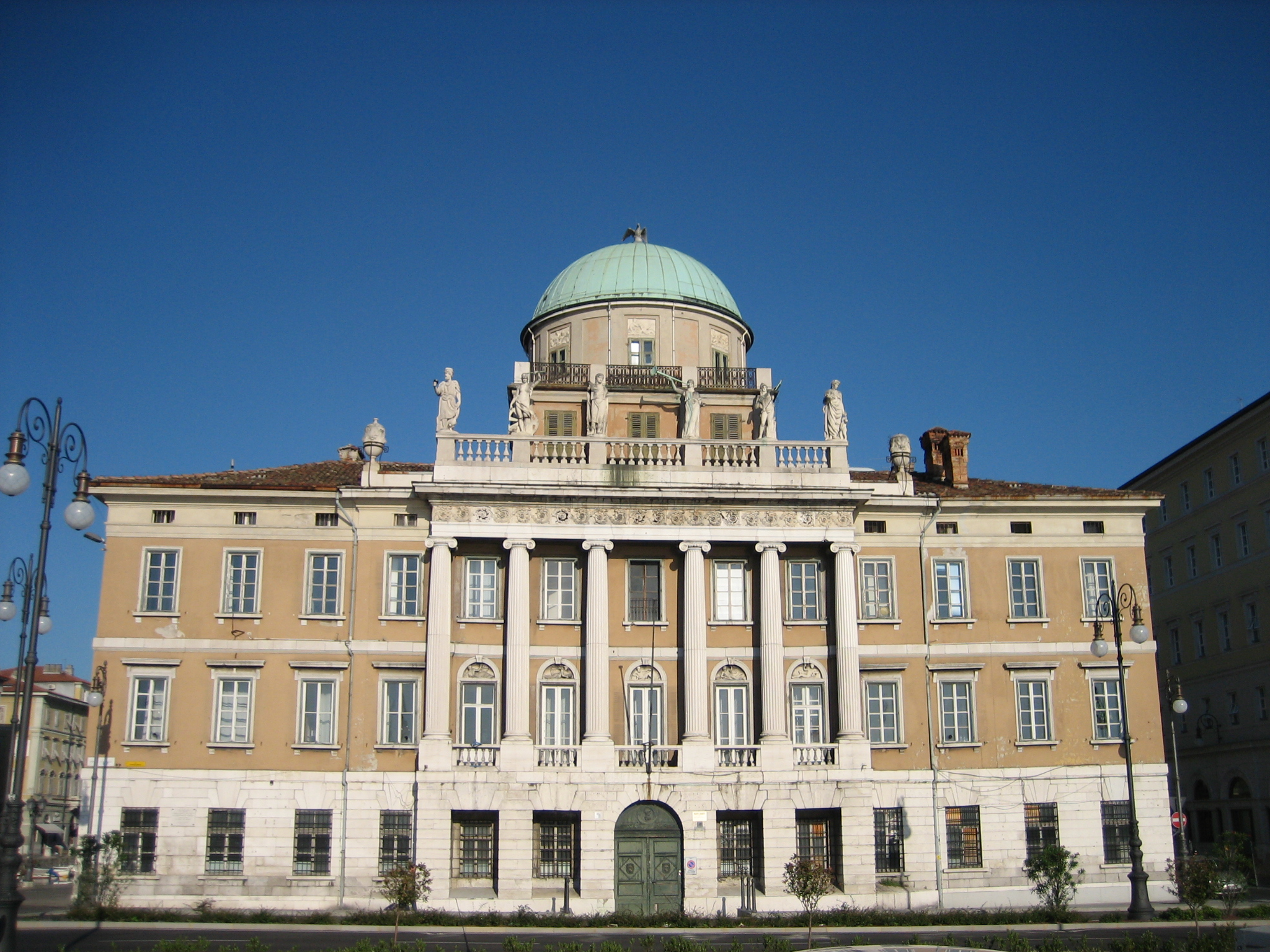
Palazzo Carciotti

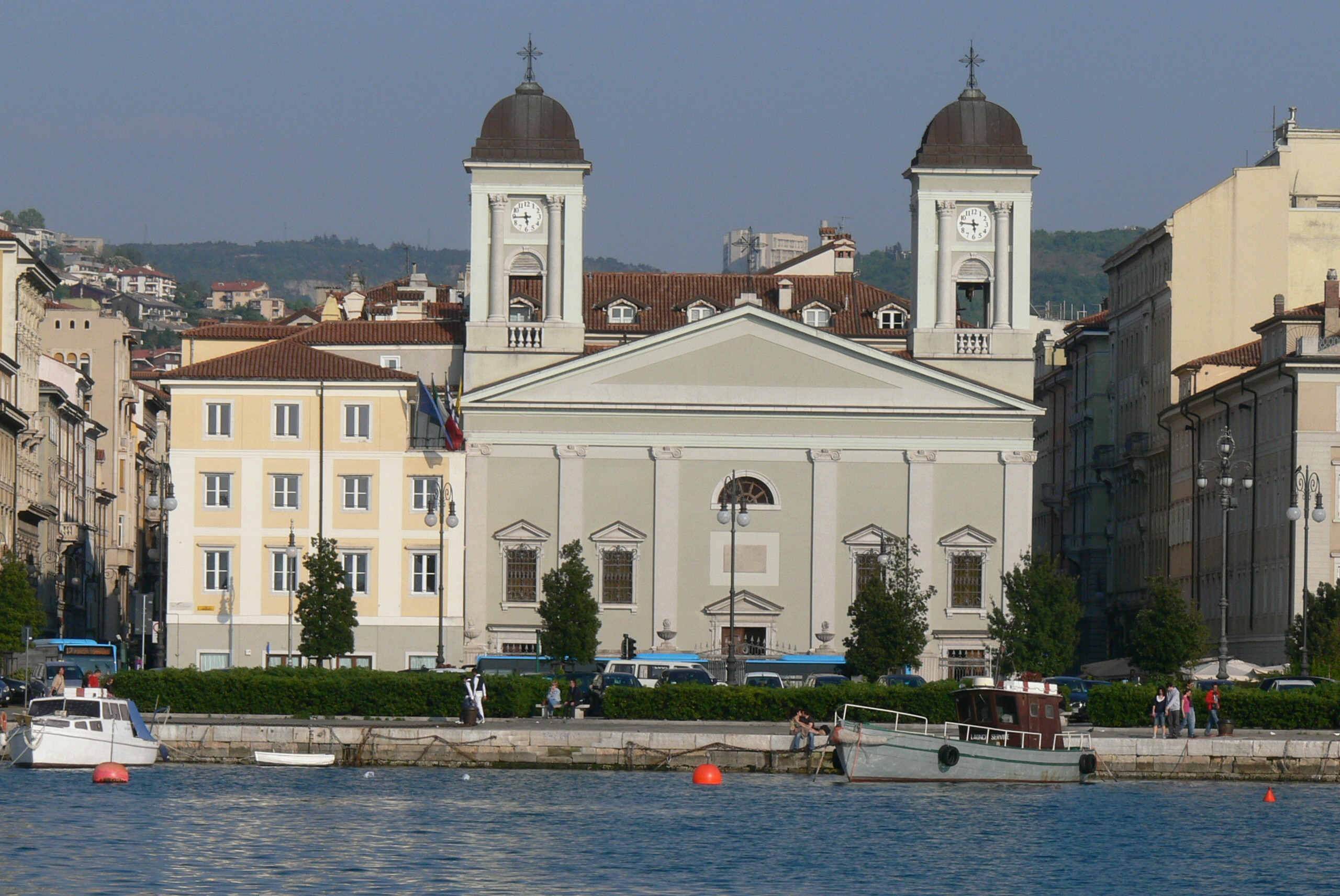
Church of San Nicolò dei Greci

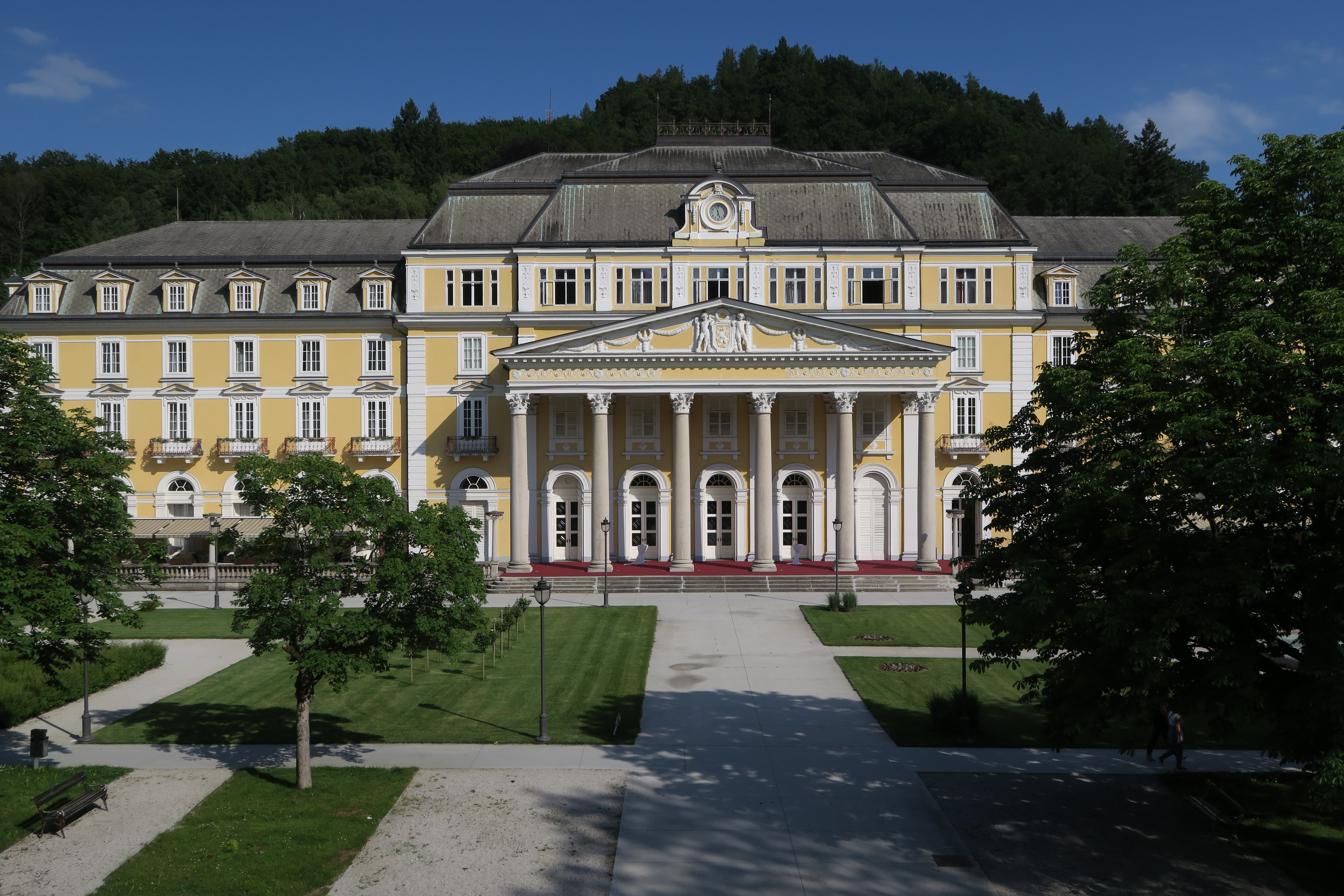
Grand Hotel Rogaška

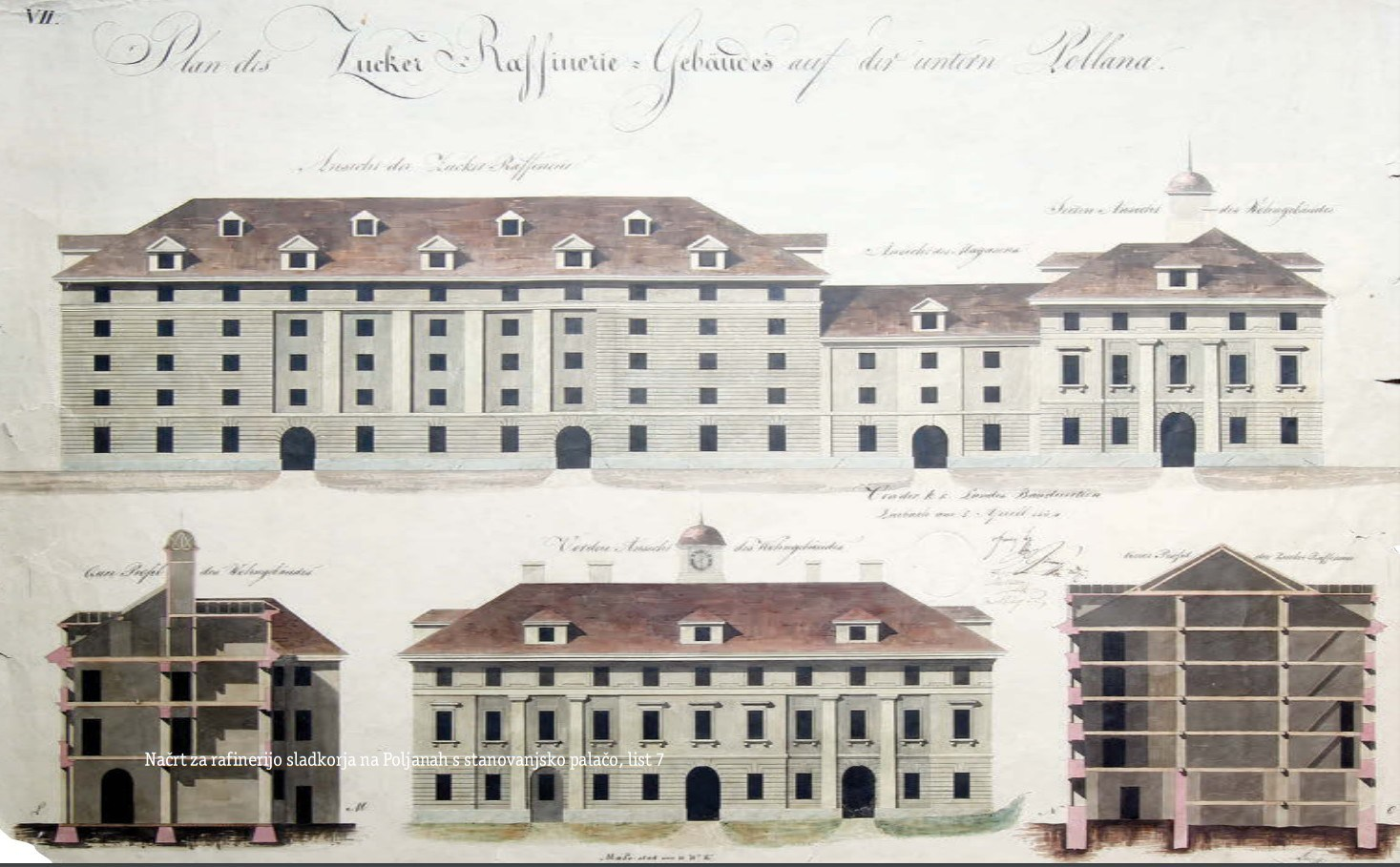
Pertsch's Drawings for the Ljubljanska Cukrarna

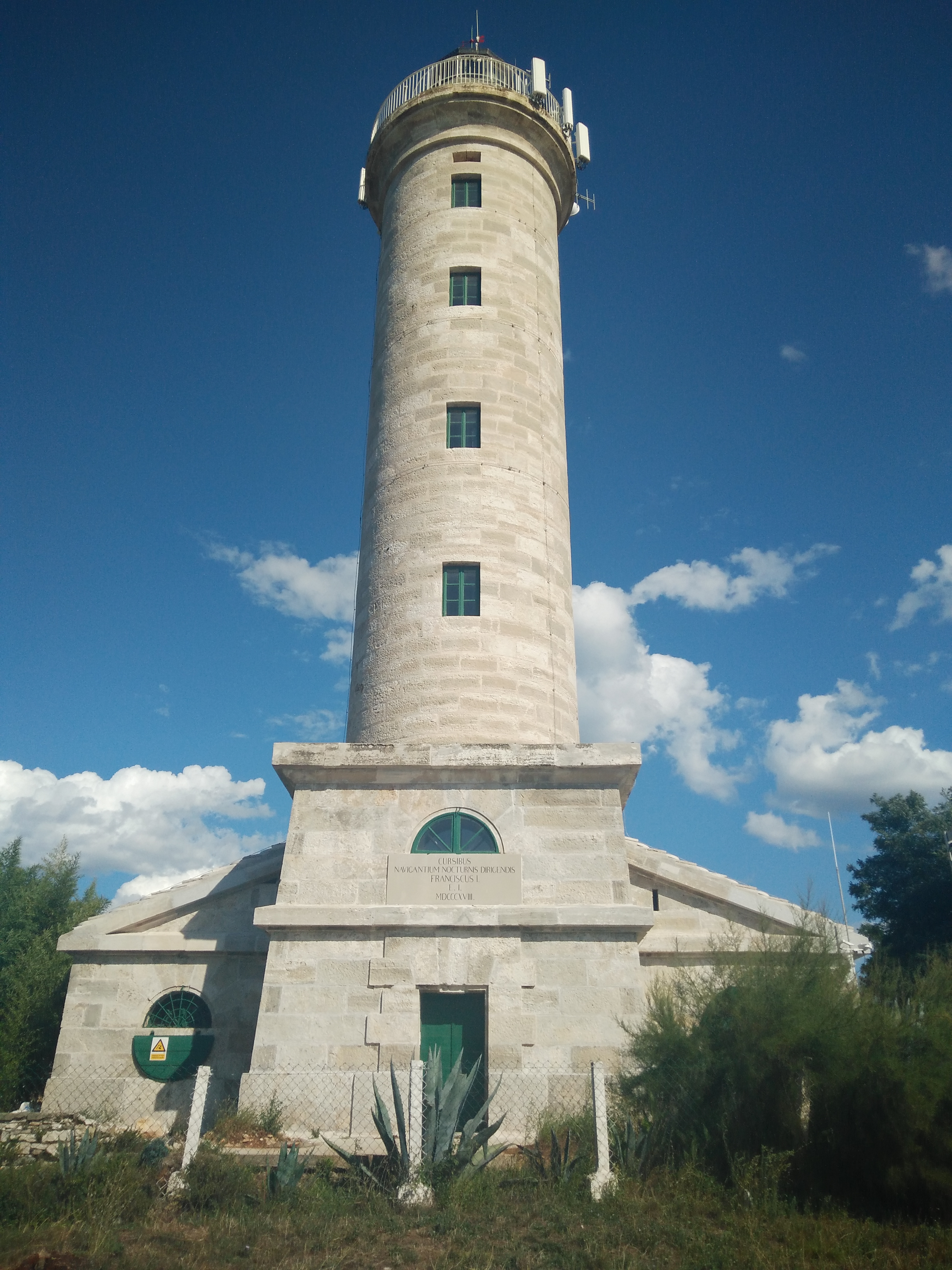
The Savudrija Lighthouse

Matteo Pertsch (1769–1834) was an Austrian architect who was prominent in the Austro-Hungarian Empire, particularly in Trieste. He was known for his embrace of Neoclassicism, favoring straightforward, classical-antique forms, and domed, temple-like buildings. With Pietro Nobile and Antonio Mollari, Pertsch created and led Trieste's early 19th-century development, and their plans and influence, and many of their structures, remain.

== Early life and education ==
Matthäus Pertsch, known as Matteo, was born in 1769 in Buchhorn, a Free Imperial city in what was then Swabian Austria on the northern shore of Lake Constance. Little is known about his family, but it is likely that his father, Peter, was a prosperous builder, as Pertsch was a skilled stonemason and his younger brother, Johann Nepomuk Pertsch, also became an architect and Munich's Chief Building Officer; both brothers were well-educated and had learned the art of drawing, as well as the history of the arts, geometry and mechanics.

In 1790, Pertsch moved to Milan to attend the Brera Academy. There he studied under two prominent architects: the Swiss Pietro Taglioretti, and the master of Italian Neoclassicism Giuseppe Piermarini, architect of La Scala and other grand buildings. In 1781, Pertsch designed a lighthouse and won the Second Architecture Prize in Parma's Accademia Ducale di Belle Arti competition. In 1794, his design for a Royal Mint won the First Architecture Prize in the same competition. Likely due to the highly unstable political climate, he applied to become a teacher of drawing at the Normalschule, one of a network of secondary institutions established by the Austrians to regulate education throughout the empire. With the French occupation of Milan in 1796, Pertsch left Milan and moved to Bergamo, a territory of Venice which was also under French occupation.

== Career ==
At that time, the Imperial Free City of Trieste was a possession of the Habsburg monarchy. and was Austria's main port and shipbuilding centre. It too had been occupied, briefly, and it was seeing tremendous political upheaval. But it was also a literary and artistic hub of central Europe, with a large merchant class and a booming economy.

One particularly wealthy businessman was the Greek textile merchant Demetrio Carciotti. who wanted to build a home for himself, from which he could also run his business. He wanted what he described as "a grandiose, painstakingly constructed building on the seafront alongside the Grand Canal, which will serve to embellish and adorn this city." Carciotti had already obtained the license to collect the stone for the project; to find the right architect, he sent a representative to Milan to find "a man of ability and taste". Someone evidently pointed this person in the direction of Matteo Pertsch, whose Normalschule application was used as a source of information, and there were positive reports of his morality and professionalism. In 1798, he received the commission to build the Carciotti Palace and moved to Trieste. Construction began in 1798 and was completed in 1805. It is a 9,784 m^{2} structure, 100 metres long, in which Pertsch combined an innovative house-warehouse solution with an elaborate artistic and sculptural program, and fire-fighting measures which he convinced authorities to apply city-wide. The palazzo also became the anchor building for the city's new waterfront neighbourhood, the Borgo Teresiano. In 1831, it became the headquarters of the Generali Insurance, then of the Austro-Hungarian Bank. During World War II, it was occupied by the Allied Military Government and then by Trieste's Port Authority. As of 2026, it is under renovation and will be used for housing and offices.

Meanwhile, another wealthy merchant, Giovanni Matteo Tommasini, wanted a new theatre for Trieste and awarded the commission to the architect Gian Antonio Selva. Selva designed a horseshoe-shaped auditorium, following the style of Venice's La Fenice. When it was completed, Tommasini felt that the façade of the building was too plain. Likely upon the recommendation of, or connection to, Piermarini, and because he could see what Pertsch was doing for Carciotti, Tommasini hired Pertsch to change the building's façade. Pertsch used elements of Piermarini's La Scala design, creating a theatre that was Viennese on the inside and Milanese on the outside. The theatre opened in 1801 and remains one of the Europe's most-visited opera houses.

In 1804, due to his skill as a builder, the governor of Trieste gave Pertsch the title of City Building Appraiser, indicating that he was doing much more than erecting buildings. This likely led to his 1808 move to the garrison city of Graz which, by this time, had been occupied by the French three times, in 1797, 1805 and in 1809. Its fortress had been demolished, and it was in the midst of rebuilding and transformation. Under Emperor Francis, Graz was established as the center of Styria to serve as a crucial cultural, residential and industrial hub. Rather than being on record as the architect of any buildings in Graz, Pertsch is on record as being an "advisor", a "provincial master mason" and a "builder". It is likely that he was hired by governing bodies to plan and develop neighbourhoods, as he had done in Trieste; by the time Pertsch left Graz in 1818, its expansion and re-development were well under way. Also while living in Graz, Pertsch completed a commission from the Slovenian Count Ferdinand Attems to build the structures for a spa which Attems was developing at the mineral springs of Rogaška Slatina. Pertsch designed the resort's Temple Pavilion, Grand Hotel and residences. During this time, he built the Savudrija Lighthouse, in what is now Croatia. There is also mention of him working in Carinthia, whose spa resort of Warmbad-Villach dates from that era, and in Carniola, after it was returned to Austria by the French in 1815.

Pertsch returned to Trieste in 1818 and was met with a long list of commissions, notably the redesign and expansion of the Greek Orthodox Church of San Nicolò dei Greci, where he was assisted by this brother Johann. He worked on the design of the new port, designing the quay and the lighthouse, La Lanterna. He consulted to the city on the construction of prisons, and on improvements to its water supply—he had been incorporating wells and water storage areas in his designs for some time; one example remains under the Rotonda Pancera, a (now-derelict) house built for the magistrate Domenico de Pancera in 1803. He also devised a system of garbage selection for composting, and a method of replacing masonry fireplaces with flues of perforated stone.

When the Scuola di Commercio e di Nautica (Commercial and Maritime School) was founded in 1818, Pertsch became its first Chairman of Architecture. While his 1801 design for the Trieste Commodity Exchange had not been accepted, its governors engaged him as a consultant for several projects. Pietro Nobile, by then head of the Habsburg Court Chamber for Factories, hired him as a consultant. In 1825, he was welcomed as a Member of Honor in the Accademia di San Luca in Rome, the Accademia di Belle Arti di Firenze, and the Accademia di Belle Arti di Venezia. In 1827, he was welcomed into the Accademia di Belle Arti di Bologna, the Accademia di Belle Arti di Napoli, and the Accademia di Belle Arti di Parma, which gave him the higher rank of Corresponding Advisor. He also translated, and wrote the forward for, Essay on the Properties and Effects of Vaults, an 1825 technical treatise written by Carl Friedrich Meerwein which was an important contribution to the theory of construction and the mechanics of masonry.

Pertsch mentored several students in his studio, notably Antonio Buttazzoni (1800–1848) who, upon Pertsch's recommendation, attended the Brera Academy before making his mark on the development of the city of Ljubljana. Another student was his foreman, Giovanni Righetti, whose son, the architect Giuseppe Righetti, wrote of Pertsch: "He was an artist with a deep practice in construction that gave his works that convenient solidity, without exceeding unnecessary and great expense. As far as we know, he was one of the first to introduce the most remarkable improvements in the masonry construction, and in the systems and shapes of windows and doors, for which he went up in such a reputation, that he was overpowered by technical-artistic commissions." As most of his clients were merchants and entrepreneurs, Pertsch was also skilled at not only using his designs in a cost-efficient manner, but also showing clients how methods and techniques could be profitable.*

== Personal life and death ==
Pertsch married Maddalena Vogel in 1802. They had 7 children, including the architect Nicolo Pertsch (b. 1807) who completed his father's projects after his death.

Righetti noted that, toward the end of his life, due to ill health, Pertsch became caustic and irritable. But he wrote that Pertsch was "honest, loyal, prudent, beneficial, affable and mannerous without ostentation. He listened and profited from the opinions and advice of others, knew how to distinguish abilities and protect them, find the virtuous and become friends with them."

Pertsch died in 1834 and was buried in Sant'Anna Cemetery, a cemetery of his own construction, which is now an open-air museum.

== Known works ==
- Teatro Nuovo, Trieste, 1801
- Rotonda Pancera, Trieste, 1803
- Palazzo Carciotti, Trieste, 1805
- Casa Fontana: Bank of Sicily, Trieste, 1808 (with Giovanni Righetti)
- Grand Hotel Rogaška, Rogaška Slatina, Slovenia, 1813
- Rogaška Slatina Spa Residences, Slovenia, 1818
- Tempel Pavilion, Rohitsch Sauerbrunn, Slovenia, 1818
- Lighthouse at Savudrija, Croatia, 1818
- Greek Orthodox Church of San Nicolò dei Greci, Trieste, 1820
- Sant'Anna Cemetery, Trieste, 1821
- Casa Mauroner-Stock, Trieste, 1821
- Building at Corso Italia 29, Trieste, 1822 (with Domenico Corti)
- Building at Via Diaz 17, Trieste, 1823
- Casa Steiner, Trieste, 1824
- Building at Via di Torre Bianca 41, Trieste, 1825
- Ljubljanska Cukrarna, Sugar Refinery, Ljubljana, Slovenia, 1828
- Ex Faro La Lanterna, Trieste, 1830
- Casa Recher, Trieste, 1833
- Faro del Promontore (Promontor Lighthouse), Scoglio Porer, Istria (with Pietro Nobile)
- Lighthouse: Il Molo Fratelli Bandiera, Trieste, 1833

== Note ==
- Giuseppe Righetti: Cenni storici, biografici e critici degli artisti ed ingegneri di Trieste ovvero del progresso fatto nelle arti edilizie e mestieri dalla metà del secolo XVIII fino ad oggi, L. Herrmanstorfer tipografo-editore, Trieste, 1865
