= Entry of Christ into Jerusalem (Karousos) =

Painting by Efstathios Karousos

- Η Βαϊοφόρος (Greek), Entrata di Cristo a Gerusalemme (Italian)
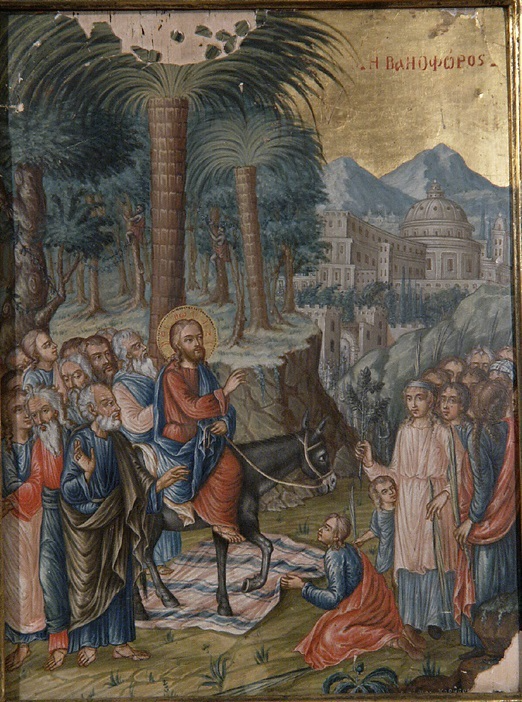
- Artist: Efstathios Karousos
- Year: 1780
- Medium: tempera on wood
- Movement: Heptanese School
- Subject: Triumphal entry into Jerusalem
- Location: Santi Pietro e Paolo dei Greci, Naples, Italy
- Owner: Hellenic Republic
- Website: Official website

Entry of Christ into Jerusalem or Veoforos is a tempera painting created by Efstathios Karousos. He was a Greek painter. He was a prominent member of the Heptanese School. He was from Kefalonia. He was active in Kefalonia, Naples, Triste and Venice. He is the second Greek painter associated with Naples the other was Belisario Corenzio. Both painters were affiliated with Santi Pietro e Paolo dei Greci. Karouso's artistic period was from 1750 to 1818. Thirty-eight of his works survived. Most of his works are in the church Santi Pietro e Paolo dei Greci.

The Triumphal entry into Jerusalem is part of the life of Jesus Christ. It was a common theme used by painters of early Christianity. Both Greek and Italian Byzantine artists pictorially represented the story. The theme was adopted by Proto-Renaissance painters. Both Giotto and Duccio presented the subject matter. During the Italian Renaissance Greek painters painted in the style called the maniera greca. The style shared attributes with Proto-Renaissance paintings. The Cretan School mixed Venetian Painting and the Proto-Renaissance style. Greek painting further evolved with the Heptanese school. Karouso blended Neapolitan painting and the Heptanese school. The work of art is part of the collection of Santi Pietro e Paolo dei Greci in Naples Italy.

== Description ==
The materials used for the work were tempera paint, gold leaf, and wood. The painter created a work blending different styles. The figure of Christ sits on a donkey blessing patrons. One of the patrons is holding a sacred palm. The donkey rests on a holy shroud. A subject kneels holding the shroud. The folds of fabric of the shroud are clearly visible. There is a mixture of figures in the foreground. The garments are traditional. The fabric exhibits folds and striations. The donkey was painted with realism. His features are demonstrative of the artist's advanced knowledge of painting. The postures and gestures of the figures clearly relay the artist's intention. The artist intended to construct figures with substance and dimensionality. There is a foreground, middle ground, and background. The traditional palm trees viewed in both Duccio and Giotto's paintings are present. There are men in the palm trees in all three works. Karouso mirrored his predecessors. The palm trees demonstrate realistic patterns and detail. In the background, the Vatican was used as a prototype for Jerusalem. The upper portions of the dome-like building are identical to the heavenly structure. The artist painted the structures with careful detail. A mountain exists behind the buildings.

== Gallery ==
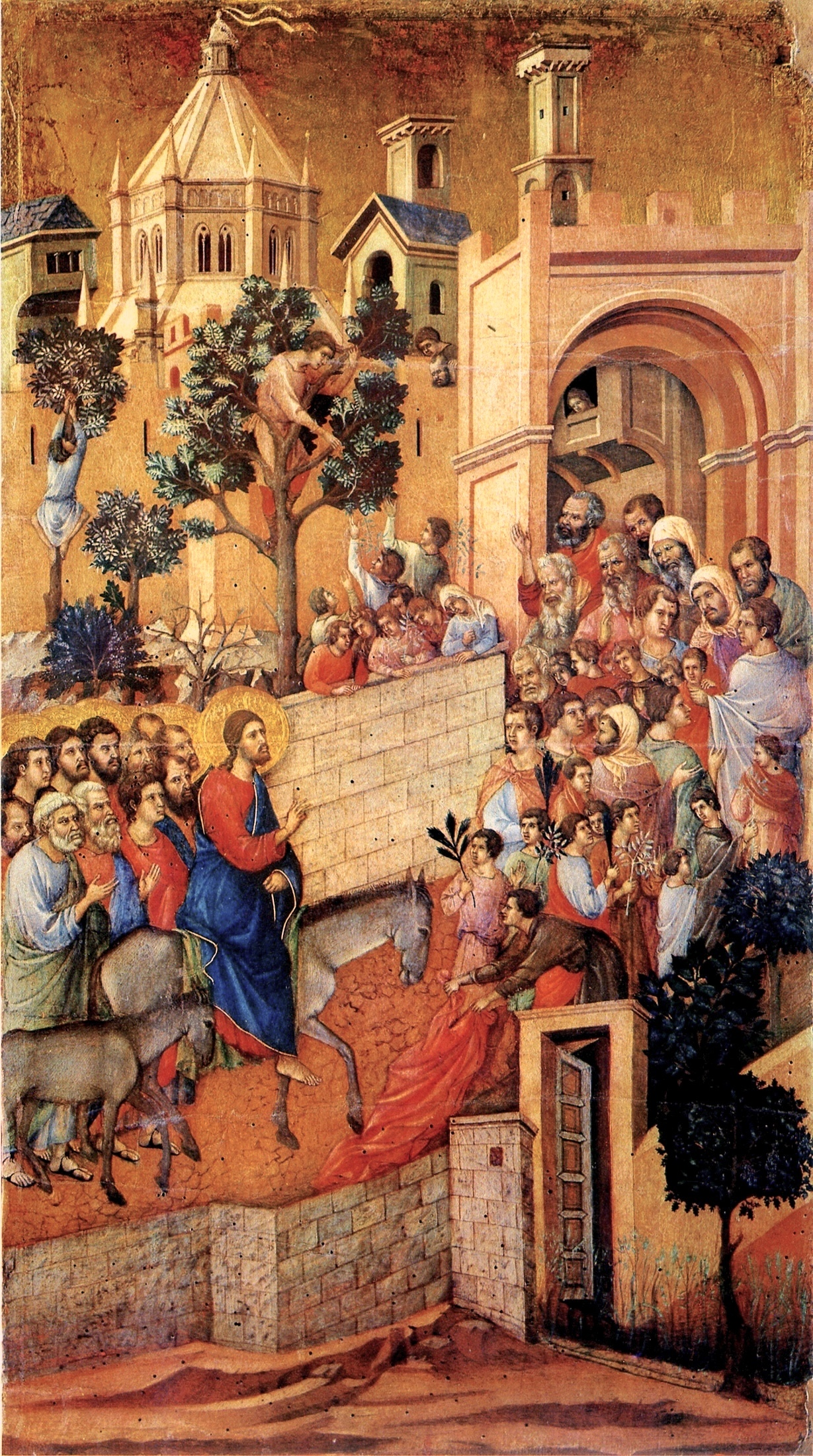
Entry of Christ into Jerusalem Duccio

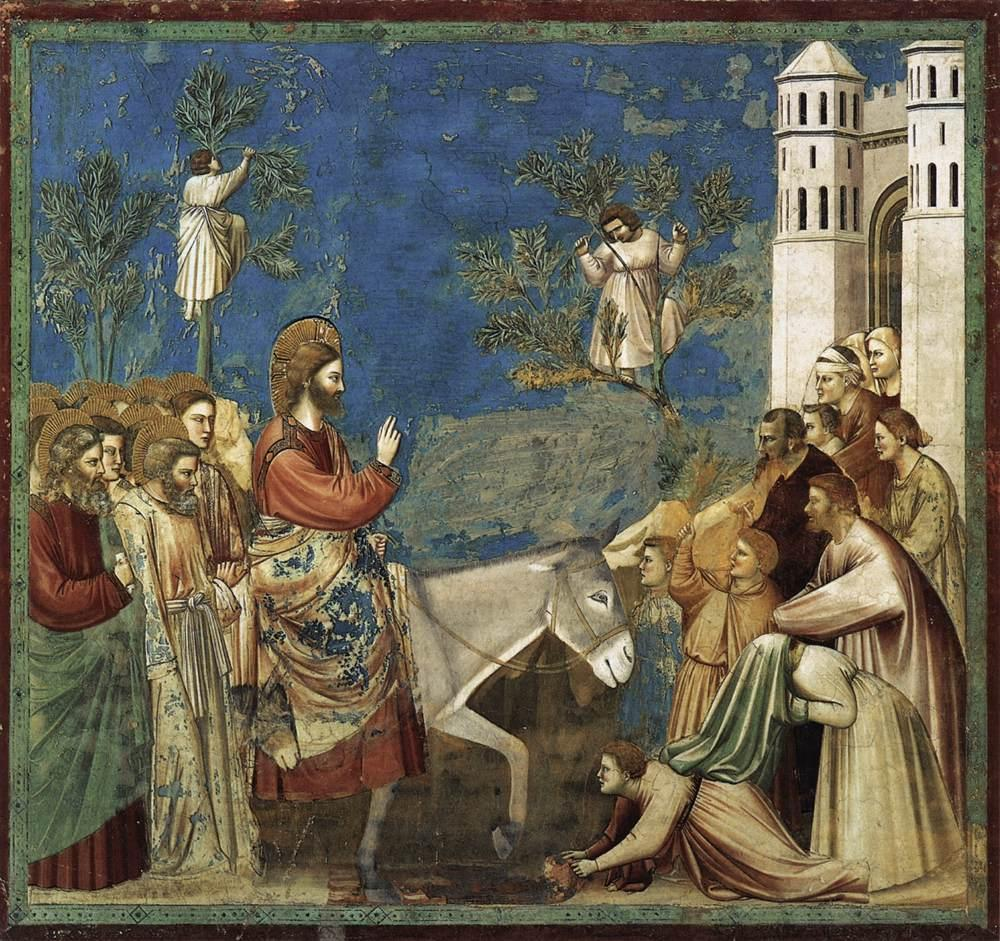
Entry of Christ into Jerusalem Giotto

== Bibliography ==
- Hatzidakis, Manolis; Drakopoulou, Evgenia (1997). Έλληνες Ζωγράφοι μετά την Άλωση (1450-1830). Τόμος 2: Καβαλλάρος - Ψαθόπουλος [Greek Painters after the Fall of Constantinople (1450-1830). Volume 2: Kavallaros - Psathopoulos]. Athens: Center for Modern Greek Studies, National Research Foundation. hdl:10442/14088. ISBN 960-7916-00-X.
