= Matthew Palaiologos Asen =

Byzantine aristocrat and official

Matthew Palaiologos Asen (Greek: Ματθαῖος Παλαιολόγος Ἀσάνης; died 29 March 1467) was a late Byzantine aristocrat and official, related to the Asen and Palaiologos dynasties.

== Life ==
He was the son of Paul Asen, and brother of Simonis and Theodora Asanina. In 1441, his sister Theodora married the Despot Demetrios Palaiologos, with whose career Matthew's destiny was intertwined. Bulgarian historian Ivan Bozhilov conjectures that Matthew must have been born in the first years of the 15th century, but before c. 1405.

Matthew first appears in September 1423, when he was sent along with his brother-in-law as an envoy to King Sigismund of Hungary. In 1442, he played an active part in Demetrios' Ottoman-assisted failed siege of Constantinople. The two were arrested on the order of Emperor John VIII, but managed to flee and were temporarily sheltered by the Genoese in Galata.

He then accompanied Demetrios to his post as governor of Lemnos, and followed him to the Despotate of the Morea after that. In 1452, he scored a victory over an Ottoman army under Turahanoğlu Ahmed Bey at Leontari, by luring it into a narrow defile. Most of the Turks fell, and Ahmed Bey himself was captured.

From 1454 he was governor of Corinth, until he surrendered the fortress to the Ottoman Sultan Mehmed II in 1458. In mid-May 1460, when Mehmed arrived at Corinth and demanded that Demetrios, his vassal, come and meet him, the latter was afraid, and sent Matthew instead. The Sultan was known to respect Matthew, but Demetrios' failure to appear enraged him, and he was not mollified by the sumptuous gifts that Matthew brought with him. Matthew was placed under arrest, and Mehmed marched against Mistras, the capital of the Morea. Demetrios surrendered the city on 29 May, putting an end to the Despotate. In recompense, Demetrios was given the town of Ainos in Thrace as an appanage, where he, Theodora, and Matthew spent the next seven years. At that point, they suddenly fell from the Sultan's favour and were dispossessed. According to Sphrantzes, admittedly a hostile source, that was because Matthew, who was in charge of the salt monopoly, allowed his subordinates to cheat the Sultan's tax officials. Demetrios, Theodora, and Matthew left Ainos for Didymoteicho, where they lived in great poverty, and where Matthew died on 29 March 1467. After that the Sultan took pity on Demetrios and his wife, allowing them to settle in Adrianople, close to their daughter Helena, and provided them with a small stipend until their death in 1470.

Matthew Palaiologos Asen was married to the unnamed daughter of the mesazon Eudaimonoioannes. He most likely had a single unnamed daughter who died shortly after him. Bozhilov theorizes that Thomas Asen Palaiologos, a Byzantine exile in the Kingdom of Naples and a "lord of Corinth" himself, was his grandson.

== Sources ==
- Bozhilov, Ivan (1994). Фамилията на Асеневци (1186–1460). Генеалогия и просопография [The Family of the Asens (1186–1460). Genealogy and Prosopography] (in Bulgarian). София: Издателство на Българската академия на науките. ISBN 954-430-264-6.
- Runciman, Steven (2009). Lost Capital of Byzantium: The History of Mistra and the Peloponnese. Tauris Parke Paperbacks. ISBN 978-1-84511-895-2.
- Trapp, Erich; Beyer, Hans-Veit; Walther, Rainer; Sturm-Schnabl, Katja; Kislinger, Ewald; Leontiadis, Ioannis; Kaplaneres, Sokrates (1976–1996). Prosopographisches Lexikon der Palaiologenzeit (in German). Vienna: Verlag der Österreichischen Akademie der Wissenschaften. ISBN 3-7001-3003-1.
