= Santi Pietro e Paolo dei Greci =

Church in Naples, Italy

Coordinates: 40.8417°N 14.2508°E

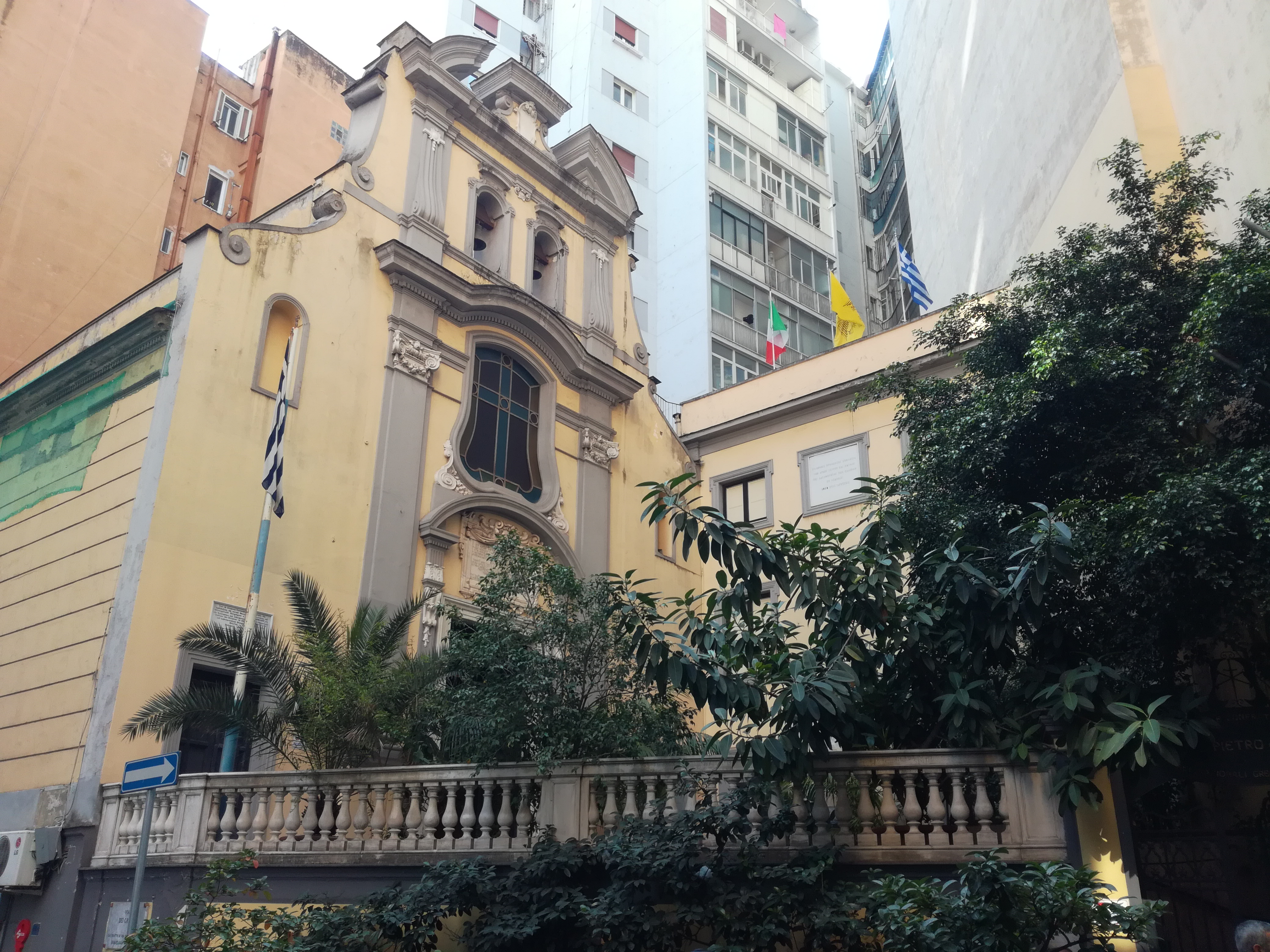
- Facade of the church

Religion
- Affiliation: Greek Orthodox
- Province: Metropolitan City of Naples
- Region: Campania
- Rite: Greek Rite

Location
- Location: Naples, Italy
- Country: Italy
- Interactive map of Santi Pietro e Paolo dei Greci

Architecture
- Groundbreaking: 1518
- Completed: 1544

Santi Pietro e Paolo dei Greci (Greek: Άγιοι Πέτρος και Παύλος των Ελλήνων, romanized: Ágioi Pétros kai Pávlos ton Ellínon, lit. 'Saints Peter and Paul of the Greeks') is a Greek Orthodox church located in the historic center of Naples, Italy, in Via San Tommaso d'Aquino 51. It was the center of the Scuola dei Greci in Naples and the Confraternity of the Greeks in Naples. Around this period there was a similar church in Venice called San Giorgio dei Greci, and there was also a Greek Brotherhood of Venice, a prominent member of which was renowned painter Belisario Corenzio. The church was initially dedicated to the Twelve Apostles. Construction of the church began at the request of one of the descendants of the Byzantine Empire, Thomas Asen Palaiologos. The church currently belongs to the Greek State.

== History ==
The initial structure was dedicated to the Twelve Apostles. The church was built in 1518 at the behest of the Knight Thomas Asen Palaiologos, a descendant of the last Byzantine imperial dynasty. The church officiated the liturgy for exiled populations of Epirus and the Morea. The institution followed the Byzantine Rite. After the Battle of Lepanto in 1571, the church served one of the largest Greek communities on Italian soil.

Thomas Asen Palaiologos sponsored the building of the church, and he also founded a chapel within the Roman Catholic church of San Giovanni Maggiore, Naples. In 1544, the Church of the Twelve Apostles was dedicated to the Greek Orthodox faith and the Byzantine Rite. By 1617, there was not enough room for the parishioners.

The famous Greek painter Belisario Corenzio was a member of the church confraternity and painted frescoes for it. During Corenzio's time, an academy for Greek girls was added to the church. In 1634, the church was re-dedicated to Saints Peter and Paul. According to the Neapolitan historian Vincenzo Meola, Corenzio had the merit of transferring the church from its "native obscurity to its nobility". Famous Italian painter Paolo de Matteis also completed some work for the church. Towards the end of the 18th century, another famous Greek painter, Efstathios Karousos, completed more artwork for the church. He painted different themes that brought fusions of the Heptanese School and Neapolitan painting. Thirty-eight of his works have survived in the church.

During the period from 1656 to 1721, the Greek Church and Confraternity engaged in a hard struggle to preserve their unique identity and the Greek character of the institution and the Eastern dogma. During the early 19th century, the church was forbidden from following the Greek Orthodox rituals or the Greek Rite. Greek Catholic priests were instituted. For half a century the church was not permitted to follow the Greek rite or Greek Orthodox rituals. By May 1866, the court of Naples returned the Church to the Orthodox Greeks and the Byzantine Rite. Archimandrite N. Katramis worked hard to restore the ancient status. By the end of the 19th century the church became the property of the Greek state and the Greek Orthodox Church.

In October 2007, the church received the visit of the Ecumenical Patriarch of Constantinople Bartholomew.

== Gallery ==
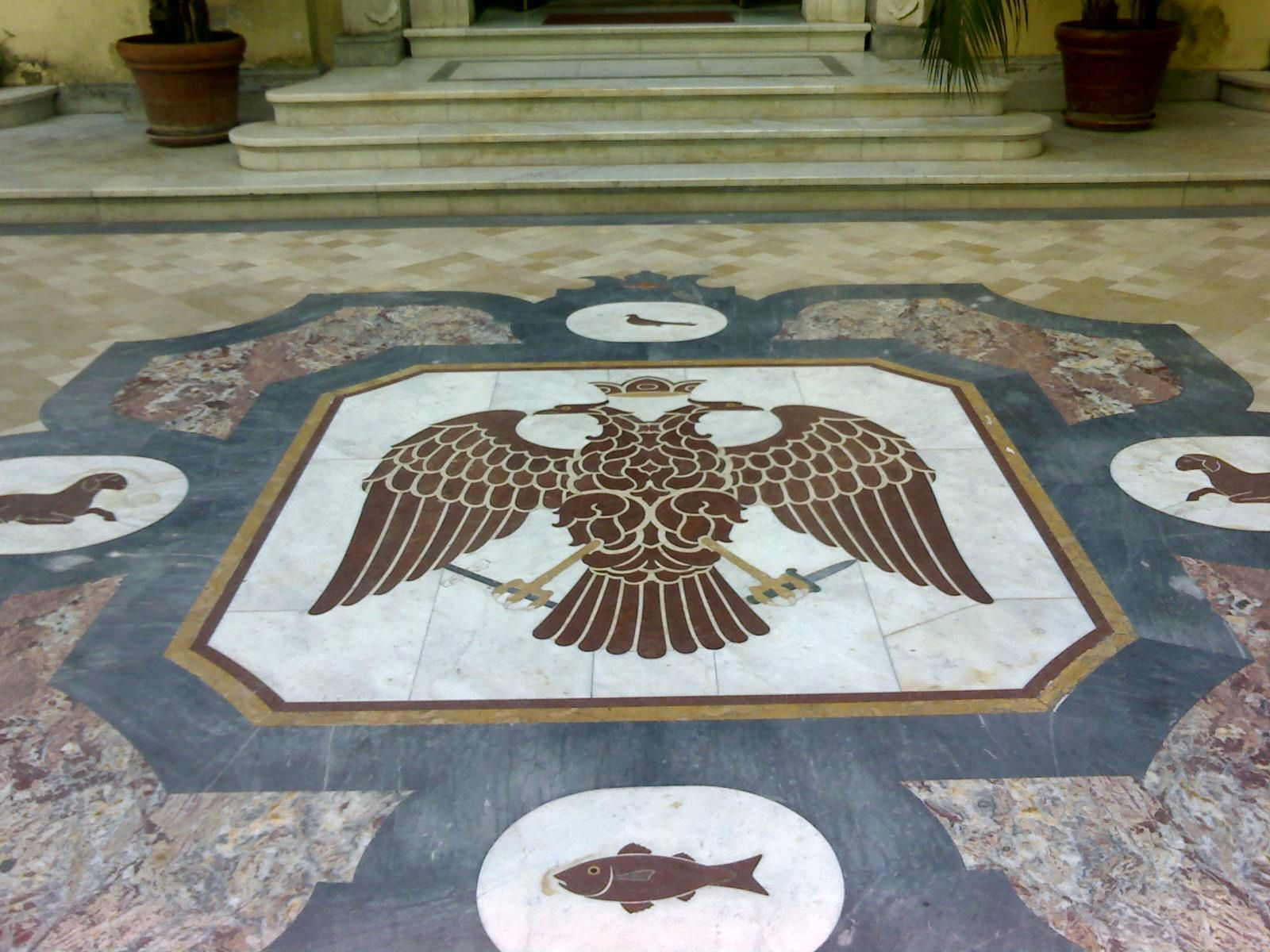
Detail of the floor of the external courtyard leading to the entrance to the church

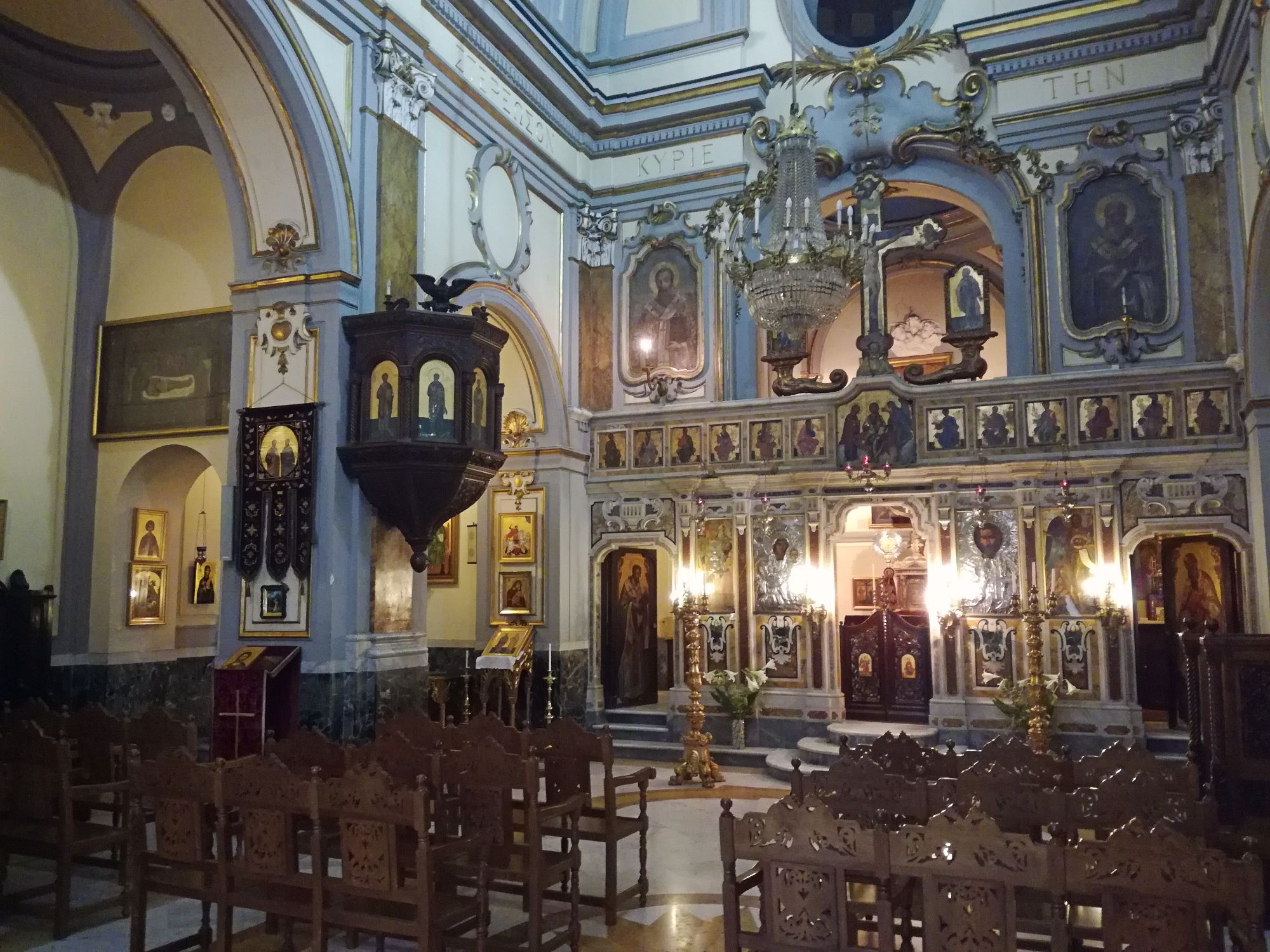
The interior

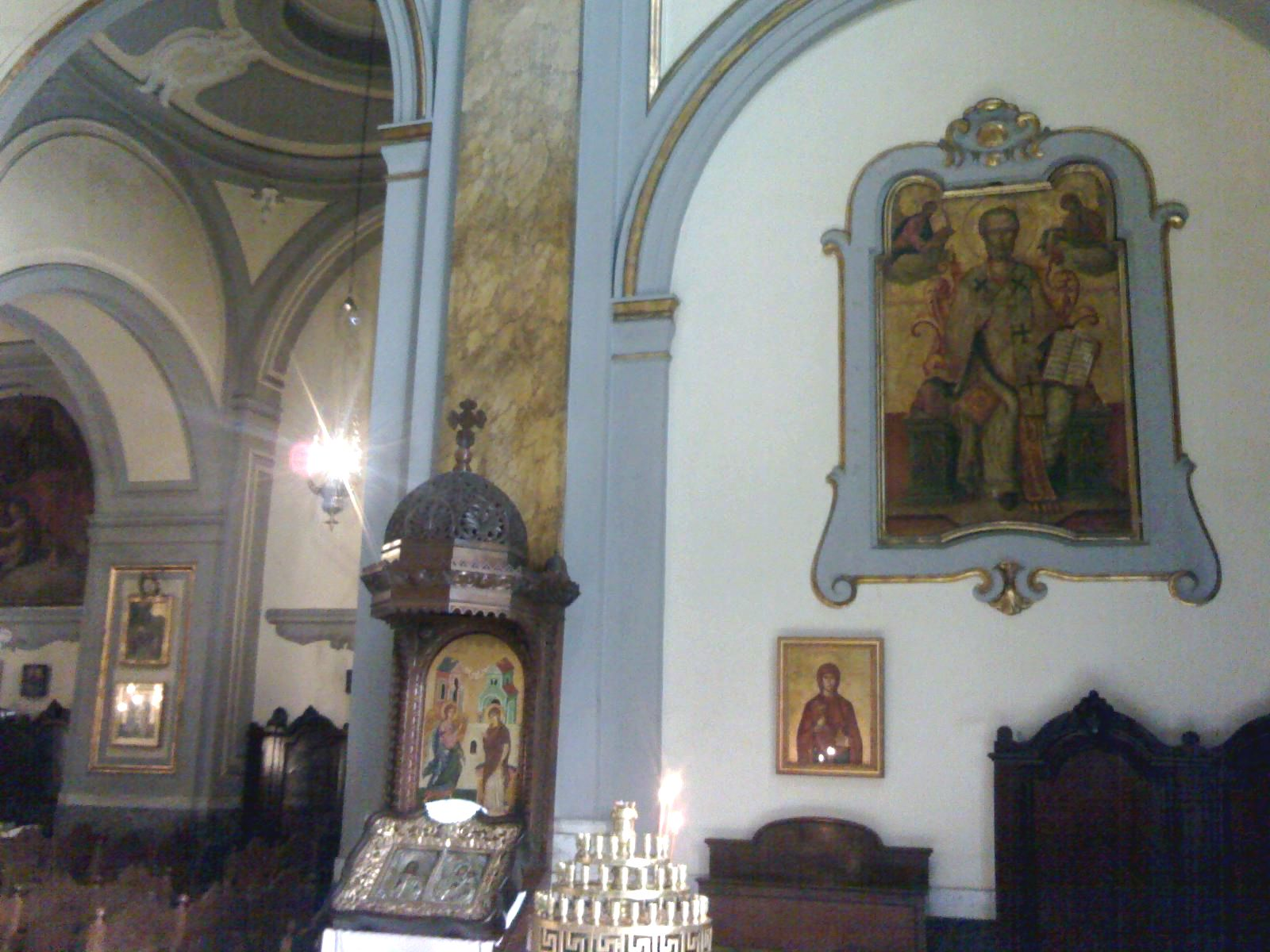
Detail of the interior

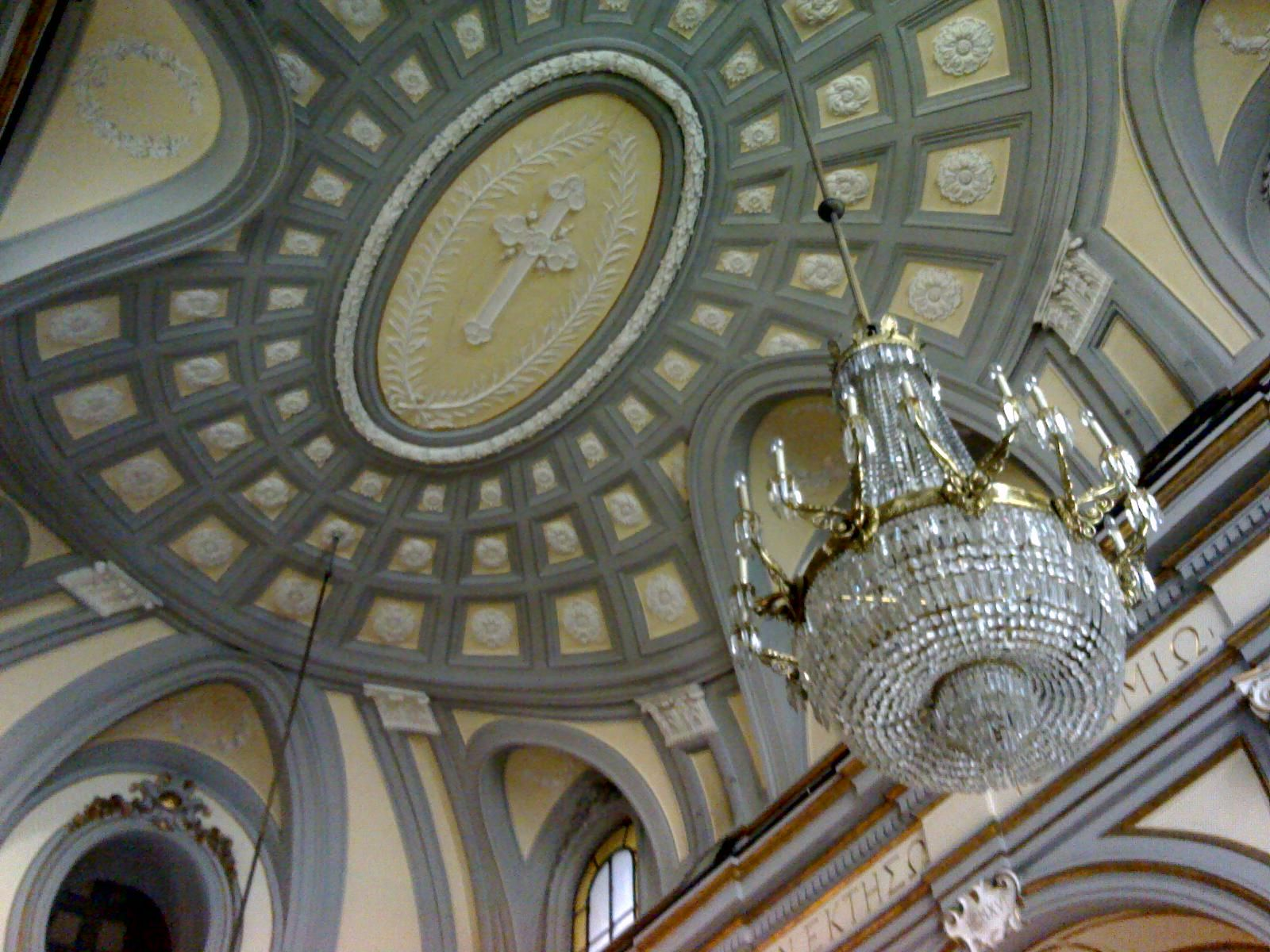
The ceiling

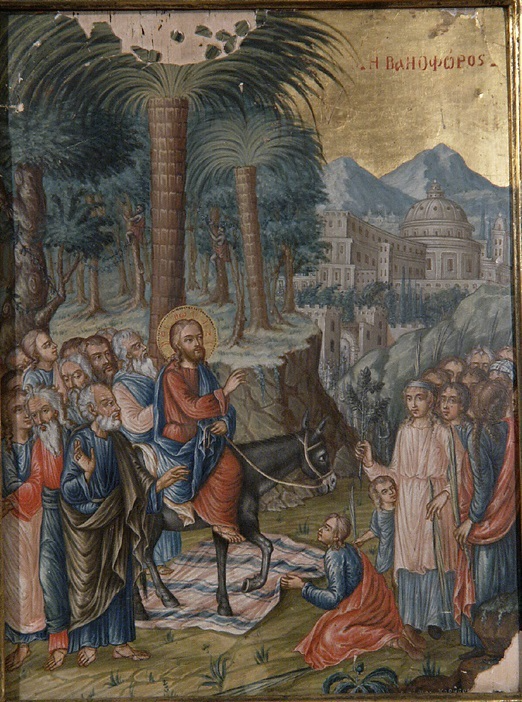
Entry of Christ into Jerusalem

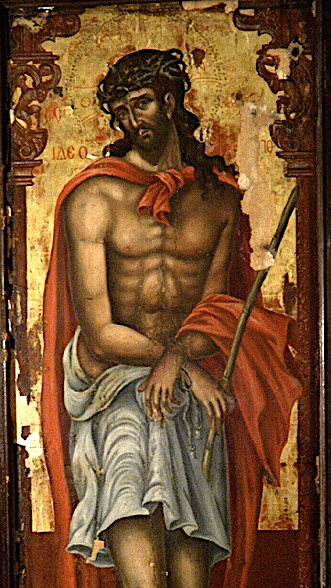
Ecce Homo

== Other Greek Churches in Italy ==
- San Giorgio dei Greci
- Greek Orthodox Church of San Nicolò dei Greci
- Chiesa Greco Ortodossa di Sant'Andrea Apostolo, Rome Italy

== See also ==
- Entry of Christ into Jerusalem (Karousos)
- Orthodox Archdiocese of Italy

== Bibliography ==
- Diamandouros, Nikiforos P. (1976). Hellenism and the First Greek War of Liberation (1821-1830) Continuity and Change Volume 156. Athens, Greece: Institute for Balkan Studies.
- Tecchio, Sebastiano (1877). Discussione del progetto di legge: Revoca di Provvedimenti Contrari alla Libertà dei Culti, Riguardanti la Chiesa e Confraternita Denvizionali Greci in Napoli [Discussion of the Bill: Revocation of Provisions Contrary to Freedom of Worship, Concerning the Church and Brotherhood of Greek Nationals in Naples.]. Naples, Italy: Italian Senate.
- Hatzidakis, Manolis; Drakopoulou, Evgenia (1997). Έλληνες Ζωγράφοι μετά την Άλωση (1450-1830) Τόμος 2: Καβαλλάρος - Ψαθόπουλος [Greek Painters after the Fall of Constantinople (1450-1830). Volume 2: Kavallaros - Psathopoulos]. Athens: Center for Modern Greek Studies, National Research Foundation. hdl:10442/14088. ISBN 960-7916-00-X.
- Gardner, Wells (1877). The Foreign Church Chronicle and Review Volume 1. London, UK: Williams & Norgate. p. 95.
- Ruffini, Francesco (1912). Religious Liberty. New York, NY: Williams & Norgate.
