= Efstathios Karousos =

Greek painter (died 1818)

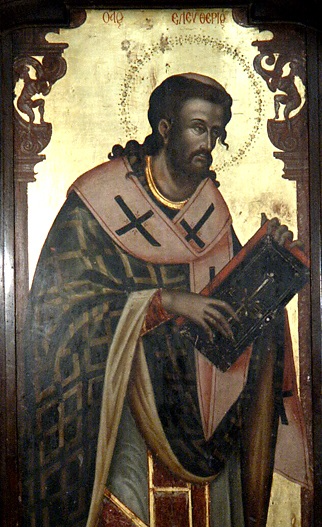
- Saint Eleftherios
- Born: 1735; Cephalonia, Greece
- Died: 1818 (aged 82–83); Venice, Italy
- Known for: Painter
- Movement: Heptanese School; Neoclassicism; Romanticism

Efstathios Karousos (Greek: Ευστάθιος Καρούσος; 1735/38 – 1818) also known as Eustathios Karousos, Efstathio Karousou (Greek: Ευστάθιο Καρουσου, Eustacchio Caruso and Eustachio Caruso. He was a Greek painter and writer. He is one of the elite painters from the island of Cephalonia. Other painters from the same region around the same period included Andreas Karantinos and Gerasimos Pitsamanos. He was active in Cephalonia, Naples, Trieste, and other parts of Italy. Some of his paintings have survived. He is one of few Greek painters to have worked and lived outside of the Venetian Empire. Both Karousos and Belisario Corenzio were active painters in Naples. Some of his work emulated the typical Heptanese School. According to the Institute of Neohellenic Research, forty-nine of his works survived. Thirty-eight of his works are in the church Santi Pietro e Paolo dei Greci.

== History ==
Efstathios was born in Cephalonia in the middle of the 18th century. Not much is known about his life. Luckily historians have a trail of artwork starting in the year 1750. He painted Saint Dionysius. By the year 1756, he migrated to Naples. He painted icons and frescos for Santi Pietro e Paolo dei Greci. Famous Greek painter Belisario Corenzio also painted for the same church. He was also a member of the Greek community in Naples. Efstathios's artwork in the church ranges from 1766 to 1795. In 1767, he painted some works in an Orthodox Church in the village of Villa Badessa in the region of Abruzzo. Several years later, he wrote two books.

In 1775, Efstathios published Sonetti in Morte di Giorgio Corafan (Sonnets of Death by Giorgio Corafan) in Naples. His second book Sen Timenti di un Concittadino Delle Isole Ionie ai Suoi Con Cittadini (Feelings of a citizen of the Ionian Islands to his fellow citizens) was published in Milan around 1802. Karousos eventually went to Trieste. Famous painter Spyridon Sperantzas was active in the region.

Spyridon Sperantzas was associated with the Greek Orthodox Church of San Nicolò dei Greci in Trieste 1784-1795. His family settled in the region. They became extremely wealthy and popular. Both his son Micheal and Grandson Spyridon were artists. The family painted for the Greek church and maintained the artwork. Michael Sperantzas demanded 4000 fiorini to decorate the ceiling of the church. San Nicolò dei Greci was forced to hire an Italian painter named Giacomo Granziosi. He finished the work for half the price. His helper was Efstathios Karousos. Efstathios's final work was the Relic of a Saint Spyridon. It was finished in 1818. The piece is in the church San Biagio, Venice. He died in Venice.

Karousos's work was so unique eventually his style broke away from contemporary Heptanese art of the Ionian Islands. The painter drew from the art of Naples and was heavily influenced by the Italian style. Belisario Corenzio completed some work for the church Santi Pietro e Paolo dei Greci and Karousos was exposed to it. Karousos in turn influenced Neapolitan art. Countless Italian and Greek painters were exposed to his work and adapted his style. Some of his signature poems were Ποίημα του ταπεινού καί ευσεβούς δούλου τοΰ Θεού Ευσταθίου τού Καρούσου τού έκ Κεφαλληνίας ορμώμενου (Poem of the humble and pious servant of God Efstathios of Karousos from Cephalonia) and Ευστάθιος Καροΰσος Κεφαλληνιεύς έν Νεαπόλει έποίησε (Efstathios Karousos of Cephalonia and Naples).

== Gallery ==
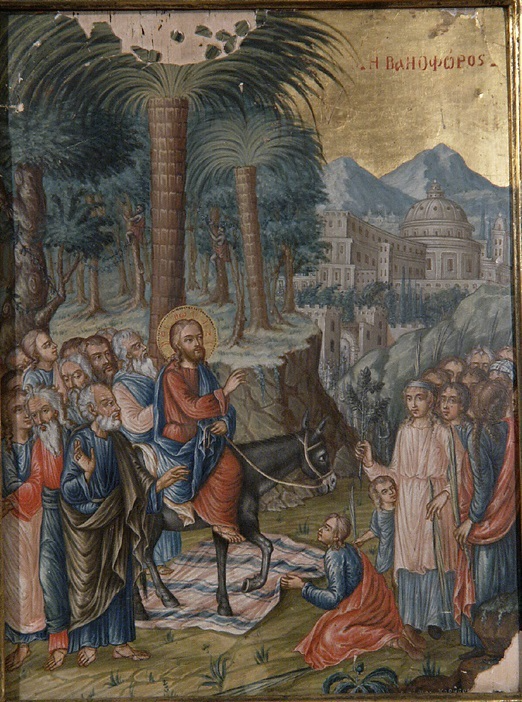
Entry of Christ into Jerusalem

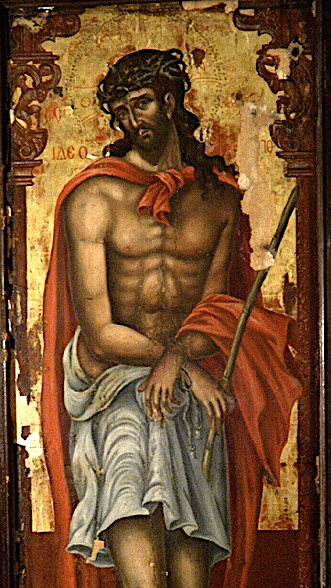
Eede O Anthropos (Behold the man) or (Ecce homo)

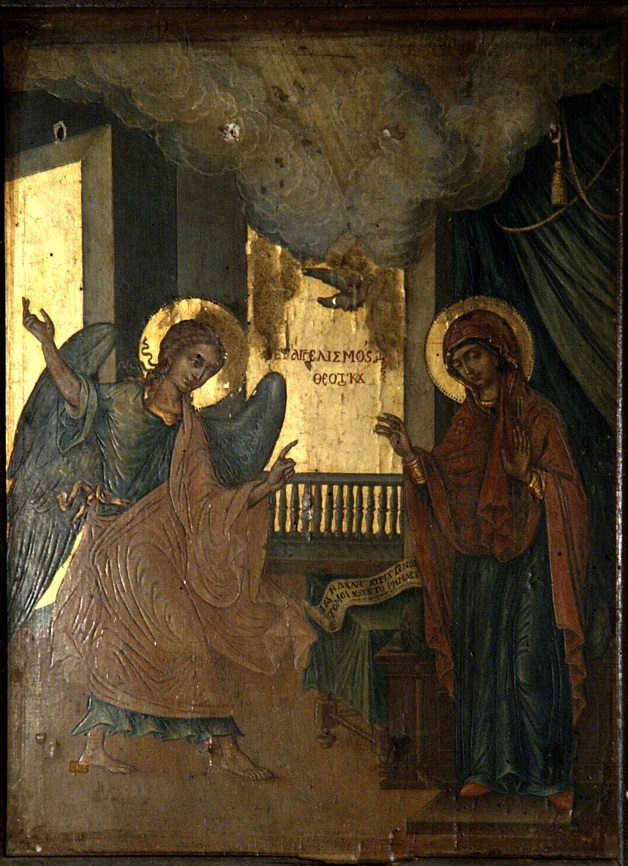
Annunciation

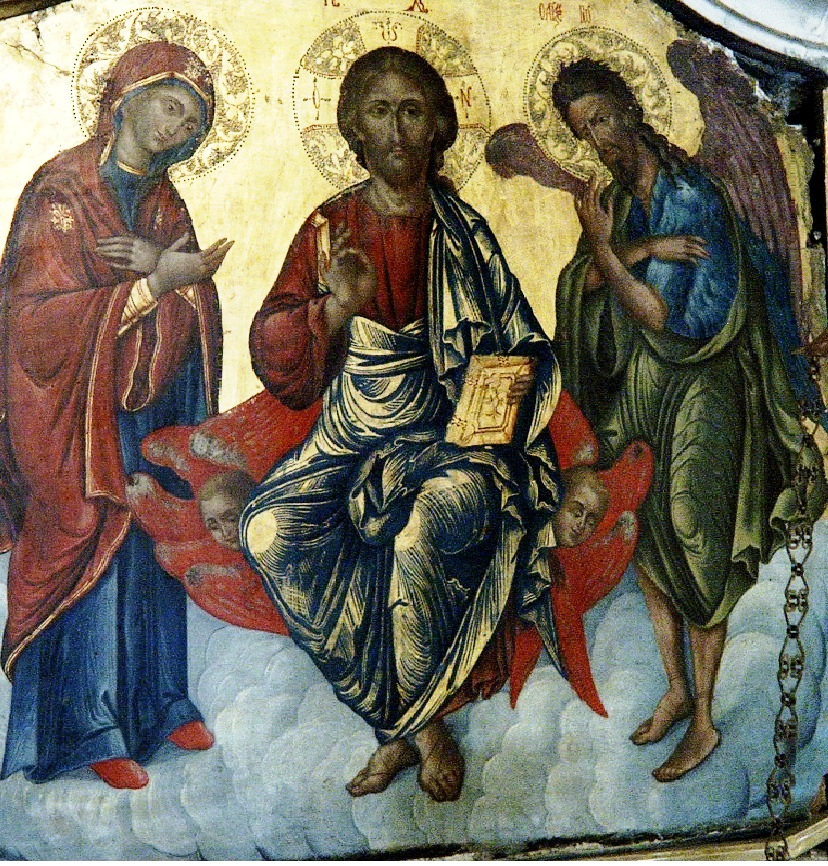
Deesis
Edited in October 2021

== Notable works ==
- ΘΚ and Anna, 1761 Collection of Tsakiroglou, Estia Nea Smyrni, Athens, Greece
- Annunciation of ΘΚ 1781 Collection of Tsakiroglou, Estia Nea Smyrni, Athens, Greece
- Eede O Anthropos (Ecce homo) Byzantine and Christian Museum Athens Greece
- Entry of Christ into Jerusalem Santi Pietro e Paolo dei Greci Naples, Italy

== Bibliography ==
- Hatzidakis, Manolis (1987). Greek painters after the fall (1450-1830) Volume A. Athens, GR: Center for Modern Greek Studies E.I.E.
- Hatzidakis, Manolis & Drakopoulou, Eugenia (1997). Greek painters after the fall (1450-1830) Volume B. Athens, GR: Center for Modern Greek Studies E.I.E.
- Drakopoulou, Eugenia (2010). Greek painters after the fall (1450-1830) Volume C. Athens, GR: Center for Modern Greek Studies E.I.E.
