= Thomas Asen Palaiologos =

Byzantine exile in the Kingdom of Naples

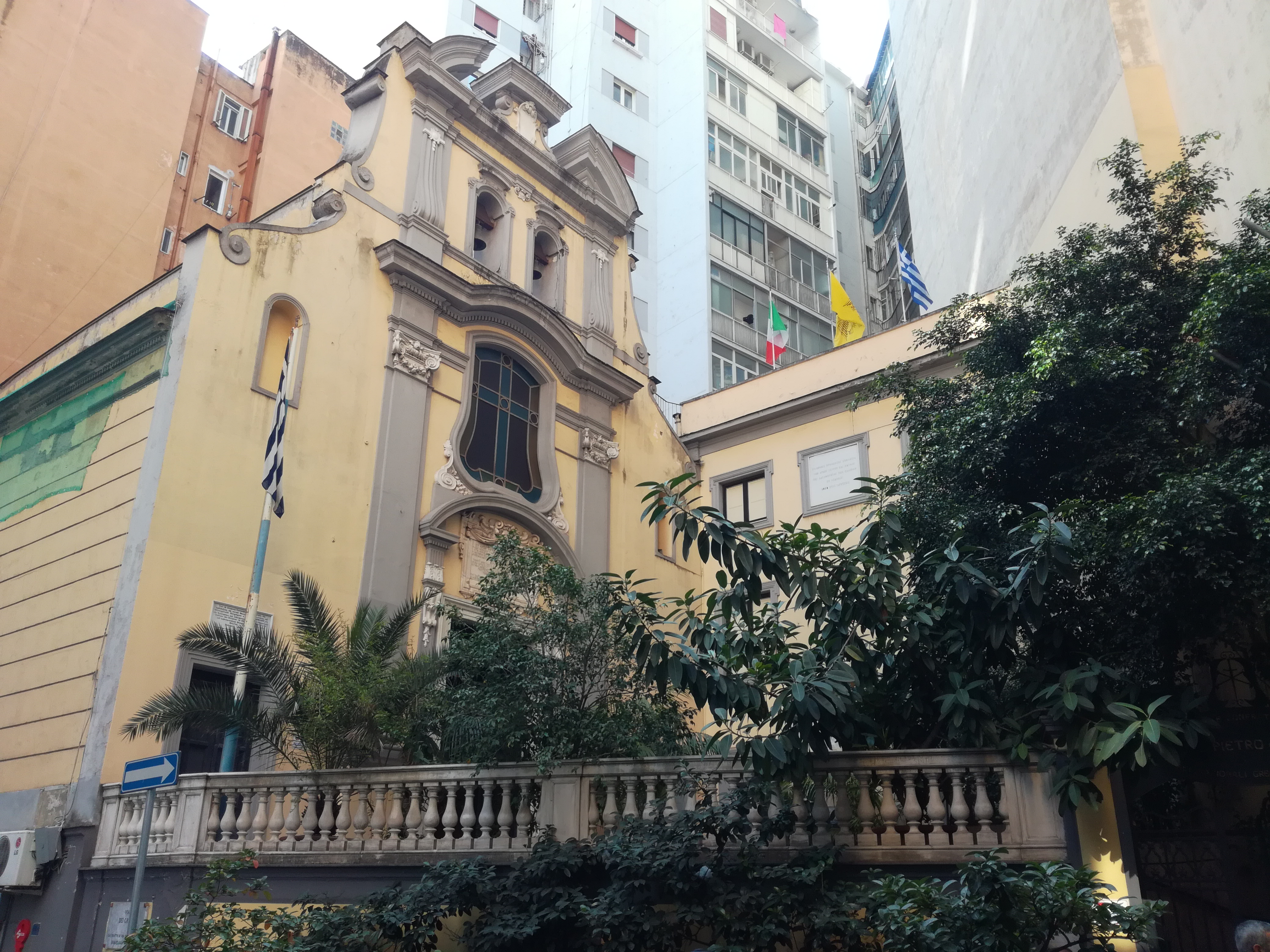
Modern appearance of the Church of Saints Peter and Paul of the Greeks in Naples, whose construction Thomas Asen Palaiologos financed

Thomas Asen Palaiologos (Latin: Thomas Assanus Paleologus, Greek: Θωμάς Ασάνης Παλαιολόγος; 15th century–1523?) was a prominent Byzantine exile in the Kingdom of Naples in the early 16th century. A descendant of two imperial dynasties, the Palaiologoi of Byzantium and the Asens of Bulgaria, Thomas Asen Palaiologos was active in the anti-Ottoman struggles of Greece. Before 1506, he resettled in Italy and was the donor for the construction of an Eastern Orthodox church in Naples.

== Biography ==
A papal bull of Pope Paul III from 1544 refers to him as "the former king of Corinth in the Morea" and as "the lord of Corinth". Thus, Bulgarian historian Ivan Bozhilov considers it most likely that he was a grandson of Matthew Palaiologos Asen, brother-in-law to the despot of Morea Demetrios Palaiologos (r. 1436–1460). Matthew Asen was a lord of Corinth and ruler of Acrocorinth from 1454 to 1458, when the fortress was conquered by the Ottomans.

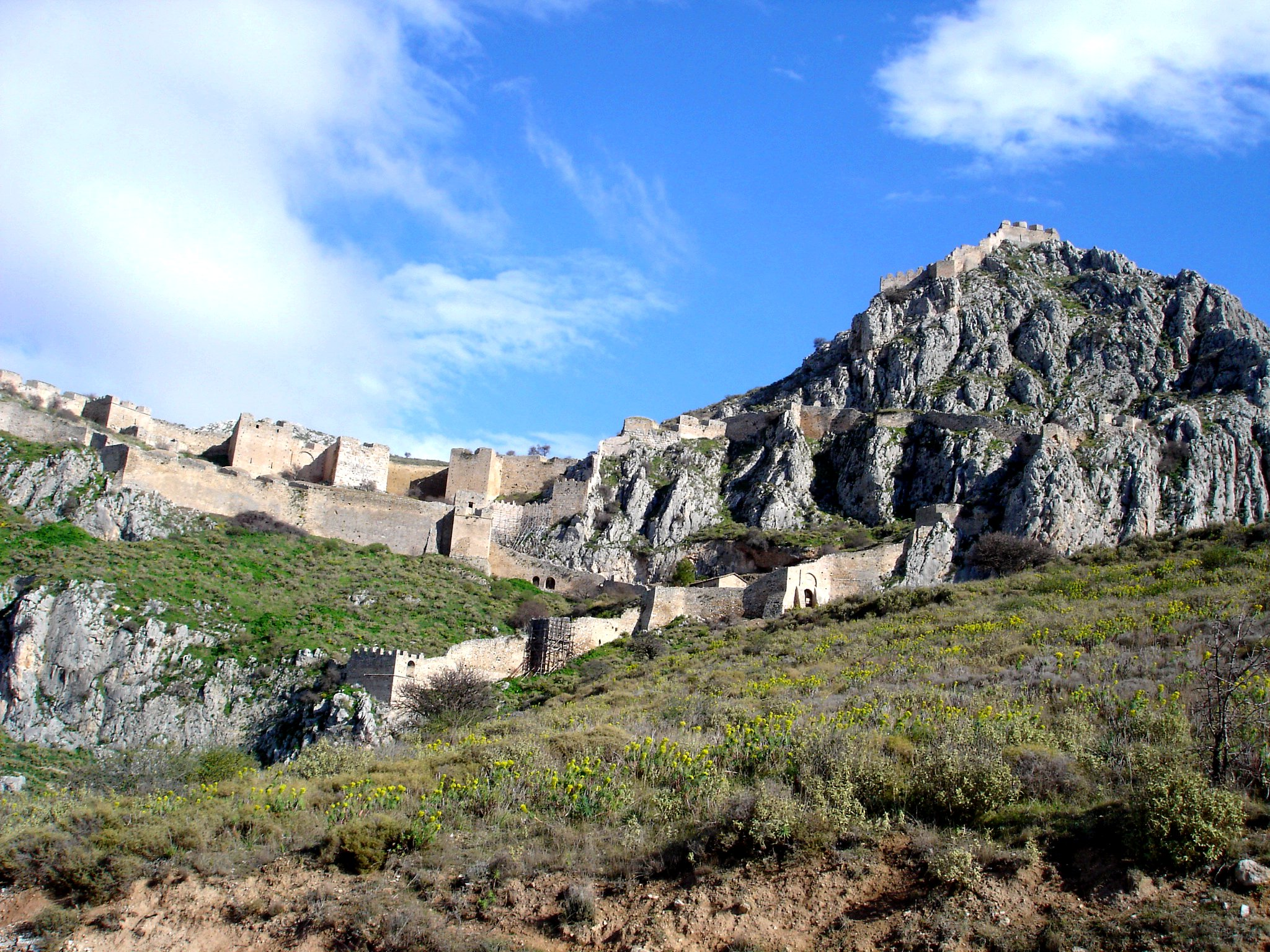
The walls of Acrocorinth, Thomas Asen Palaiologos' ancestral fortress

Thomas Asen Palaiologos organized an anti-Ottoman rebellion in Greece at an unknown time and place. The failure of the rebellion was likely the concrete reason to resettle to Italy, and he was resident in Calabria by 1506. There, he was economically active and had received privileges from the King of Naples, Ferdinand III.

In Naples, Thomas Asen Palaiologos was the main donor (ktetor) for the construction of the city's first Eastern Orthodox church, the Church of Saints Peter and Paul of the Greeks (Chiesa dei Santi Pietro e Paolo dei Greci). The church, which was commonly referred to as the "Palaiologian chapel", was an important hub of the community of Byzantine exiles in Naples. The church lies on a high point in the neighbourhood of San Giuseppe and is the sole survivor of the neighbourhood's former "Alley of the Greeks". Built in 1518 and reconstructed multiple times, it is one of the oldest churches of the Byzantine diaspora in the West after the Fall of Constantinople in 1453.

The date of Thomas Asen Palaiologos' death is unclear, though 1523 is given in one source. There are indications that he had no children, as the rights to the church were inherited by his niece Maria Asanina Palaiologina (Bulgarian: Мария Асенина Палеологина), daughter of his brother George Asen (Bulgarian: Георги Асен), wife of Rali (Raul), mother of Pietro Rali (?-1558, Napoli) and grandmother of neapolitan noblewoman Victoria Rali Asen (Bulgarian: Виктория Ралина Асенина).
