= Greek Orthodox Church of San Nicolò dei Greci =

Greek Orthodox Church
- Chiesa di San Nicolò e della Santissima Trinità
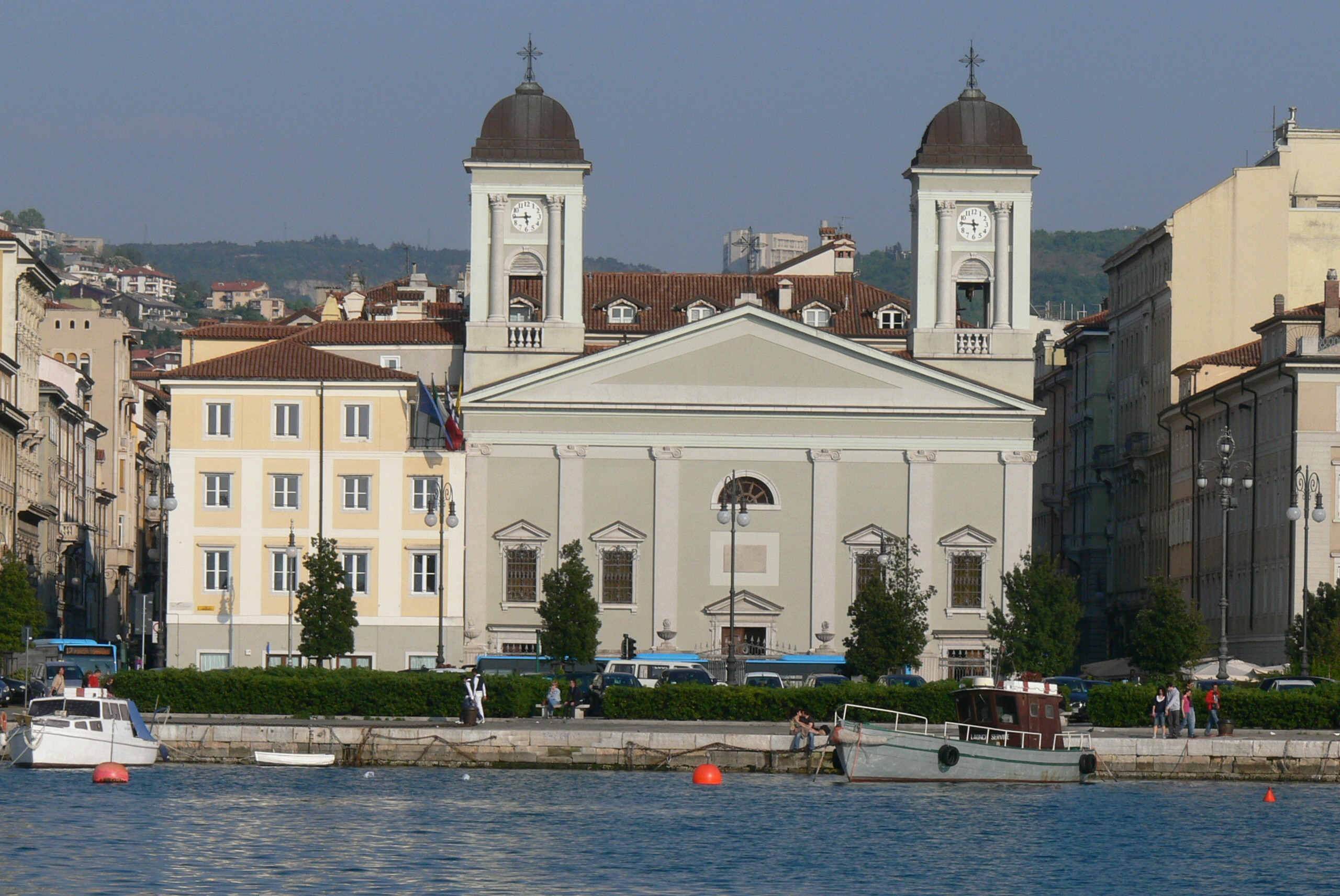
- Greek Orthodox Church in Trieste
- Greek Orthodox Church
- 45.6515800°N 13.7693000°E
- Country: Italy
- Denomination: Greek Orthodox

Architecture
- Style: Byzantine
- Completed: 1787

The Greek Orthodox Church of San Nicolò dei Greci, Trieste, Italy, is a historical Greek Orthodox Church built in 1784-1787 and re designed by architect Matteo Pertsch. The building is also known as the Greek Orthodox Church of San Nicholas and Most Holy Trinity. The iconostasis was painted by Spyridon Sperantzas

== Description ==
The church is made up of a single-nave building with a basilica skeleton.

The interior of the church is dominated by a richly golden and silver iconostasis which, as is usual in oriental churches, separates the choir from the nave. Another famous painter associated with the church was Efstathios Karousos.

== Gallery ==
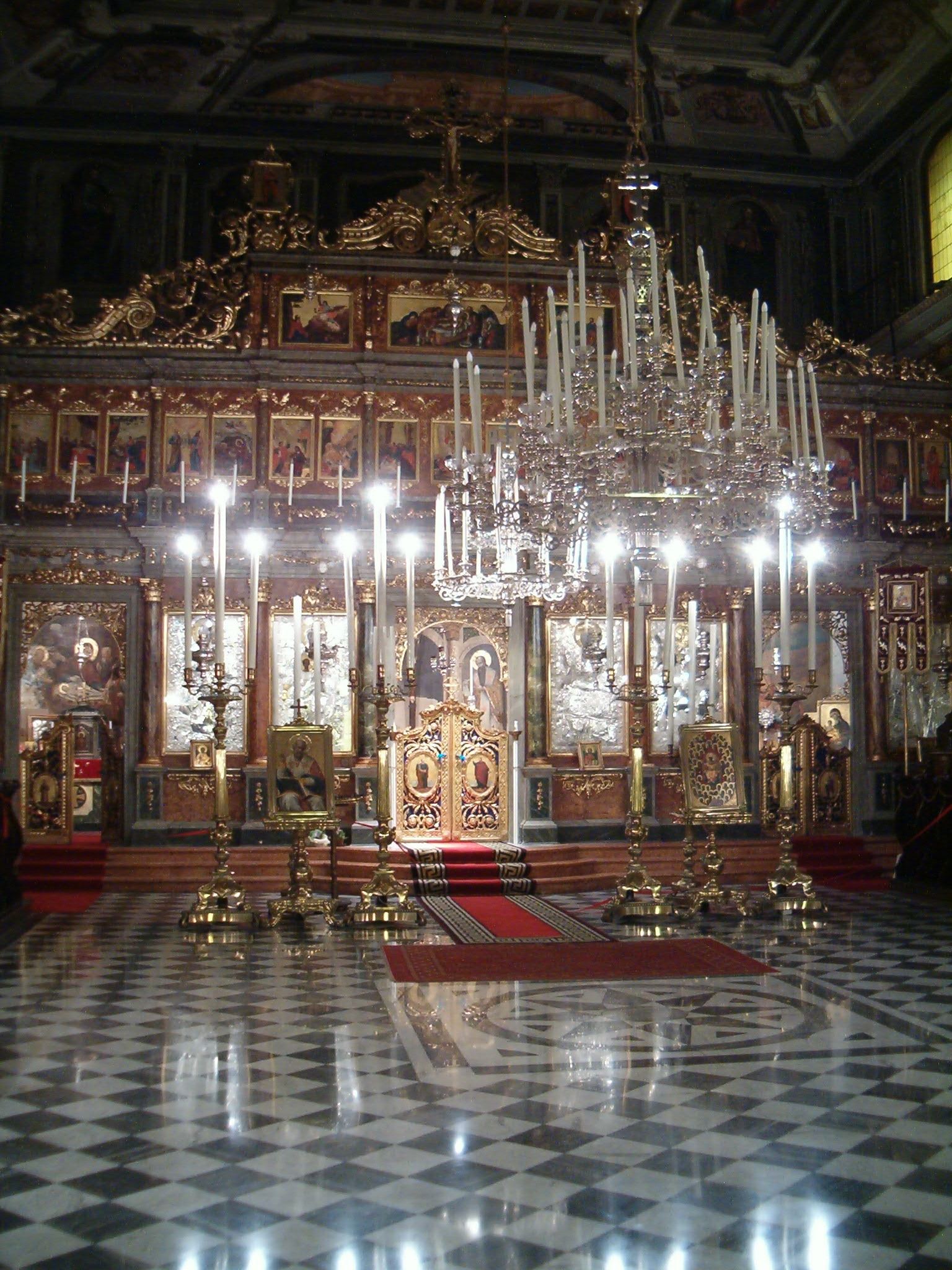
Interior of the church
