= Demetrios Komnenos Eudaimonoioannes =

Byzantine Greek official

Demetrios Komnenos Eudaimonoioannes (Greek: Δημήτριος Κομνηνός Εὺδαιμονοϊωάννης) was a Byzantine Greek official in Serres in the 1360s.

He is attested in documents as the kephale (governor) of Serres in 1360, and as holding the post of katholikos krites (senior judge of appeals) in the city in 1365–66. Although the city was part of the Serbian Empire at the time, as a recently conquered former Byzantine land, its administration was carried out in the Byzantine pattern and largely entrusted to local Greeks.

== Sources ==
- Charalambakis, Pantelis (2010). "Οι Δαιμονοϊωάννηδες (13ος-17ος αἰ.)". Λακωνικαί Σπουδαί: Περιοδικόν σύγγραμμα της Εταιρείας Λακωνικών Σπουδών (in Greek). XIX. Athens: Society for Laconian Studies: 173–218. ISSN 1105-0349.
- Trapp, Erich; Beyer, Hans-Veit; Walther, Rainer; Sturm-Schnabl, Katja; Kislinger, Ewald; Leontiadis, Ioannis; Kaplaneres, Sokrates (1976–1996). Prosopographisches Lexikon der Palaiologenzeit (in German). Vienna: Verlag der Österreichischen Akademie der Wissenschaften. ISBN 3-7001-3003-1.
