= Ulrich of Richenthal =

Chronicler of the Council of Constance

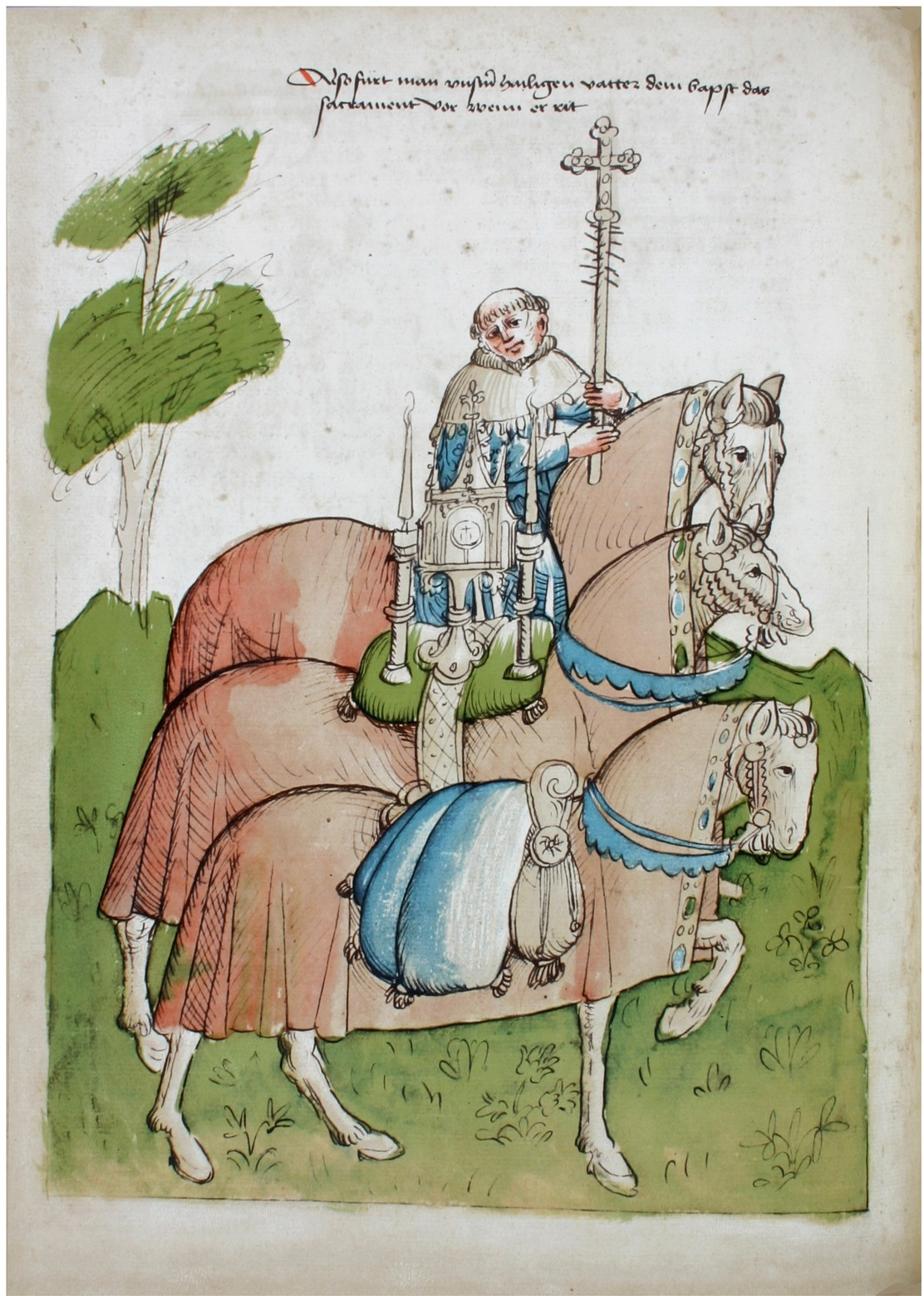
Image from the Chronicle of the Council of Constance by Ulrich of Richenthal

Ulrich of Richenthal (died c. 1438) was a chronicler of the Council of Constance.

Ulrich was a citizen of Konstanz (Constance). He was a landowner and a layman, perhaps a son of the town clerk of Constance, Johannes Richenthal, who lived in the second half of the fourteenth century. During the session of the Ecumenical Council of Constance, Ulrich frequently came into connection with the fathers assembled. He met the papal delegates who had to provide quarters for the members of the council. He was employed in business matters by princes who were present in the city during the council, and a bishop lived in his house. Ulrich followed the council, the great events that took place in it, the festivities, and all the celebrations of which his native town was the theatre. He wrote in the German dialect of Konstanz an exact and careful account of all, introducing much statistical matter. This chronicle is preserved in several manuscripts, of which one at St. Petersburg is in Latin. The manuscripts contain coats-of-arms and other historically valuable illustrations.
