= List of lighthouses in Croatia =

Location of lighthouses within Croatia - number refers to Map Ref

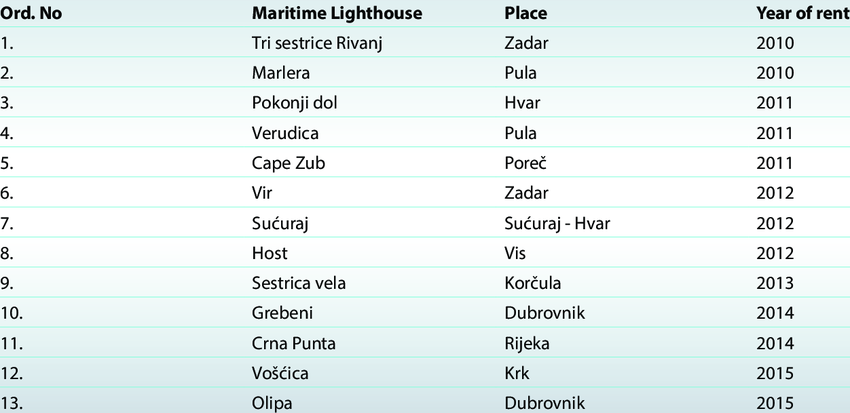
Information about lighthouses in Croatia

This is a list of lighthouses in Croatia. They are located both on the mainland and on the numerous Croatian islands in the Adriatic. The principal lights and lighthouses of Croatia are operated and maintained by Plovput, a state owned company. Plovput lists 46 separate lighthouses, although there are numerous additional towers, lights and beacons.

== Lighthouses ==
| Name | Image | Location Coordinates | Year built | Tower Height | Focal Height | Range | Map Ref |
|---|---|---|---|---|---|---|---|
| Babac Lighthouse | | Islet near Pasman; 43.956727°N 15.394834°E | 1874 | 6 m (20 ft) | 7 m (23 ft) | 10 nmi (19 km) | 1 |
| Blitvenica Lighthouse | | Islet near Žirje; 43.625185°N 15.574475°E | 1872 | 21 m (69 ft) | 38 m (125 ft) | 24 nmi (44 km) | 2 |
| Crna Punta Lighthouse | | Koromacno; 44.957104°N 14.145592°E | 1873 | 9 m (30 ft) | 15 m (49 ft) | 10 nmi (19 km) | 3 |
| Glavat Lighthouse | | Islet near Lastovo; 42.765666°N 17.145860°E | 1884 | 19 m (62 ft) | 45 m (148 ft) | 22 nmi (41 km) | 4 |
| Grebeni Lighthouse | | Islet near Dubrovnik; 42.651546°N 18.047887°E | 1872 | 13 m (43 ft) | 27 m (89 ft) | 10 nmi (19 km) | 5 |
| Grujica Lighthouse | | Islet near Losinj; 44.409524°N 14.568976°E | 1873 | 15 m (49 ft) | 17 m (56 ft) | 10 nmi (19 km) | 6 |
| Host Lighthouse | | Vis; 43.076306°N 16.204649°E | 1873 | 11 m (36 ft) | 21 m (69 ft) | 8 nmi (15 km) | 7 |
| Jadrija Lighthouse | | Srima; 43.721606°N 15.850200°E | 1871 | 11 m (36 ft) | 12 m (39 ft) | 9 nmi (17 km) | 8 |
| Marlera Lighthouse | | Medulin; 44.803451°N 14.001807°E | 1883 | 9 m (30 ft) | 21 m (69 ft) | 9 nmi (17 km) | 9 |
| Mlaka Lighthouse | | Rijeka; 45.333655°N 14.420183°E | 1878/1920 | 38 m (125 ft) | 39 m (128 ft) | 15 nmi (28 km) | 10 |
| Mulo Lighthouse | | Primošten; 43.514525°N 15.918642°E | 1873 | 18 m (59 ft) | 23 m (75 ft) | 21 nmi (39 km) | 11 |
| Murvica Lighthouse | | Islet Murvica; 43.466931°N 16.056591°E | 1896 | 7 m (23 ft) | 15 m (49 ft) | 7 nmi (13 km) | 12 |
| Oštri Rat Lighthouse | | Zadar; 44.13005°N 15.20429°E | 1869 | 14 m (46 ft) | 14 m (46 ft) | 15 nmi (28 km) | 13 |
| Oštro Kraljevica Lighthouse | | Kraljevica; 45.273078°N 14.560205°E | 1872 | 15 m (49 ft) | 15 m (49 ft) | 8 nmi (15 km) | 14 |
| Palagruža Lighthouse | | Palagruža; 42.392665°N 16.255646°E | 1875 | 23 m (75 ft) | 110 m (361 ft) | 26 nmi (48 km) | 15 |
| Peneda Lighthouse | | Istria; 44.888063°N 13.753139°E | 1877 | 15 m (49 ft) | 20 m (66 ft) | 11 nmi (20 km) | 16 |
| Plocica Lighthouse | | Islet Plocica; 43.030560°N 16.816434°E | 1887 | 13 m (43 ft) | 25 m (82 ft) | 10 nmi (19 km) | 17 |
| Pokonji Dol Lighthouse | | Pokonji Dol; 43.156667°N 16.452778°E | 1872 | 15 m (49 ft) | 20 m (66 ft) | 10 nmi (19 km) | 18 |
| Pomorac Lighthouse | | Split; 43.500752°N 16.443057°E | 1958 | 38 m (125 ft) | 54 m (177 ft) | 10 nmi (19 km) | 19 |
| Porer Lighthouse | | Istria; 44.758122°N 13.890938°E | 1833 | 31 m (102 ft) | 35 m (115 ft) | 25 nmi (46 km) | 20 |
| Prestenice Lighthouse | | Cres; 45.120172°N 14.272875°E | 1872 | 13 m (43 ft) | 17 m (56 ft) | 10 nmi (19 km) | 21 |
| Prišnjak Lighthouse | | Murter; 43.825464°N 15.558926°E | 1886 | 15 m (49 ft) | 19 m (62 ft) | 9 nmi (17 km) | 22 |
| Ražanj Lighthouse | | Milna; 43.319932°N 16.408652°E | 1875 | 14 m (46 ft) | 17 m (56 ft) | 13 nmi (24 km) | 23 |
| Savudrija Lighthouse | | Savudrija; 45.489966°N 13.49095°E | 1818 | 29 m (95 ft) | 36 m (118 ft) | 30 nmi (56 km) | 24 |
| Sestrica vela (Korcula) Lighthouse | | Pelješac channel 42.962517°N 17.207811°E | 1871 | 15 m (49 ft) | 18 m (59 ft) | 11 nmi (20 km) | 25 |
| Sestrica vela (Tajer) Lighthouse | | Dugi Otok; 43.853067°N 15.205293°E | 1876 | 26 m (85 ft) | 47 m (154 ft) | 20 nmi (37 km) | 26 |
| Split Breakwater | | Split; 43.853067°N 15.205293°E | 1888 | 10 m (33 ft) | 11 m (36 ft) | 10 nmi (19 km) | 27 |
| Stončica Lighthouse | | Vis; 43.072332°N 16.254404°E | 1866 | 28 m (92 ft) | 38 m (125 ft) | 30 nmi (56 km) | 28 |
| Stražica Lighthouse | | Prvic; 44.9332°N 14.7682°E | 1875 | 5 m (16 ft) | 21 m (69 ft) | 9 nmi (17 km) | 29 |
| Struga Lighthouse | | Skrivena Luka; 42.7241°N 16.8847°E | 1839 | 23 m (75 ft) | 10 m (33 ft) | 27 nmi (50 km) | 30 |
| Sućuraj Lighthouse | | Sućuraj; 43.12499°N 17.19646°E | 1912 | 14 m (46 ft) | 14 m (46 ft) | 11 nmi (20 km) | 31 |
| Sušac Lighthouse | | Islet near Lastovo; 42.75019°N 16.48985°E | 1878 | 17 m (56 ft) | 94 m (308 ft) | 24 nmi (44 km) | 32 |
| Susak Lighthouse | | Susak; 44.514414°N 14.301742°E | 1881 | 12 m (39 ft) | 100 m (328 ft) | 19 nmi (35 km) | 33 |
| Sveti Andrija Lighthouse | | Sveti Andrija; 42.646513°N 17.951282°E | 1873 | 17 m (56 ft) | 69 m (226 ft) | 24 nmi (44 km) | 34 |
| Sveti Ivan na Pucini Lighthouse | | Istria; 45.04296°N 13.61423°E | 1853 | 15 m (49 ft) | 23 m (75 ft) | 24 nmi (44 km) | 35 |
| Sveti Nikola Lighthouse | | Pucisca; 43.36180°N 16.73532°E | 1882 | 15 m (49 ft) | 23 m (75 ft) | 8 nmi (15 km) | 36 |
| Sveti Petar Lighthouse | | Makarska; 43.294847°N 17.008584°E | 1884 | 14 m (46 ft) | 16 m (52 ft) | 11 nmi (20 km) | 37 |
| Tri Sestrice (Rivanj) Lighthouse | | Rivanj; 44.172139°N 15.011916°E | 1899 | 16 m (52 ft) | 16 m (52 ft) | 8 nmi (15 km) | 38 |
| Trstenik Lighthouse | | Islet near Cres; 44.668723°N 14.578144°E | 1873 | 12 m (39 ft) | 26 m (85 ft) | 11 nmi (20 km) | 39 |
| Veli Rat Lighthouse | | Veli Rat; 44.152028°N 14.820235°E | 1849 | 36 m (118 ft) | 41 m (135 ft) | 22 nmi (41 km) | 40 |
| Verudica Lighthouse | | Pula; 44.833071°N 13.83382°E | 1877 | 8 m (26 ft) | 11 m (36 ft) | 6 nmi (11 km) | 41 |
| Vir Lighthouse | | Vir; 44.303251°N 15.026116°E | 1881 | 11 m (36 ft) | 21 m (69 ft) | 21 nmi (39 km) | 42 |
| Voscica Lighthouse | | Cres; 45.238816°N 14.590809°E | 1875 | 8 m (26 ft) | 12 m (39 ft) | 3 nmi (6 km) | 43 |
| Vnetak Lighthouse | | Unije; 44.619347°N 14.235697°E | 1873 | 13 m (43 ft) | 17 m (56 ft) | 10 nmi (19 km) | 44 |
| Zaglav Lighthouse | | Cres; 44.921167°N 14.288439°E | 1876 | 15 m (49 ft) | 20 m (66 ft) | 10 nmi (19 km) | 45 |
| Zub Lighthouse | | Poreč; 45.298117°N 13.569022°E | 1872 | 7 m (23 ft) | 11 m (36 ft) | 9 nmi (17 km) | 46 |

== Other lighthouses ==
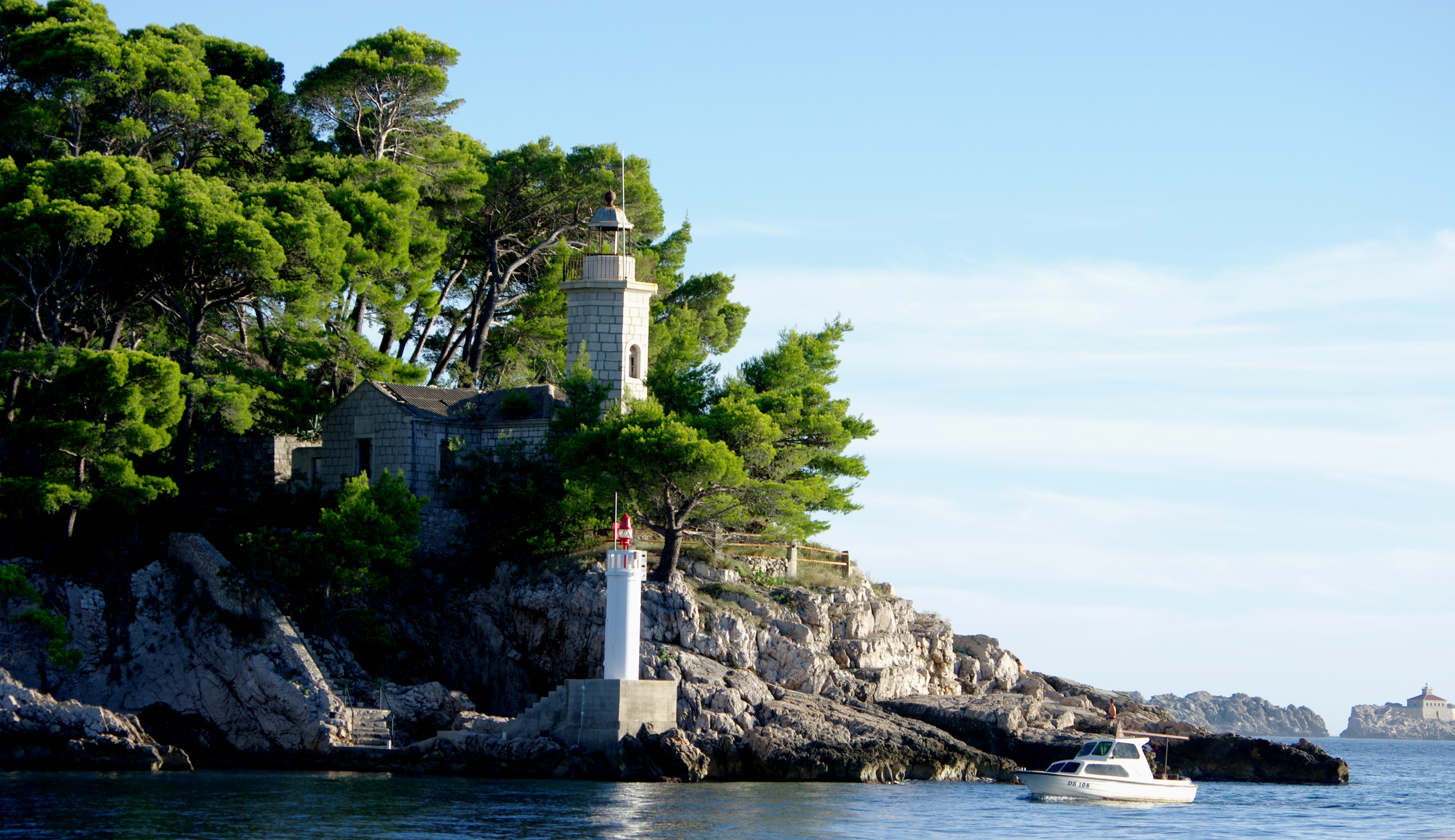
Daksa an inactive lighthouse with lower post light

A total of 122 lighthouses are included in the lists produced by the University of North Carolina, which includes those shown in the main list, and a number of smaller lights. In some cases inactive lighthouses have been replaced by an adjacent post light. Examples include Daksa, Rt Blaca and Negrit.

== See also ==
- Lists of lighthouses and lightvessels
