= Blitvenica Lighthouse =

Lighthouse in Croatia

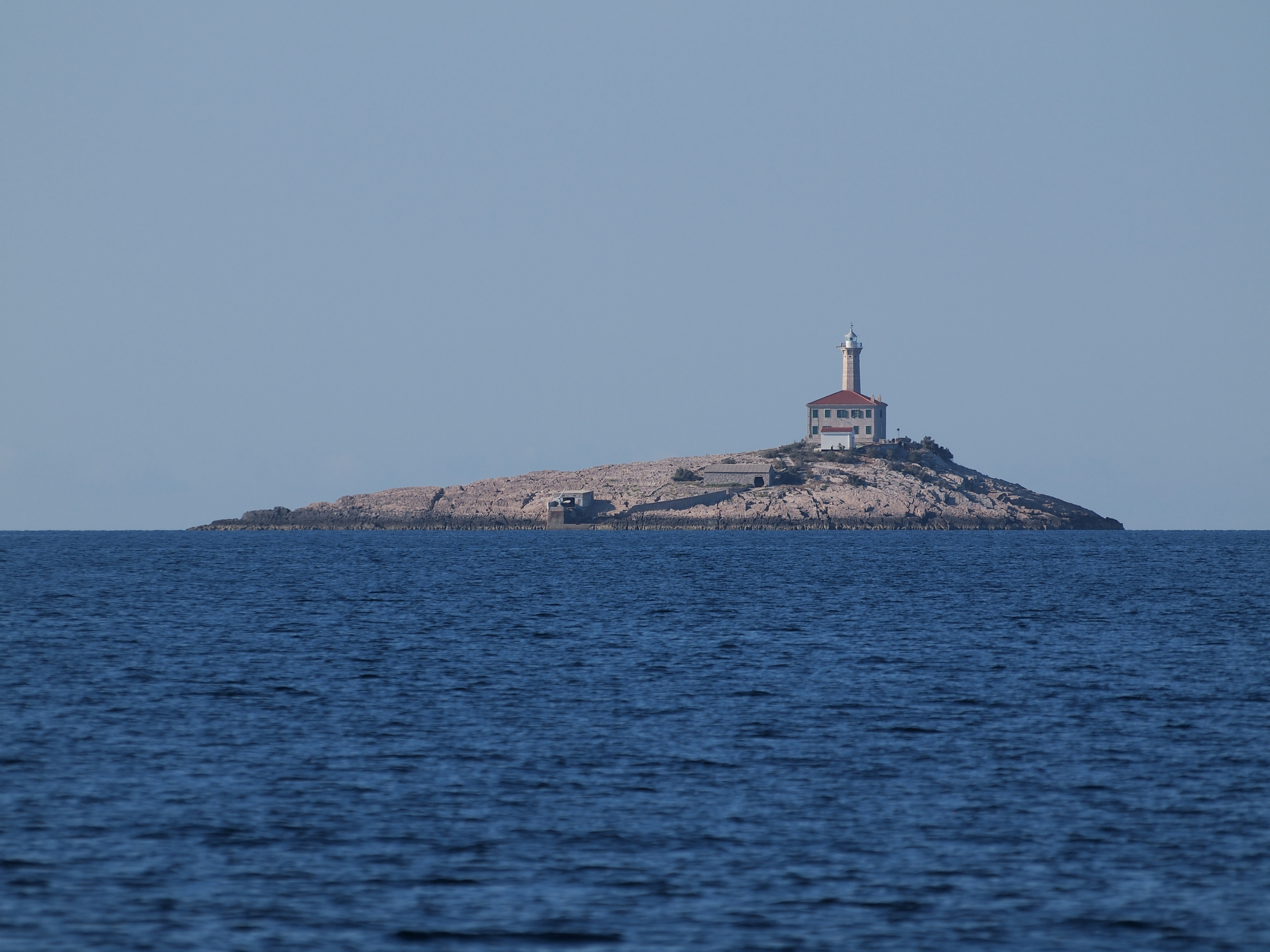
- Location: Žirje, Croatia
- Coordinates: 43.625254°N 15.574502°E

Tower
- Constructed: 1872
- Construction: stone tower
- Automated: 1990
- Height: 21 metres (69 ft)
- Shape: octagonal tower with lantern and gallery
- Markings: unpainted stone tower and white lantern
- Heritage: Register of Cultural Goods of Croatia

Light
- Focal height: 38 metres (125 ft)
- Range: main: 24 nautical miles (44 km; 28 mi) reserve: 12 nautical miles (22 km; 14 mi)
- Characteristic: Fl (2) W 30s.

Blitvenica Lighthouse is an active lighthouse on a Croatian islet of the same name, at the extreme western end of the Šibenik archipelago, and lies to the southwest of the island of Žirje in the Adriatic Sea.

The steep rocky islet lies next to a deep water abyss with depths reaching 200 metres (660 ft), with the steeply shelving sea floor containing red coral. The deep water is rich in fish such as tuna, making it a popular big game fishing spot. Blue sharks have also been seen feeding on the tuna nearby. Blitvenica is well known for its strong currents and rough seas, making landing risky except in calm conditions.

== History ==
Completed in 1872, the lighthouse consists of a two-storey house, built around the base of a 21 metre high octagonal tower, which supports a single gallery and a white painted lantern. Construction of the lighthouse was often delayed due to difficulties in landing materials on the islet during rough seas. Workers were often stranded for a number of days when the conditions worsened, leaving them to survive on minimal provisions. Obtaining fresh water was also a problem due to the low rainfall, so a water cistern was also built for the keepers and is still used today.

At a height of 38 m above the sea, the light has a range of 24 nautical miles and consists of two flashes of white light every thirty seconds. There is also a secondary standby light that has a range of 12 nautical miles.

The lighthouse is operated and maintained by the state-owned company Plovput. In 1990 the light was automated and the keepers were withdrawn, but in 2002 they returned to the site due to its importance, and to help with its upkeep and to keep it secure. A shift on the islet lasts for fifteen days.

In 2011, Blitvenica in conjunction with the lighthouses at Mulo and Prisnjak were depicted in a set of commemorative stamps by the Croatian postal service Hrvatska pošta.

== See also ==
- List of lighthouses in Croatia
