= Pokonji Dol =

Islet

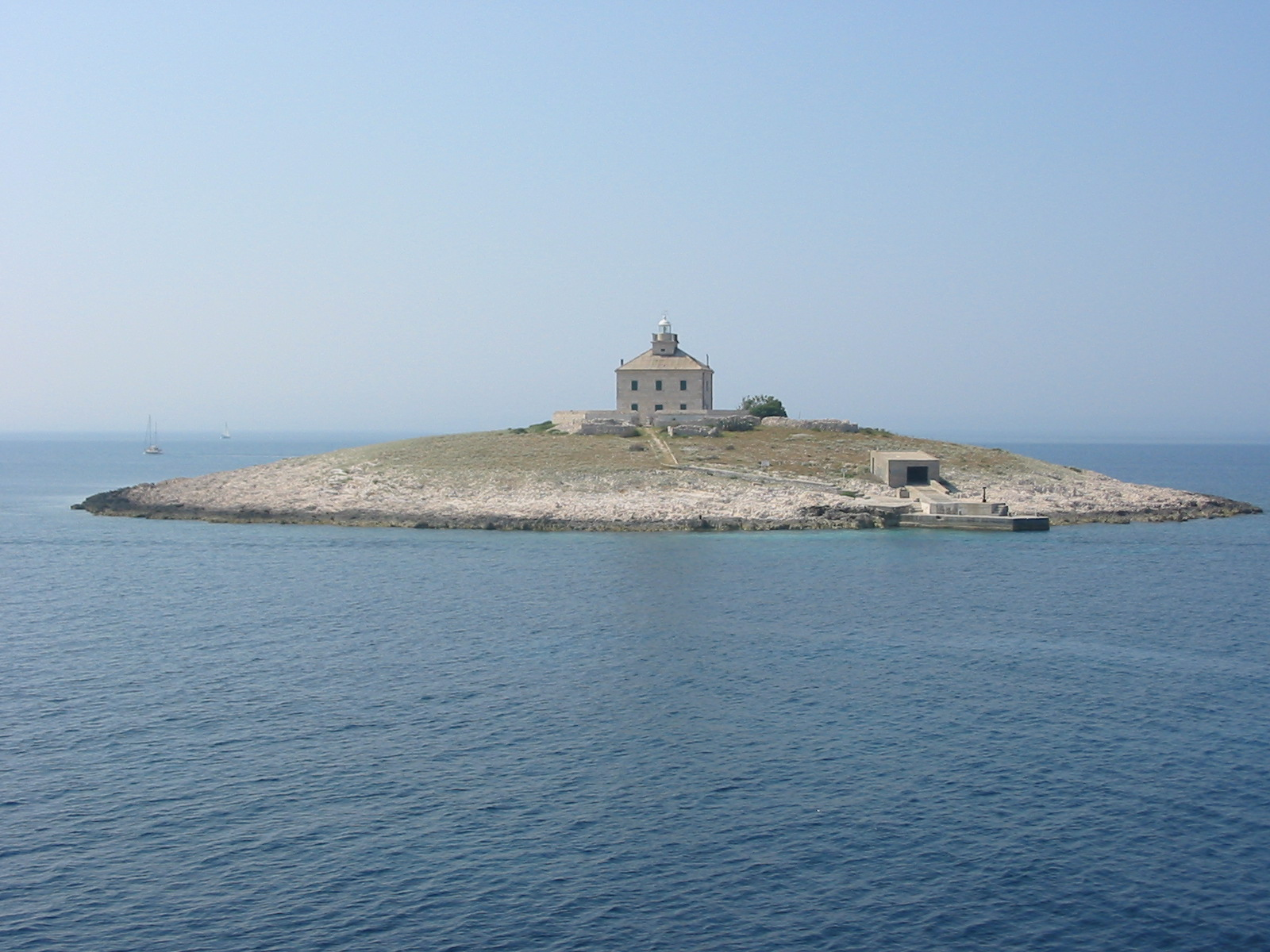
- Pokonji Dol from the ferry Hvar – Korčula

- Location within Croatia
- Interactive map of Pokonji Dol

Geography
- Coordinates: 43°09′24″N 16°27′10″E
- Archipelago: Paklinski Islands
- Area: 0.017 km^{2} (0.0066 sq mi)
- Length: 0.170 km (0.1056 mi)
- Width: 0.140 km (0.087 mi)
- Coastline: 0.47 km (0.292 mi)
- Highest elevation: 11 m (36 ft)

Administration
- Croatia
- County: Split-Dalmatia County
- Pokonji Dol Lighthouse
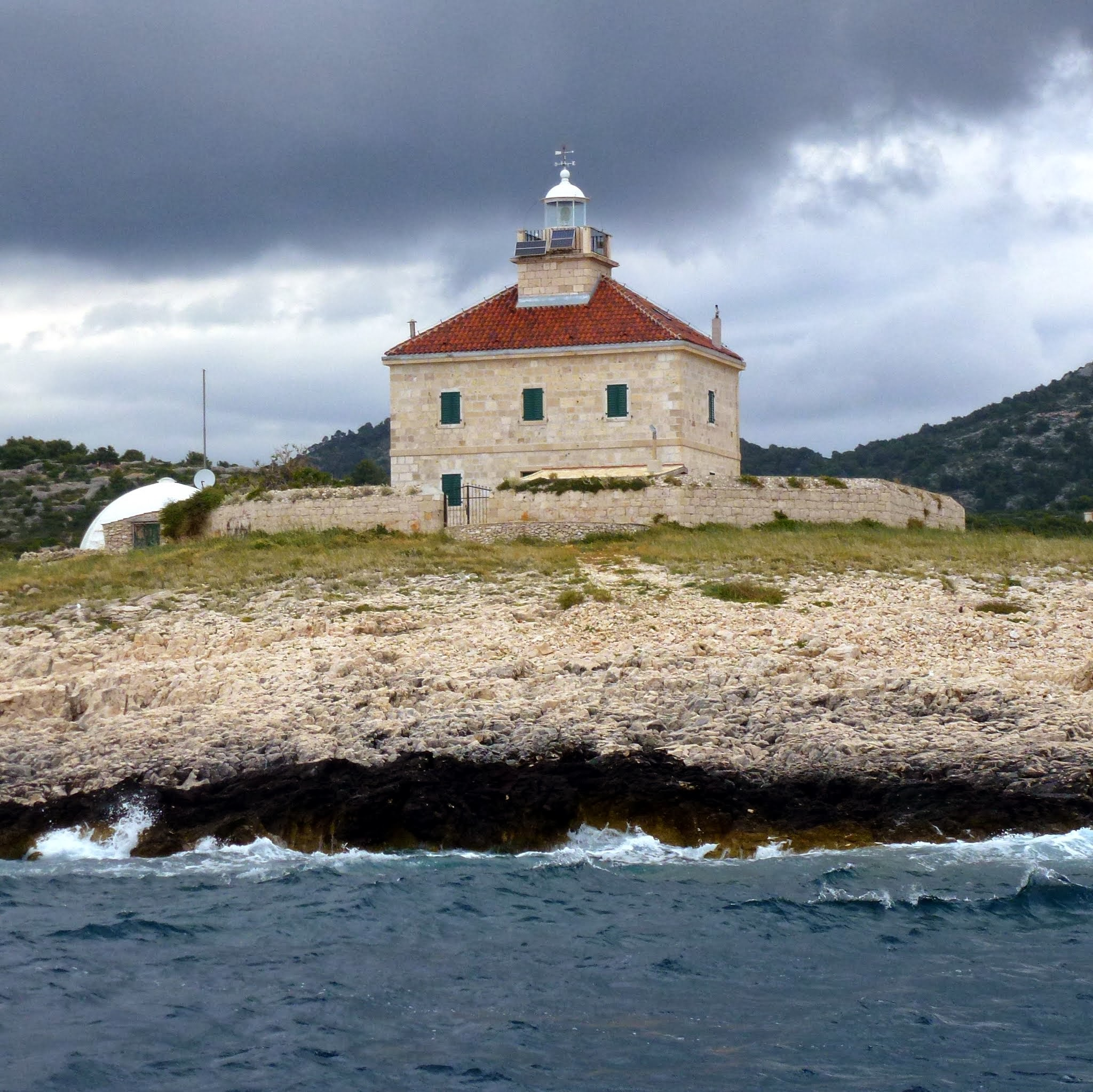
- Coordinates: 43°09′24″N 16°27′10″E
- Constructed: 1872
- Construction: stone
- Height: 15 feet (4.6 m)
- Shape: square tower with balcony and lantern centred on the roof of the two-story keeper’s house
- Markings: unpainted stone
- Operator: Plovput
- Heritage: Register of Cultural Goods of Croatia
- Focal height: 20 feet (6.1 m)
- Range: main: 10 nautical miles (19 km; 12 mi) reserve: 5 nautical miles (9.3 km; 5.8 mi)
- Characteristic: W Fl 4s

Pokonji Dol is an islet in the Croatian part of the Adriatic Sea, which is situated 500 meters south from Hvar. Pokonji Dol is one of the Paklinski Islands. The lighthouse in the middle of the islet was built in 1872. Because Pokonji Dol is the easternmost island of the Paklinski otoci archipelago, the lighthouse ensures the safe navigation of vessels coming from the open sea.

== See also ==
- List of lighthouses in Croatia
