= Mikavica =

- Hamlet
- Country: Croatia
- County: Šibenik-Knin
- City: Šibenik
- Settlement: Žirje
- Time zone: UTC+1 (CET)
  - Summer (DST): UTC+2 (CEST)

Mikavica is a hamlet and a bay on isle of Žirje in Croatia. It is connected by the D128 road.
