= Stražica Lighthouse =

Lighthouse in Croatia

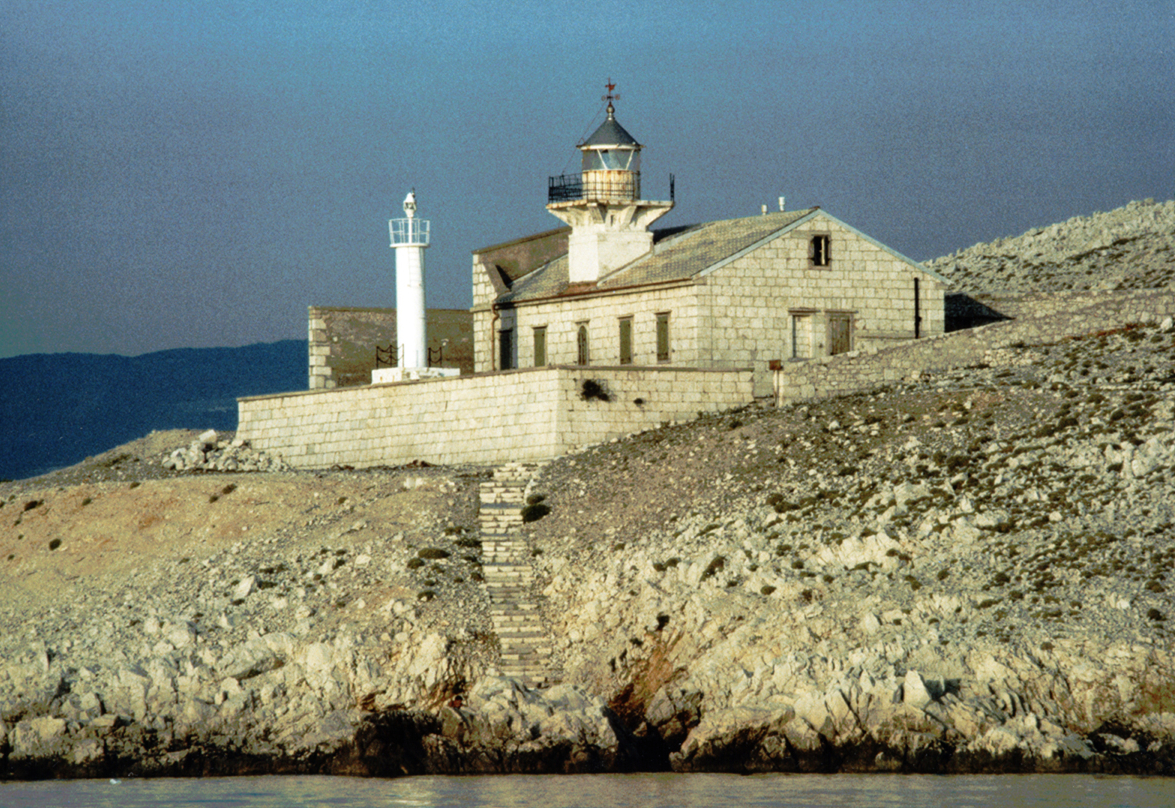
- Stražica lighthouse in 1990
- Location: Prvić, Croatia
- Coordinates: 44.93324°N 14.76816°E

Tower
- Constructed: 1875
- Automated: 1974
- Height: 5 metres (16 ft)
- Shape: Square tower on roof of dwelling

Light
- Focal height: 21 metres (69 ft)
- Range: 9 nautical miles (17 km; 10 mi)
- Characteristic: Fl W 6s

Stražica Lighthouse on the island of Prvić in the Adriatic Sea was built in 1875 and consists of a small stone house and a 5-metre (16 ft) tall lighthouse tower. A crew of lightkeepers were stationed on the island until it was fully automated in 1974. In 1993 the natural gas-powered system was replaced with solar panels and is today remotely controlled by Plovput, the state-owned company for maritime traffic which controls the entire network of Croatian lighthouses. Until 1974, the lighthouse crew were the only inhabitants of Prvić, and until the early 2000s it was believed that Prvić held the distinction of being the largest uninhabited Croatian island, but this was refuted when new measurements published in 2004 showed that the island of Žut is bigger by some 2 square kilometres (0.77 sq mi).

== See also ==
- List of lighthouses in Croatia
