= Savudrija Lighthouse =

Lighthouse in Croatia

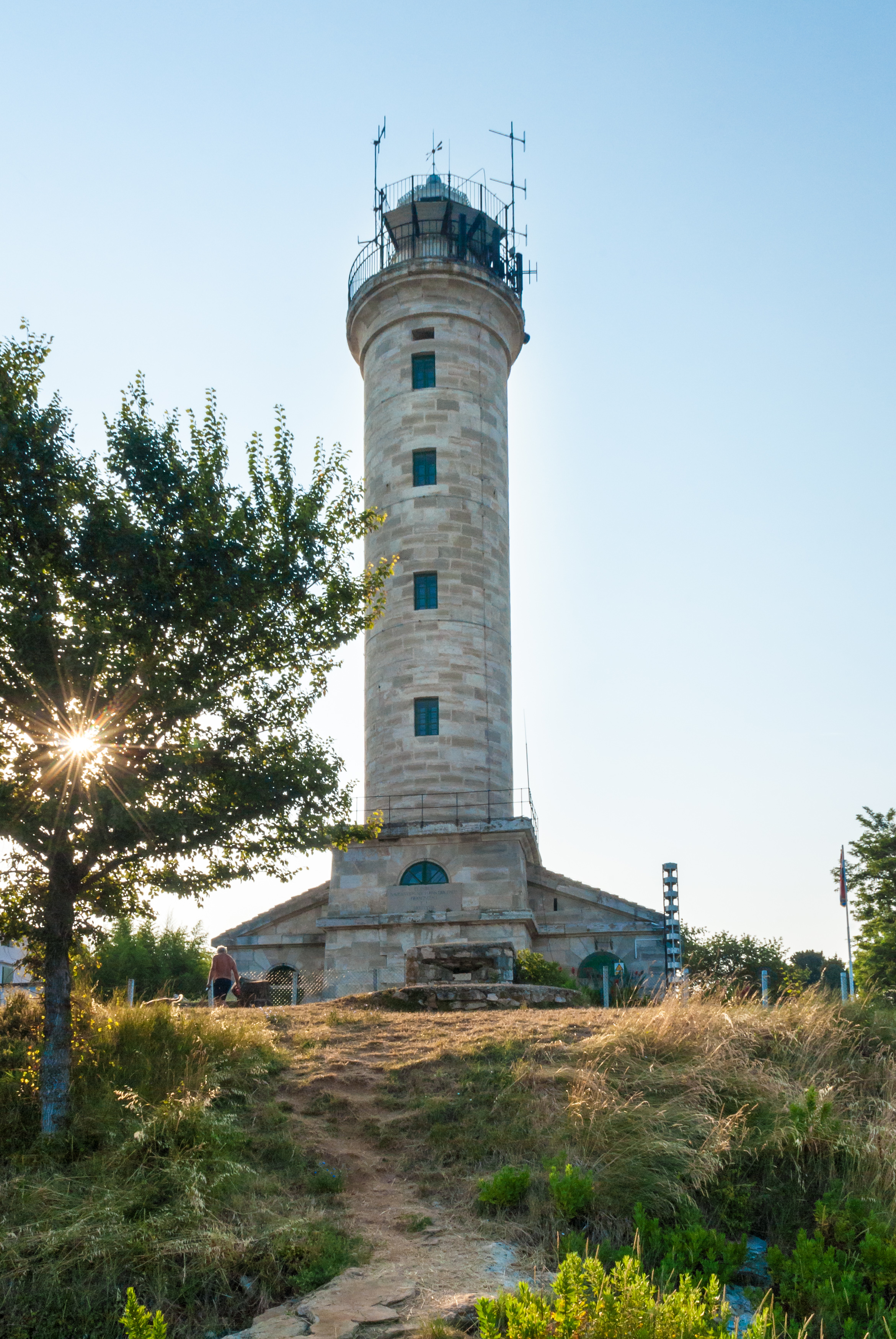
- Location: Savudrija, Croatia
- Coordinates: 45.489966°N 13.49095°E

Tower
- Constructed: 1818
- Height: 29 metres (95 ft)
- Shape: Cylindrical stone tower with lantern and double gallery
- Fog signal: 42s (4+4;4+30)

Light
- Focal height: 36 metres (118 ft)
- Range: 30 nautical miles (56 km; 35 mi)
- Characteristic: FI(3) W 15s

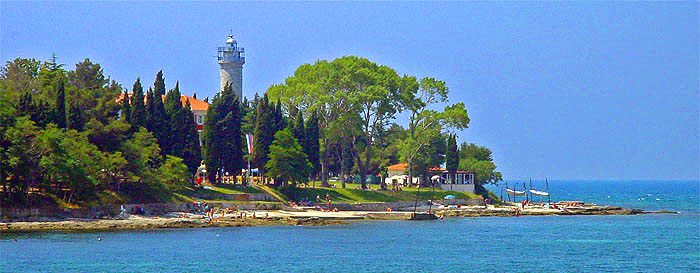
Savudrija lighthouse

Savudrija Lighthouse is the oldest lighthouse in Croatia, located near the village of the same name, at the northern end of the Istrian peninsula, close to the Slovenian border which is at the southern end of the Gulf of Trieste. Also known as Cape Savudrija lighthouse, the cape or point called Punta Salvore in Italian, was commonly known as the Punta Salvore Lighthouse prior to the Second World War.

Completed in 1818, it is the oldest operational light of the Adriatic. Whilst the Italian lighthouse at Barletta known as the Faro Napoleon is considered to have been built at an earlier date in 1807, it was subsequently deactivated and replaced by a breakwater lighthouse in 1959.

It was initially lit with coal gas, the first lighthouse to be designed and operated in this way. Although widely publicised as a success, ongoing problems meant that it was rapidly replaced with an oil fuelled system.

== History ==
Designed by the architect Pietro Nobile, construction began in March 1817 and was funded by a share issue through the Trieste Chamber of Commerce, who had actively promoted the need for a lighthouse to assist with navigation to the Port of Trieste. It was also sponsored by Francis I of Austria, who was present when the lighthouse was first lit in April 1818.

Local stone was used to build the 19 metre tower, which supported a double gallery and a grey lantern. The buildings including a two-storey principal keeper's house, and other single storey buildings were a later addition completed in 1821. The height of the tower was subsequently increased by 10m to its current height of 29m in the late 19th century.

In 2007, the lighthouse at Savudrija was depicted in a set of commemorative stamps by the Croatian postal service Hrvatska pošta.

== Operation ==
The lighthouse is operated by the state owned company Plovput. Since 2000, rooms within the lighthouse have also been made available for rent as holiday accommodation. Although automated, the light is still staffed, with lighthouse keepers helping to secure and maintain the site. The current keeper as of 2021 is Mario Milin Ungar, continuing a line of service that extends back five generations in the Ungar family.

At a height of 36m above the sea, the light has a range of 30 nautical miles and consists of three flashes of white light every fifteen seconds.

== Legend ==
There is a romantic tale associated with the lighthouse, in which it is said that Count Metternich had it built for a beautiful and attractive Croatian lady of high birth, whom he met and fell in love with at first sight during a ball in Vienna. The Austrian Count and his mistress were destined not to live there, as she became ill and then died on the same day that it was completed, and he never set foot in the lighthouse again.

== See also ==
- List of lighthouses in Croatia
