= Jadrija Lighthouse =

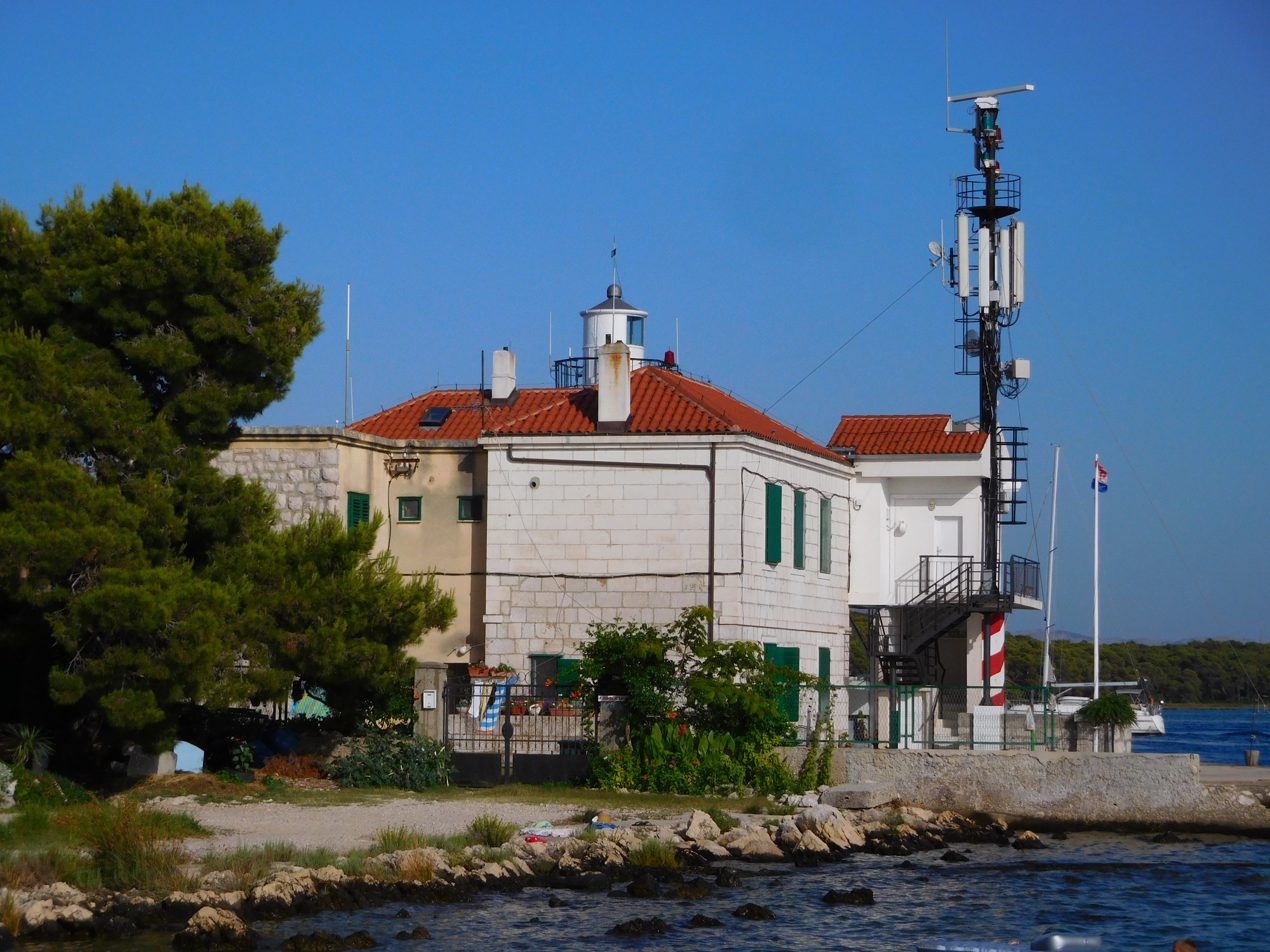
- Location: St. Anthony Channel, near Šibenik, Šibenik-Knin County, Croatia
- Coordinates: 43.721644°N 15.850050°E

Tower
- Constructed: 1871
- Construction: Stone tower
- Automated: yes
- Height: 12 metres (39 ft)
- Shape: Octagonal tower with attached two-storey keeper's house
- Markings: Natural stone-coloured tower, white lantern
- Operator: Plovput d.o.o.
- Heritage: Protected cultural monument (Croatia), reg. no. Z-3538
- Fog signal: Horn: two 4-second blasts every 20 seconds, audible to 2 nmi

Light
- First lit: 1871
- Focal height: 11 metres (36 ft)
- Range: 9 nautical miles (17 km; 10 mi)
- Characteristic: Fl(2) R 6s
- [Amateur Radio Lighthouse Society ARLHS] no.: CRO-058

Jadrija Lighthouse (Croatian: Svjetionik Rt Jadrija) is a lighthouse on the left side of the St. Anthony Channel, the narrow strait leading into the harbour of Šibenik, Croatia. Built in 1871, it is considered the first modern lighthouse in the Šibenik area and today doubles as the only vessel traffic signal station on the Adriatic Sea. It stands at the tip of the Jadrija peninsula, the city, district and public beach that take its name from the lighthouse and the islet it was built on.

== History ==
The lighthouse was built in 1871 by the Austro-Hungarian Naval Command as part of a wider programme of lighthouse and port construction along the eastern Adriatic coast, on the former islet of St. Andrew (Sveti Andrija), which was later joined to the mainland by landfill. Its 100th and 140th anniversaries, in 1971 and 2011, were marked with commemorative postal issues. The building consists of an original L-shaped stone structure and rectangular annex added later that altered the floor plan into an incomplete U-shape; an octagonal three-storey tower with a stone base and metal lantern rises from the south-eastern façade.

The lighthouse's east wall carries stone portrait-sculptures of medieval Šibenik aristocrats, originally removed from Šibenik Cathedral (a UNESCO World Heritage Site since 1979) during its restoration and relocated here. The lighthouse is individually entered in the Register of Cultural Properties of the Republic of Croatia as a protected monument (registration no. Z-3538), and the adjoining beach cabins were separately registered by a Ministry of Culture decision of 12 July 2017.

== Vessel traffic signal ==
Beyond its function as a light, Jadrija operates the only maritime traffic signal system on the Adriatic. The St. Anthony Channel narrows to about 140 metres (460 ft) at its tightest point, too narrow for two large vessels to pass safely at once, so traffic is controlled from the station much like a road signal. A red light is shown at all times; there is no amber phase, and a green light is displayed only on request for vessels over 50 gross tons, which must obtain permission from the station before entering the channel. In summer, daily traffic through the channel can exceed 1,500 vessels. Before electric signalling, the station used black spheres and red triangles to convey the same instructions. The station is staffed around the clock, with operators monitoring the channel by camera and radio; violations are rare and, lacking direct enforcement powers, operators refer them to port authorities.

== See also ==
- List of lighthouses in Croatia
- Jadrija
