= Palmižana =

Tourist resort in Croatia

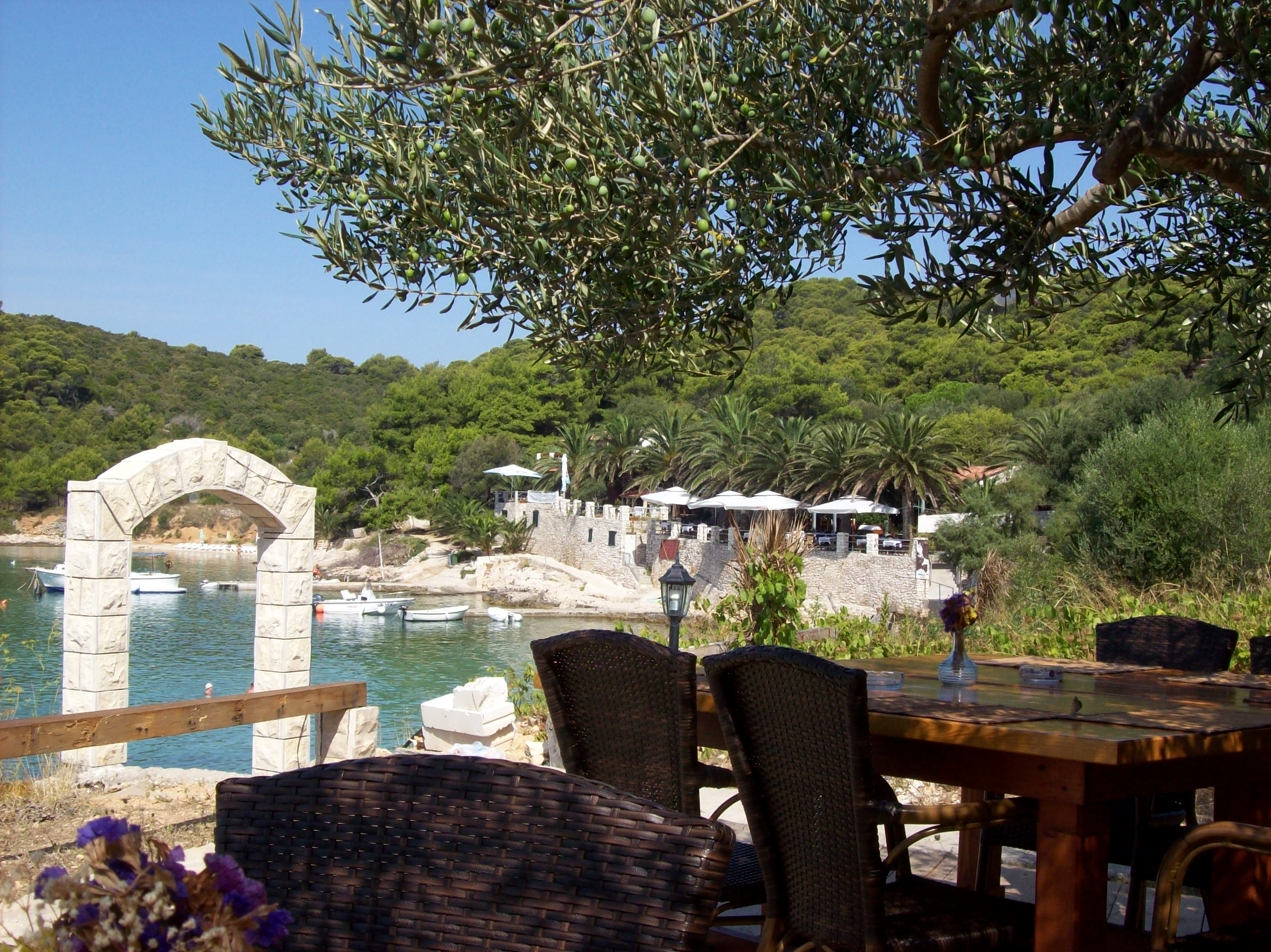
Palmizana, circa 2008

Palmižana is a small uninhabited village and tourist resort on the Croatian island of Sveti Klement (St. Clement) in the Adriatic Sea, located off the Dalmatian coast.

Sveti Klement island and Palmižana are geographically located in the Paklinski Islands archipelago and administratively they are part of the Split-Dalmatia County of Croatia.

Palmižana has a marina with room for 200 boats, a small shop and a tourist information office.

== History ==
The name is a misnomer and it comes from the word “Paklina”, which is a derivative of pine resin used for filling the gaps between the keel and the boat. The islands offer abundant shelter from any wind direction and were used as ports for merchant and war navies of the ancient Phoenicians, Greeks, Romans, and others.

On 23 September 2023, a waterspout was filmed making landfall at Palmižana.

== Tourism ==
Tourism on Palmižana was established in 1906 by Professor Eugen Meneghello on his 300-year-old estate. He imported exotic plants from all over the world and created a botanical park. Eugen's son, Giorgio Meneghello Toto, built the island's complex, and his wife, Dagmar (née: Gebauer), has been managing Palmižana for over 30 years. Currently, Dagmar manages Palmižana with the help of her three children and her grandson. Palmižana is well known for Vinogradice Bay, which is nautical center for many sailors in Croatia.

== Plants and animals ==
The rosemary plant is widespread on Palmižana and blooms several times a year, giving Palmizana its second name: "The Island of the Rosemary". Aloe, another plant, is also widespread. As for wildlife, Palmižana is home to lizards and some snakes, which are non-venomous.

== Sites ==
This area of the Adriatic conceals a number of antique shipwrecks and places on the seabed where one can easily find amphore. The Meneghello family amphore collection is one of the biggest in the Adriatic because of this.

The botanical gardens of Palmižana contain a wide variety of plant species, including tree-like opuntias (prickly pear), agaves, numerous other cacti and succulents, mimosas, eucalyptuses, laurels, olives and different kinds of aromatic herbs and plants.

== Cuisine ==
Traditional Palmižana cuisine is known for its seafood specialties, based on fish, lobsters, scampi, shellfish and other seafood served with fresh vegetables from the island gardens. The cuisine has been declared one of the best in the Mediterranean by the German Magazine Boote, English Traveler and Croatian magazines Gloria and Playboy.

== The Marina ==
ACI marina Palmižana lies in Palmižana Bay on the northeastern coast of St. Clement Island. The marina is protected from all winds except those from the north and northeast, while strong south and southwest winds can cause swells. The marina has room for 200 boats and is open from the middle of March to the end of October.

The marina has 160 berths, all with water and power supply. The harbor has a reception facility, exchange office, restaurant, toilets and showers, and grocery store. The nearest gas station (2.5 Nm) is in the Hvar harbor (Križna luka). Since August, 1999, ACI marina Palmižana has continuous power supply and more power supply at the marina piers.

The marina is situated in one of the safest natural harbors on the Adriatic Sea, renowned for its safety since ancient times. It is situated 3.5 km from Hvar. It offers 190 moorings with optional connections to the water and electric power, telephone and VHF links.
