= Sveti Klement =

Island in the Adriatic Sea

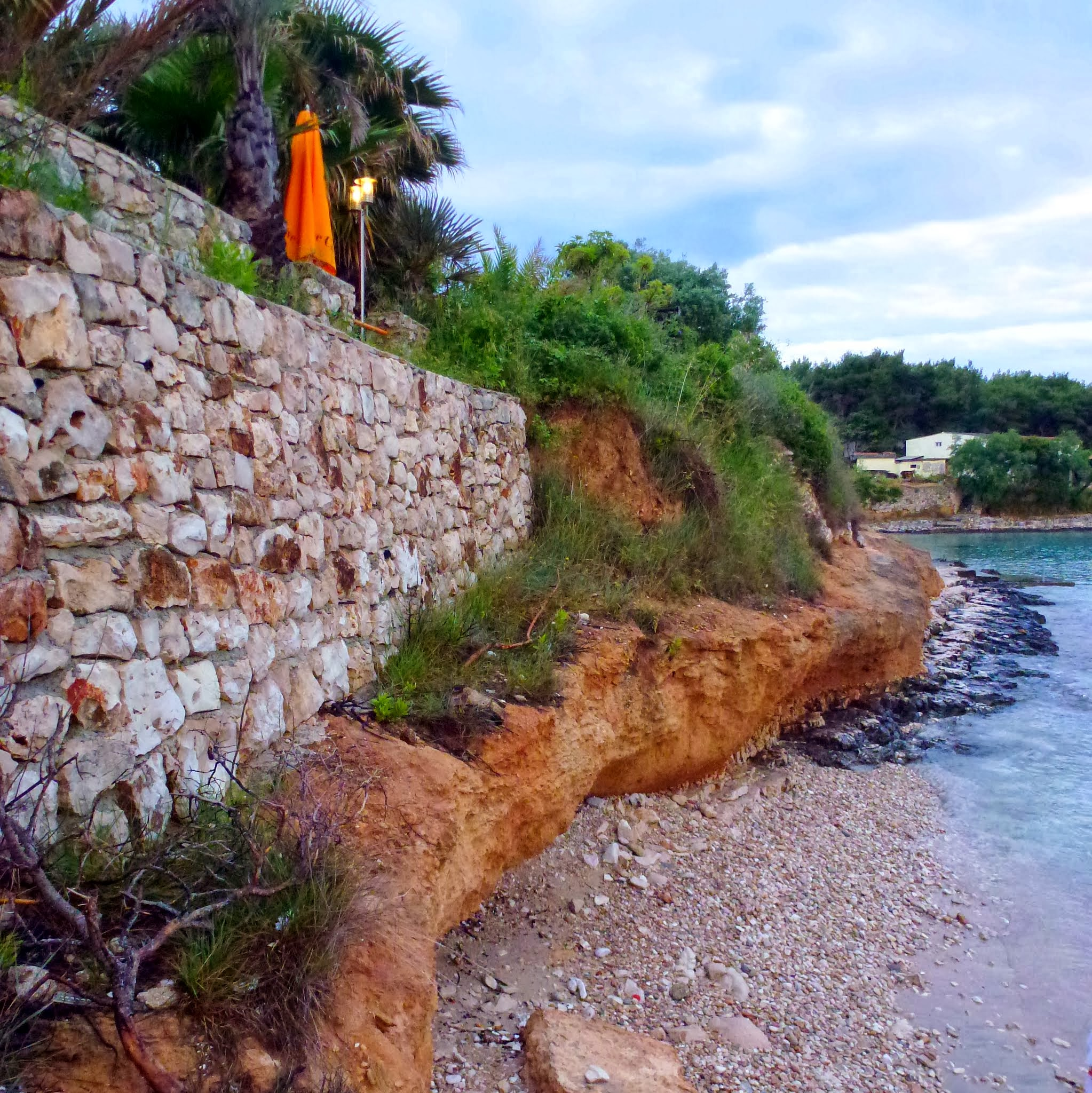
- Saint Clement Island, Croatia

- Location within Croatia
- Interactive map of Sveti Klement

Geography
- Location: Adriatic Sea
- Coordinates: 43°09′58″N 16°22′30″E
- Archipelago: Paklinski Islands
- Area: 5.28 km^{2} (2.04 sq mi)

Administration
- Croatia
- County: Split-Dalmatia County

Sveti Klement (Croatian for Saint Clement) is an island in the Croatian part of the Adriatic Sea. Its area is 5.28 km^{2} and it is the largest of the Paklinski islands, a group of small islands located in central Dalmatia just south of Hvar. Its coastline is 29.89 km long.

The coastal part of the island is barren and rocky, while parts of the interior are covered in maquis shrubs. There are three non-permanent settlements on the island called Palmižana, Momića Polje and Vlaka. There is also a marina operated by ACI Club in Palmižana, open from March to October.

Sveti Klement is a very popular tourist area. Besides having a marina, Sveti Klement has a couple of restaurants and a unique lounge bar. It is also a popular destination for weddings.

- Paklinski Islands
- List of islands of Croatia
