= Jerolim (island) =

Croatian island

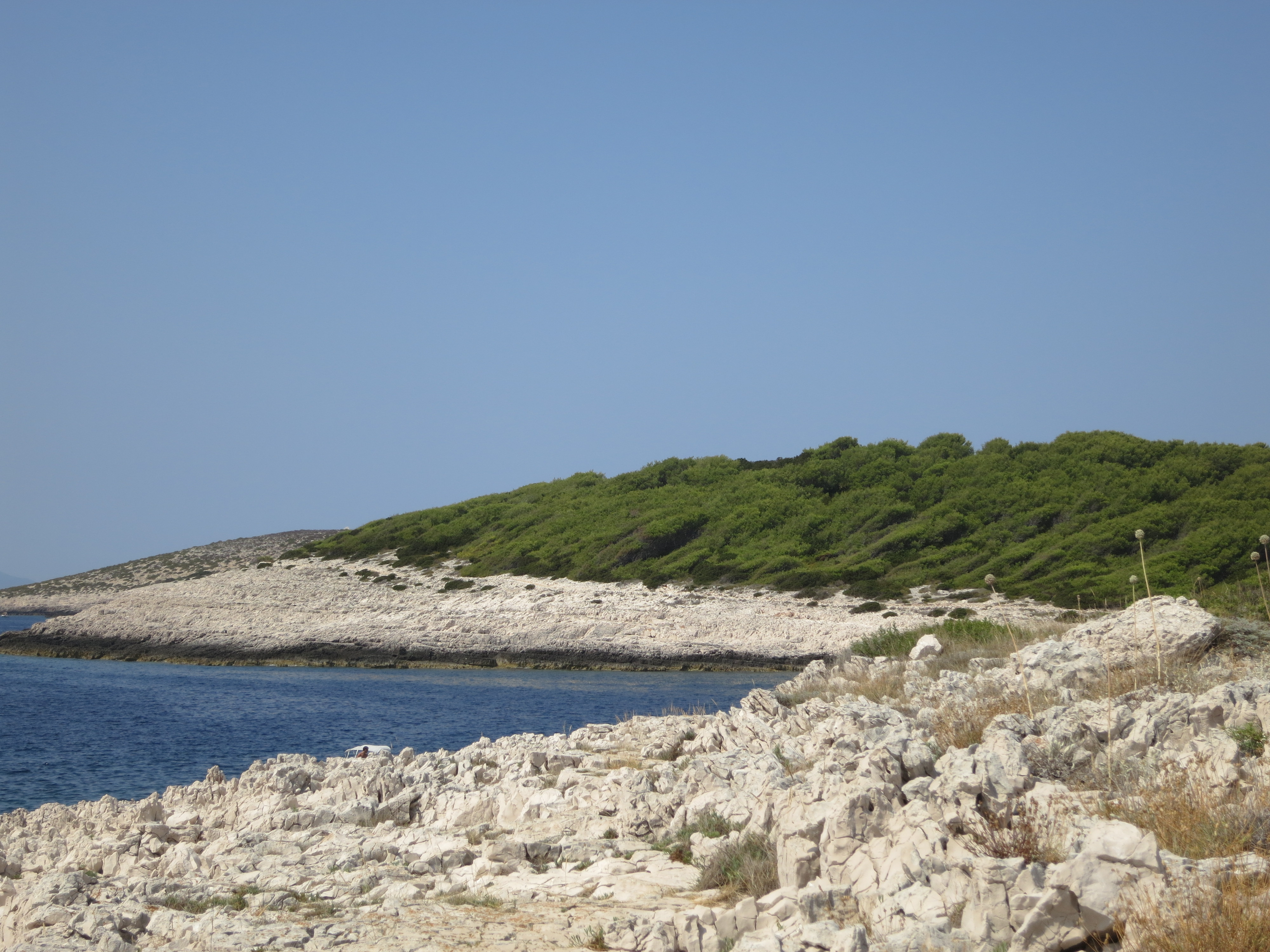
- Jerolim
- Interactive map of Jerolim

Geography
- Location: Adriatic Sea
- Coordinates: 43°09′38″N 16°26′01″E
- Archipelago: Paklinski Islands
- Area: 0.207144 km^{2} (0.079979 sq mi)
- Coastline: 2.37 km (1.473 mi)

Administration
- Croatia
- County: Split-Dalmatia County

Demographics
- Population: uninhabited

Jerolim is a Croatian island in the Adriatic Sea, one of the Paklinski Islands southwest of Hvar.

Jerolim has an area of 0.207 square kilometres (0.080 mi^{2}), and its coastline is 2.37 kilometres (1.47 mi) long.

Jerolim island is 5 minutes from Hvar town by taxi boat. Since the 1950s it is a naturist island, with clear sea, pine trees and restaurants
