= Pakleni Islands =

Islands

Coordinates: 43°10′N 16°22′E

Pakleni
Native name: Pakleni Otoci Nickname: Škoji
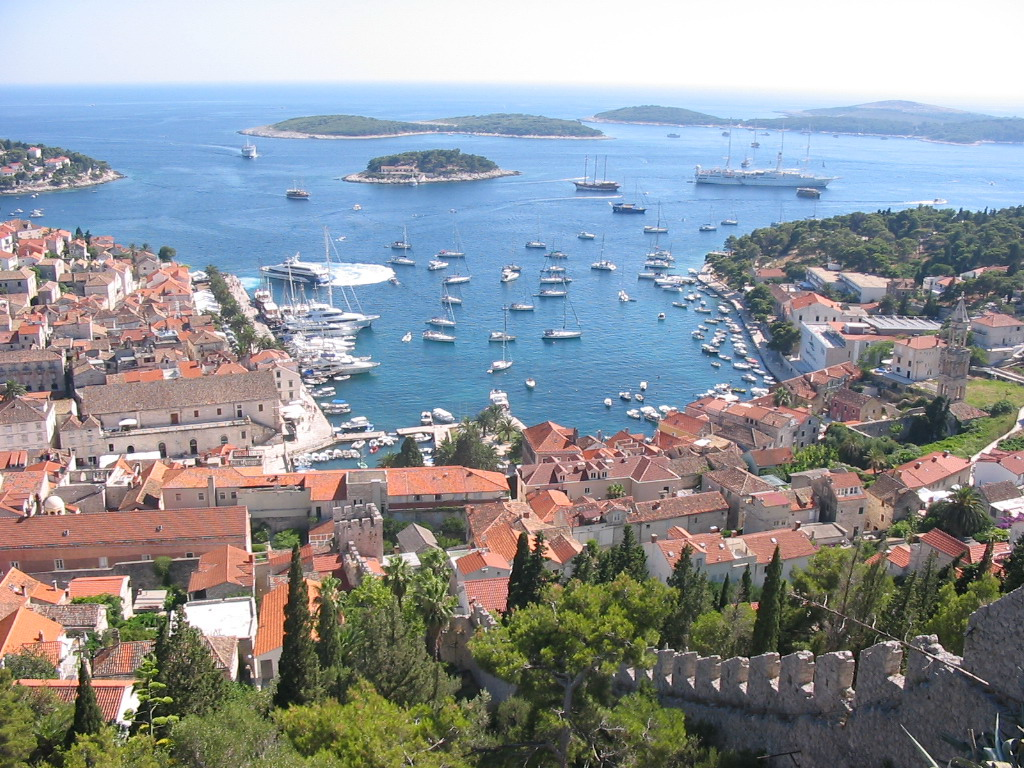
- Pakleni islands from the city of Hvar: Galešnik, Jerolim and Marinkovac (far right)

- Location within Croatia
- Interactive map of Pakleni

Geography
- Location: Adriatic Sea
- Total islands: 16
- Major islands: Sveti Klement, Marinkovac
- Area: 7.165093 km^{2} (2.766458 sq mi)
- Highest elevation: 94 m (308 ft)
- Highest point: Vela glava

Administration
- Croatia
- County: Split-Dalmatia County

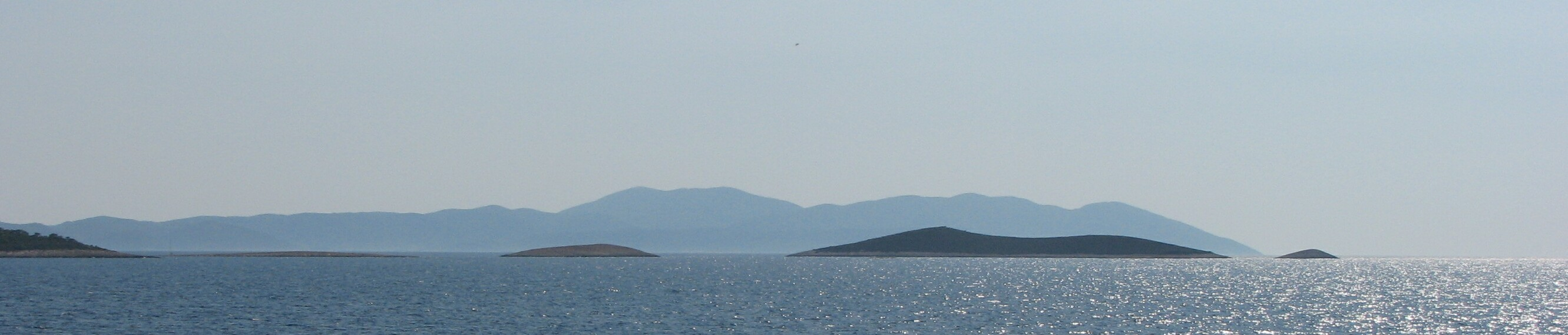
Pakleni islands: Mali Vodnjak (right), Veli Vodnjak (middle), Travna and Paržanj (left). The one in back is Vis.

The Pakleni (pronounced [pǎklɛniː]) or sometimes referred as Paklinski ([pâkliːnskiː]) islands are located off the southwest coast of the island of Hvar, Croatia, opposite the entrance to the Hvar (city) harbour. Usual local name is Škoji, which means Islands. The name is popularly translated as Hells' islands (pakleni: hellish), but it originally derives from paklina, an archaic word, from which pakleni is derived. too. "Paklina" means "tar", and in this case refers to the pine resin once used to coat ships that was harvested on these islands.

== Overview ==
The islands are (from west to east):

Island	Area (km^{2})
Vodnjak Mali	0.252666
Vodnjak Veli	0.008198
Travna	0.009661
Paržanj	0.039529
Borovac	0.021666
Sveti Klement	5.275844
Dobri otok	0.297313
Vlaka	0.021316
Stambedar	0.029945
Gojca	0.021471
Borovac	0.167533
Marinkovac	0.680662
Planikovac	0.100836
Jerolim	0.207144
Galešnik	0.014612
Pokonji Dol	0.016697
Pakleni Islands	7.165093

The main island of Sveti Klement is also called Veliki otok or Big island. It has 3 settlements, Palmižana, Momica Polje and Vlaka. There is a large, well protected yacht marina at Palmižana.

The chain of islands is approximately 10 kilometres (6.2 mi) long, formed of limestone, with a very indented coastline and low pine forest with black pine, and Aleppo pine. The highest point on the islands is 94 metres (308 ft). The islands are a popular destination for visitors with smaller craft, especially yachts, providing numerous peaceful coves for diving, underwater fishing, swimming and water sports.

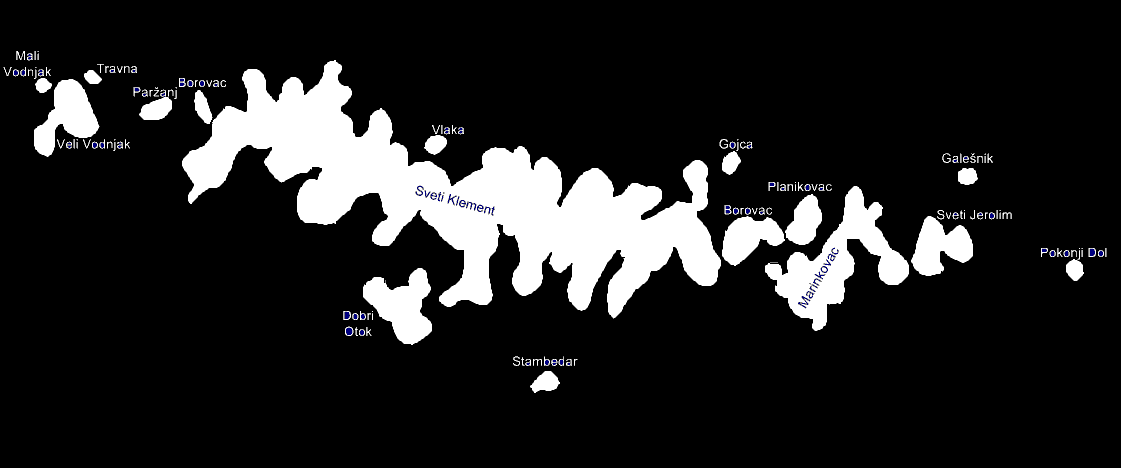
Pakleni islands map

== See also ==
- Croatia
- Dalmatia
- Hvar
