= D128 road =

Road in Croatia

D128 state road

Route information
- Length: 3.8 km (2.4 mi)

Major junctions
- From: Žirje ferry port
- To: Mikavica

Location
- Country: Croatia
- Counties: Šibenik-Knin

Highway system
- Highways in Croatia

D128 is a state road on Žirje Island in Croatia connecting the town of Žirje to Žirje ferry port, from where Jadrolinija ferries fly to the mainland, docking in Šibenik and the D33 state road. The road is 3.8 km (2.4 mi) long.

The road, as well as all other state roads in Croatia, is managed and maintained by Hrvatske ceste, a state-owned company.

== Road junctions and populated areas ==
D128 junctions/populated areas
Type	Slip roads/Notes
	Žirje ferry port – access to the mainland port of Šibenik (by Jadrolinija) and the D33 state road as well as the A1 motorway Šibenik interchange. The eastern terminus of the road.
	Žirje
	Mikavica; The western terminus of the road.
