= Plovput =

Plovput can refer to:

- Plovput (Croatia), Croatian state-owned company in charge of maintenance and operations of maritime waterways and lighthouses
- Plovput (Serbia), Serbian government agency in charge of development and maintenance of river waterways
