= Prvić (Krk) =

Croatia Island

Prvić (Parvić)
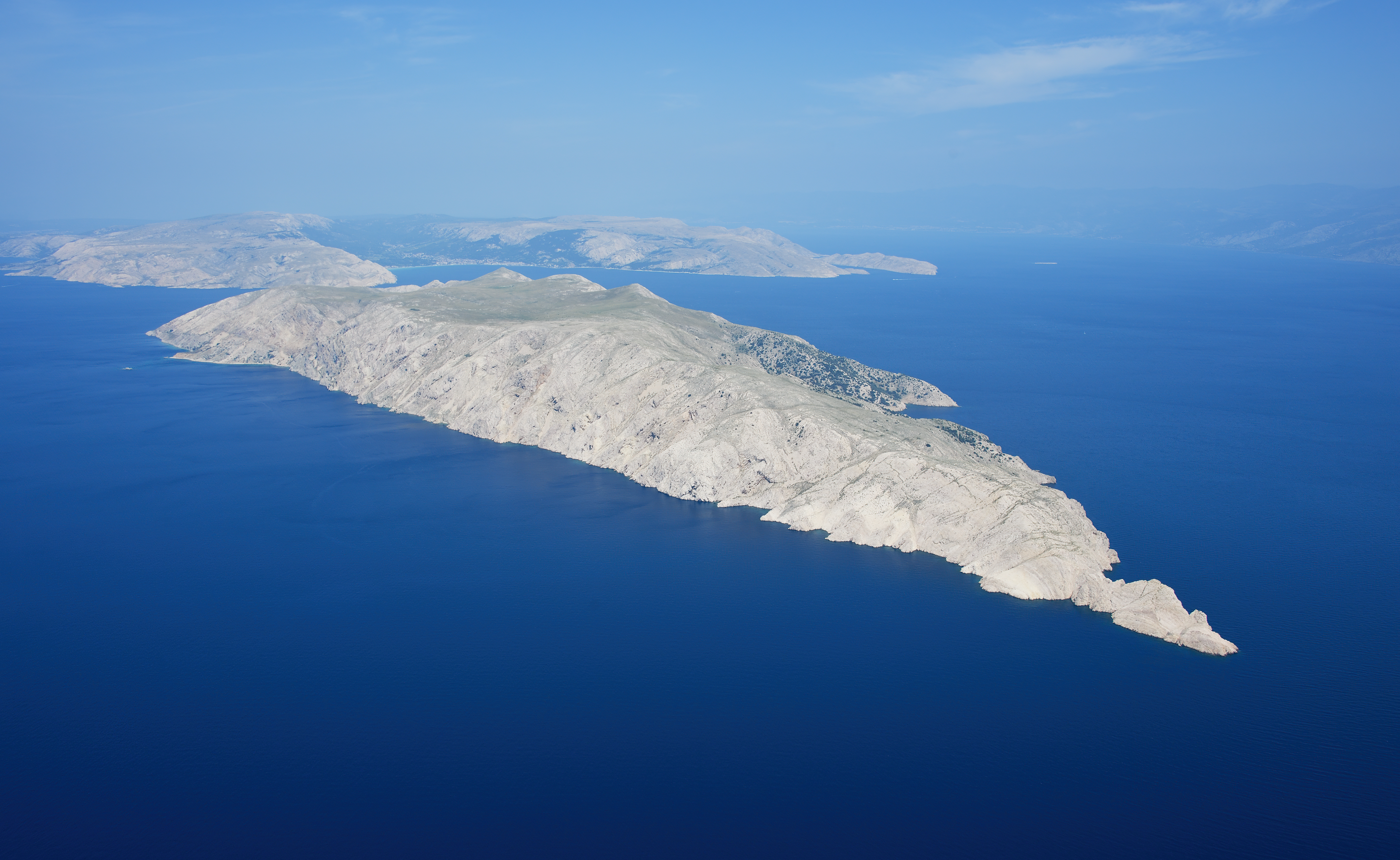
- Prvić seen from the air

- Location within Croatia
- Interactive map of Prvić (Parvić)

Geography
- Location: Adriatic Sea
- Coordinates: 44°54′38″N 14°48′05″E
- Archipelago: Kvarner Gulf, Senj Islands
- Area: 12.76 km^{2} (4.93 sq mi)
- Length: 7.4 km (4.6 mi)
- Coastline: 23.12 km (14.366 mi)
- Highest elevation: 357 m (1171 ft)
- Highest point: Šipovac

Administration
- Croatia
- County: Primorje-Gorski Kotar County

Prvić (pronounced [pr̩̂v̞itɕ], or Parvić in the Chakavian dialect; Pervicchio in Italian) is an uninhabited island in the Croatian part of the Adriatic Sea, located in the Kvarner Gulf. It is the largest of the so-called Senj Islands, a group of small islands and islets located off the coast of the mainland city of Senj, lying between the larger islands of Krk and Rab. Other significant islands in the Senj group are Sveti Grgur and Goli Otok, along with a number of islets and rocks, which are all uninhabited. Prvić has an area is 12.76 square kilometres (4.93 sq mi), which makes it the second largest uninhabited Croatian island and 30th largest overall.

== Geography ==
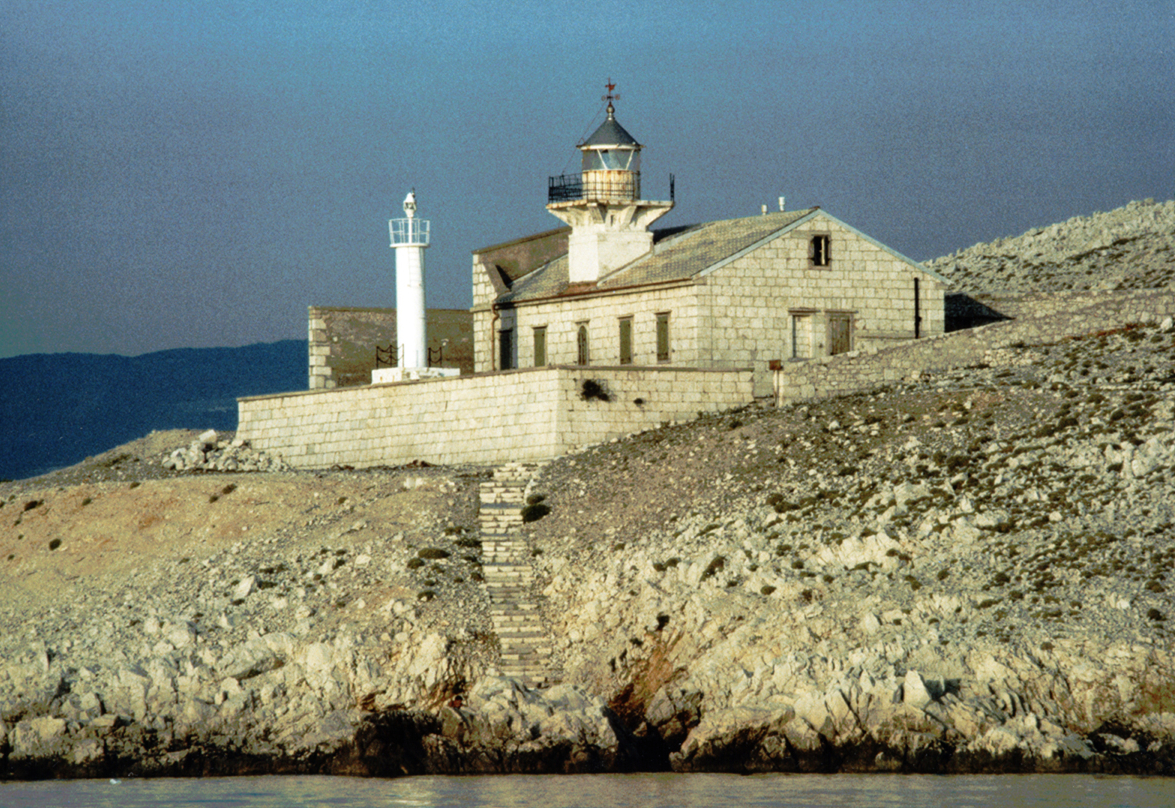
Stražica Lighthouse was built on the island in 1875.

Sinkholes on Prvić
Coordinates	Area (m^{2})	Elevation (m)
44.9139°N 14.7983°E	7600	292
44.9148°N 14.7976°E	3100	291
44.9152°N 14.8030°E	2150	326
44.9056°N 14.8032°E	635	263
44.91292°N 14.79744°E	415	296
44.9100°N 14.8035°E	255	274
44.90719°N 14.80492°E	155	266
44.91428°N 14.79794°E	47	292
44.91514°N 14.79742°E	46	293
44.91478°N 14.79781°E	43	291
44.90725°N 14.80475°E	42	266
44.90678°N 14.80636°E	38	267
44.91511°N 14.79761°E	34	293
44.90967°N 14.80355°E	29	273
44.91150°N 14.79817°E	28	298
44.90714°N 14.80508°E	26	265
44.90778°N 14.80700°E	25	276
44.9097°N 14.8003°E	24	282
44.90417°N 14.81097°E	18	293
44.91442°N 14.79550°E	16	291
44.91436°N 14.79506°E	10	291

Prvić is located southeast of Krk, separated from it by an 800 m wide Senj Passage (Senjska vrata) and it is geomorphologically considered part of the same landform as the Obzova hill, Krk's highest peak (578 meters above sea level), which forms the southwestern part of the Baška cove with the coastal town of Baška. Prvić's southernmost cape Šilo is 4 km (2 mi) away from the mainland as the crow flies and it is the point closest to mainland. Harbours nearest to Prvić are Sveti Juraj, a hamlet near Senj at the foot of the Velebit, and Baška on the island of Krk. The island itself is shaped like a steep cliff stretching northwest–southeast and is 7.4 km (4.6 mi) long. Its westernmost point is called Debeli Art and its northernmost point is cape Brezonjin, where the automatic Stražica Lighthouse is located.

Three km (1.9 miles) southwest of Prvić is the island of Sveti Grgur (or Saint Gregory, also known as Šagargur, its name in the Chakavian dialect), separated from Prvić by the Grgurov kanal (Eng: Gregory's Channel). In addition, three kilometres to the south of Prvić's southernmost point, cape Šilo, is Goli otok (lit. Barren Island). Like Prvić, both Sveti Grgur and Goli otok are today uninhabited.

Prvić's highest peak is Šipovac (357 meters above sea level). Although most of the island is inaccessible as its coastal areas are made up of steep barren cliffs 250–300 m high, the western slope where the lighthouse is located has several gullies through which the island's plateau can be reached. The western side also has several coves which are suitable for swimmers, and near the beach called Njivice on the southwestern part of the island the remains of a medieval settlement owned by the House of Frankopan were found. The sea around the island is on average 70–90 meters deep, with the deepest point being at cape Šilo, where a depth of 107 meters has been recorded.

== Climate and natural history ==
The island is also notable for the bora wind (locally known as bura) which blows in gusts on average 203 days per year, and even reaches force of 11–12 on the Beaufort scale (indicating a violent storm or hurricane-force winds) 73 days per year, according to weather records which used to be kept by the lighthouse crew. Because of this, Prvić is considered the windiest Croatian island. Although the island is uninhabited, it is frequently used by shepherds for pasture and by local beekeepers who keep apiaries on the island. Prvić and parts of the nearby island of Krk are areas with the highest concentration of Common sage (kadulja) shrubs in the entire Croatian Adriatic, and honey produced by bees feeding on the plant's nectar is prized for its quality.

Griffon vultures, a protected bird species, are known to breed at Prvić, and their colony on the island is second in size only to their main breeding ground on the island of Cres, to the south of Prvić. The island marks the northern boundary of their coastal habitat. In addition, there are 17 species of endemic plants which grow on the island. Because of this the island of Prvić is legally protected as a botanical and bird reserve.

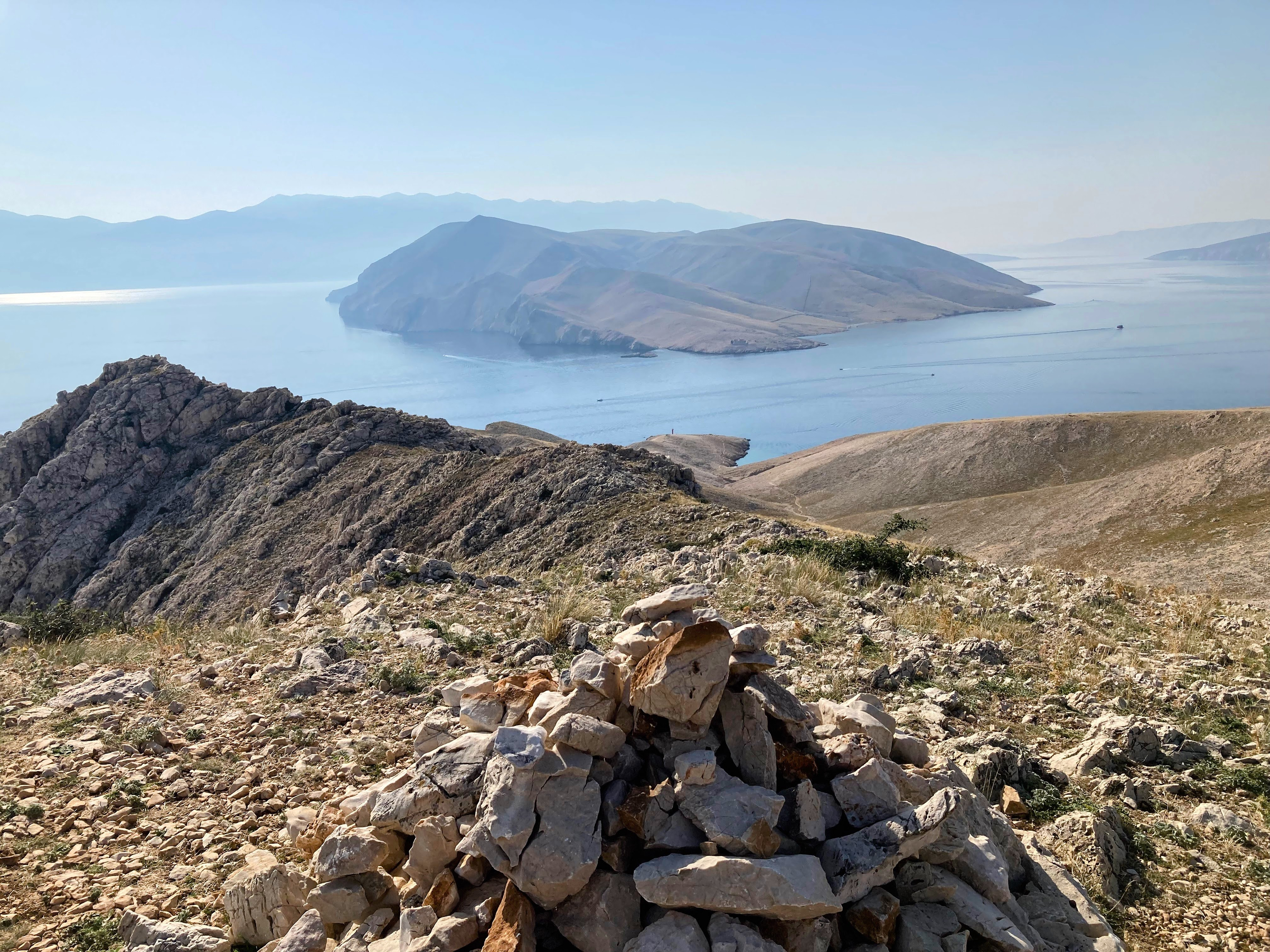
View from Bag

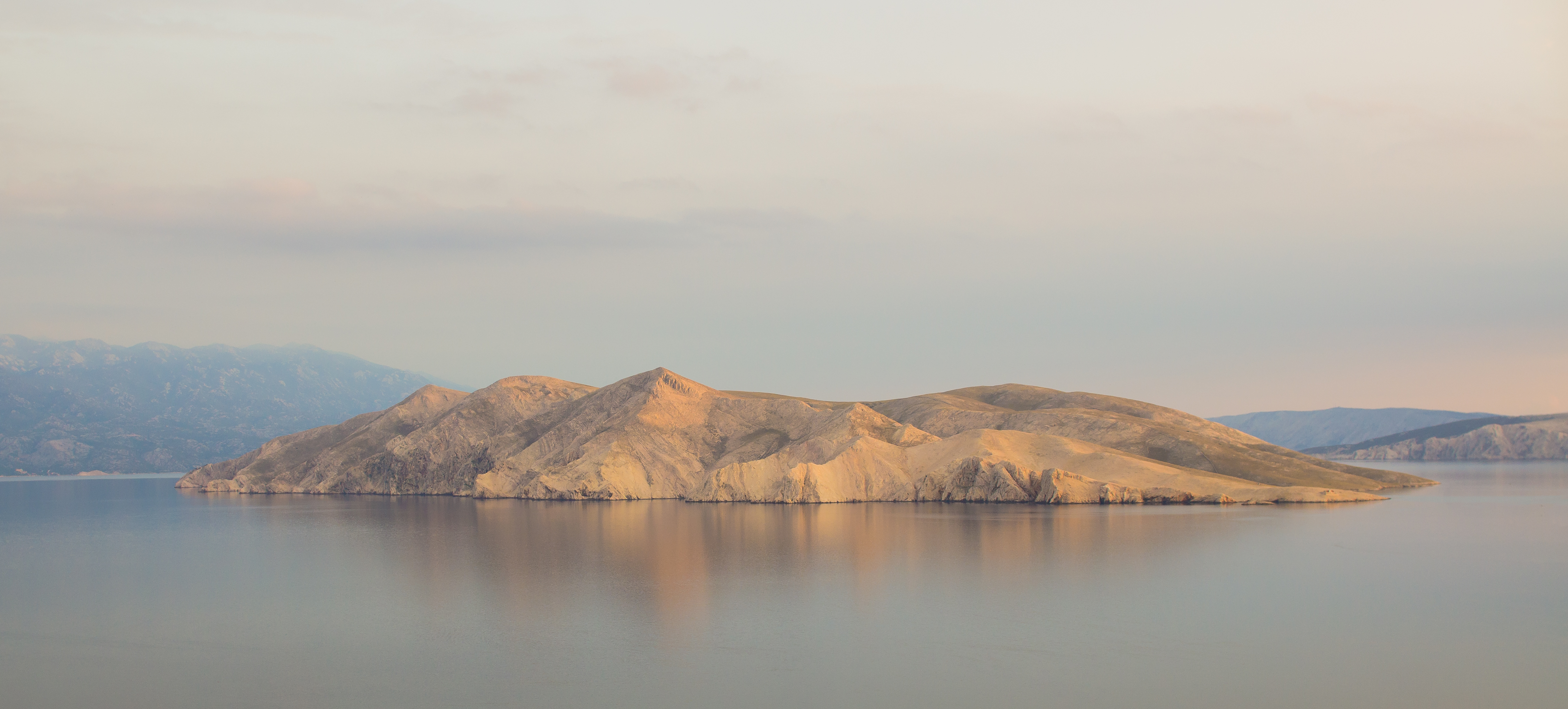
View from Krk (dry season)

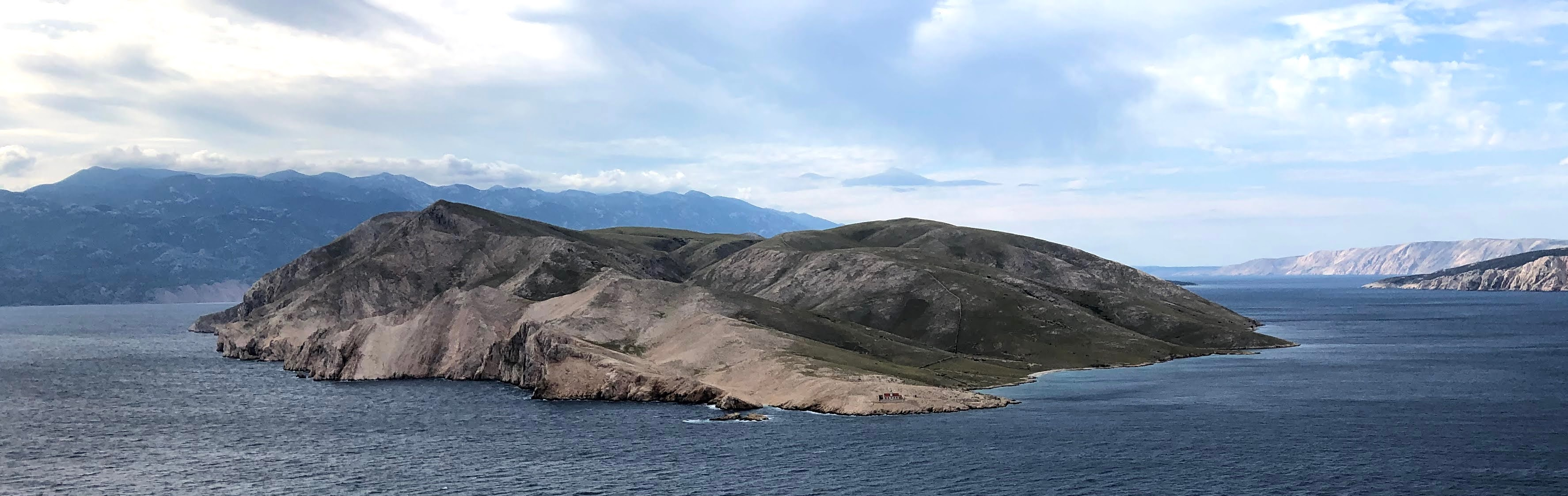
View from Krk (after rain)

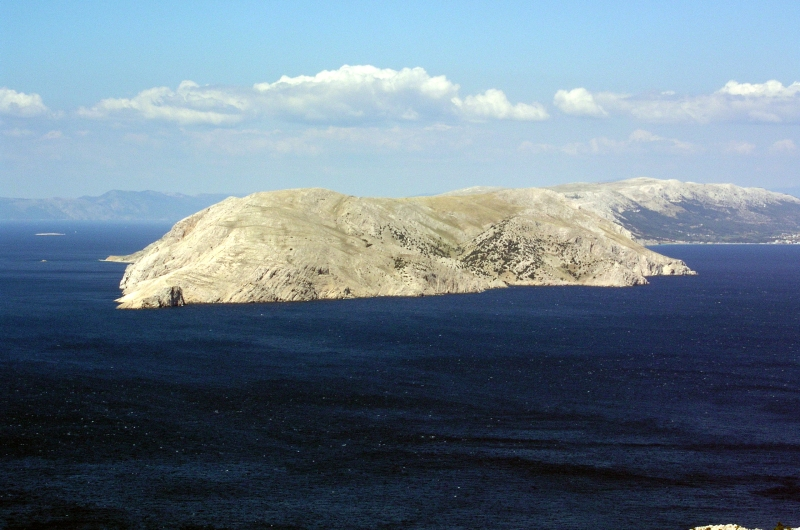
View from Velebit

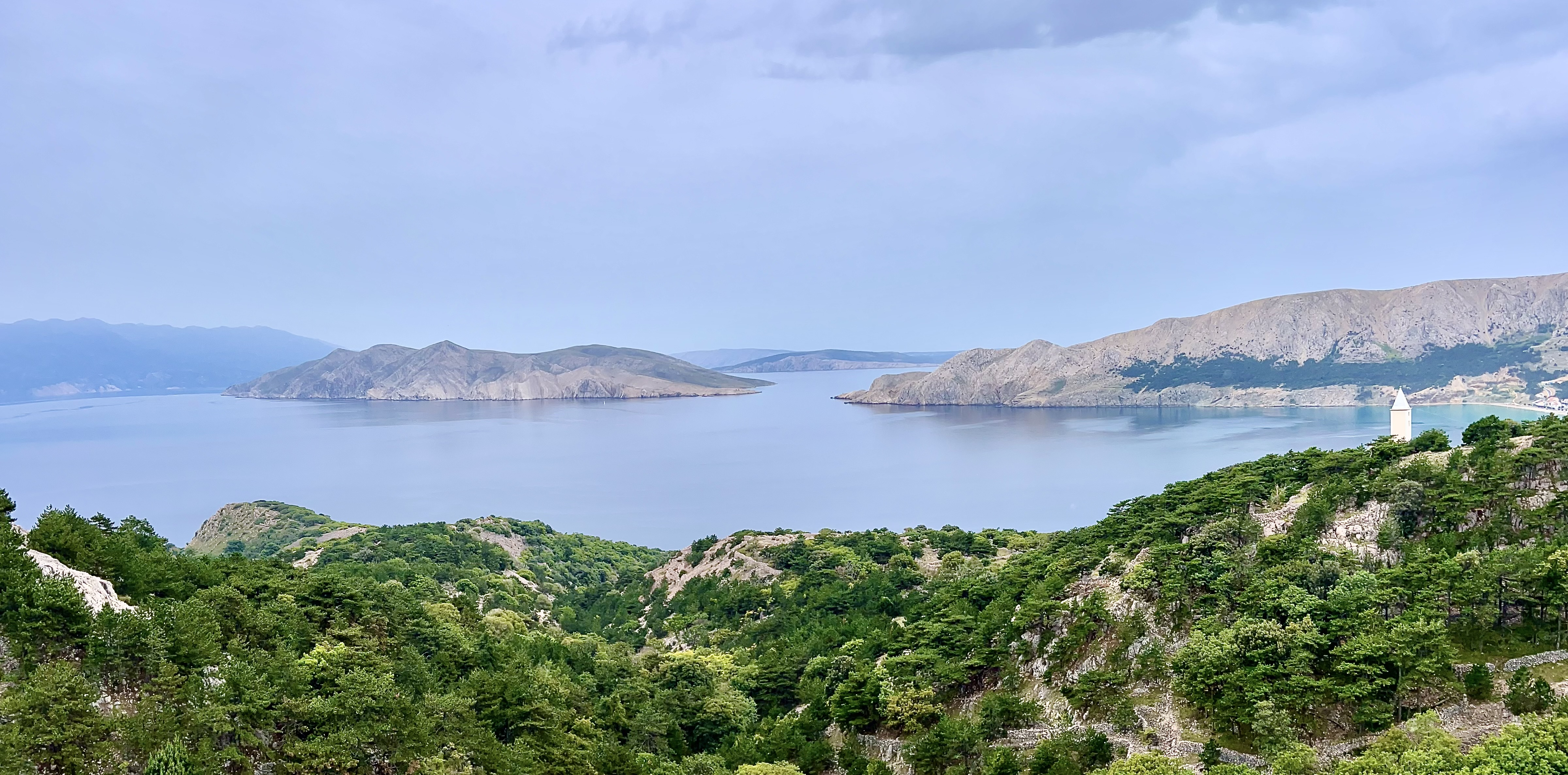
View from the hills above Baška, Krk

== See also ==
- List of islands of Croatia

== Bibliography ==
- DGU (1985a). Hrvatska osnovna karta u mjerilu 1:5000 (Map) (in Serbo-Croatian). § O. Prvić: 5 F 15 - 12.
- DGU (1985b). Hrvatska osnovna karta u mjerilu 1:5000 (Map) (in Serbo-Croatian). § O. Prvić: 5 F 15 - 13.
- DGU (1985c). Hrvatska osnovna karta u mjerilu 1:5000 (Map) (in Serbo-Croatian). § O. Prvić: 5 F 15 - 14.
- DGU (1985d). Hrvatska osnovna karta u mjerilu 1:5000 (Map) (in Serbo-Croatian). § O. Prvić: 5 F 15 - 23.
- DGU (1985e). Hrvatska osnovna karta u mjerilu 1:5000 (Map) (in Serbo-Croatian). § O. Prvić: 5 F 15 - 24.
- DGU (1985f). Hrvatska osnovna karta u mjerilu 1:5000 (Map) (in Serbo-Croatian). § O. Prvić: 5 F 15 - 25.
