= Meneghello =

Meneghello is an Italian surname. Notable people with the surname include:

- Ezio Meneghello (1919–1987), Italian footballer
- Julio Meneghello (1911–2009), Chilean physician
- Luigi Meneghello (1922–2007), Italian writer
- Matteo Meneghello (born 1981), Italian racing driver
- Virgil Meneghello Dinčić (1876–1944), Croatian painter and art teacher
