= Savudrija =

Savudrija Salvore
- Village
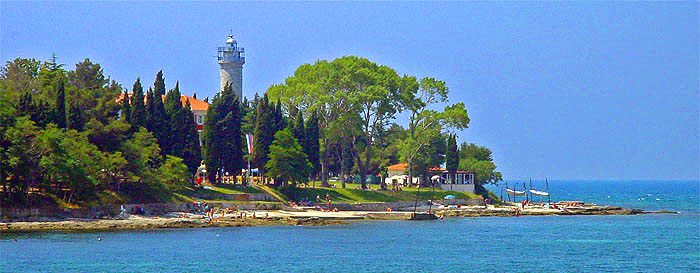

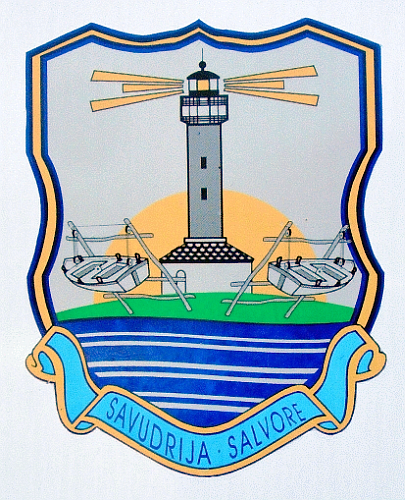
- Coat of arms

- Location within Croatia
- Coordinates: 45°30′3.6″N 13°30′18″E
- Country: Croatia
- County: Istria County
- Municipality: Umag

Area
  - Total: 1.2 sq mi (3.0 km^{2})
- Elevation: 0 ft (0 m)

Population (2021)
  - Total: 195
  - Density: 170/sq mi (65/km^{2})
- Time zone: UTC+1 (CET)
  - Summer (DST): UTC+2 (CEST)
- Postal code: 52475 Savudrija
- Area code: 052
- Website: www.savudrija.net

Savudrija (Italian: Salvore) is a coastal settlement in northwestern Istria, Croatia. It has developed from a fishing village into a pleasant holiday centre. Savudrija is also the name of the surrounding area in the peninsula.

The 19th century Savudrija Lighthouse, designed by Matteo Pertsch, is a distinctive local landmark; it is the oldest in Croatia, and the oldest operational light of the Adriatic. The 29-metre-high (95 ft) lighthouse is also the most northerly in Croatia. Three kinds of wind meet here, so the area is popular with windsurfers.

== History ==
As evidenced by archaeological finds, the Savudrija area has been settled since the Neolithic period. The Roman port facilities still remain intact. In the vicinity of Savudrija are some notable Roman sites, in particular a Roman fort on the peninsula. The village was mentioned in written sources in the second part of the 12th century and was part of the Piran municipality from the 13th century, while today it is part of Istria County in Croatia. On 18 February 1893, Savudrija became part of the Piran municipality.

The territory remained part of the municipality of Piran until 1947, when the municipality of Savudrija was set up. In 1954, when the Free Territory of Trieste was dissolved and its southern part became officially part of Socialist Federal Republic of Yugoslavia, Savudrija was joined to the Socialist Republic of Croatia in accordance with the decisions of ZAVNOH.

== Demographics ==
According to the 2021 census, its population was 195. It was 253 in 2011.

According to the last Austrian census in 1910, almost 79% of the population of the Savudrija territory was Italian-speaking, 14% were Slovene-speaking. During the period of Italian rule (1922–1945), the zone was almost completely Italianized. According to the first ethnic census in 1945, Savudrija had a Croatian majority, with 54% Croats, 30% Italians, and 14% Slovenes. Following the decisions of the Paris Peace Treaty (1947), many ethnic Italians opted to relocate to Italy. Today, Savudrija remains largely Croatian-speaking, but there is a small Italian minority, and most topographic signs are bilingual.

== See also ==
- Savudrija Bay
