= Žirje, Croatia =

Žirje
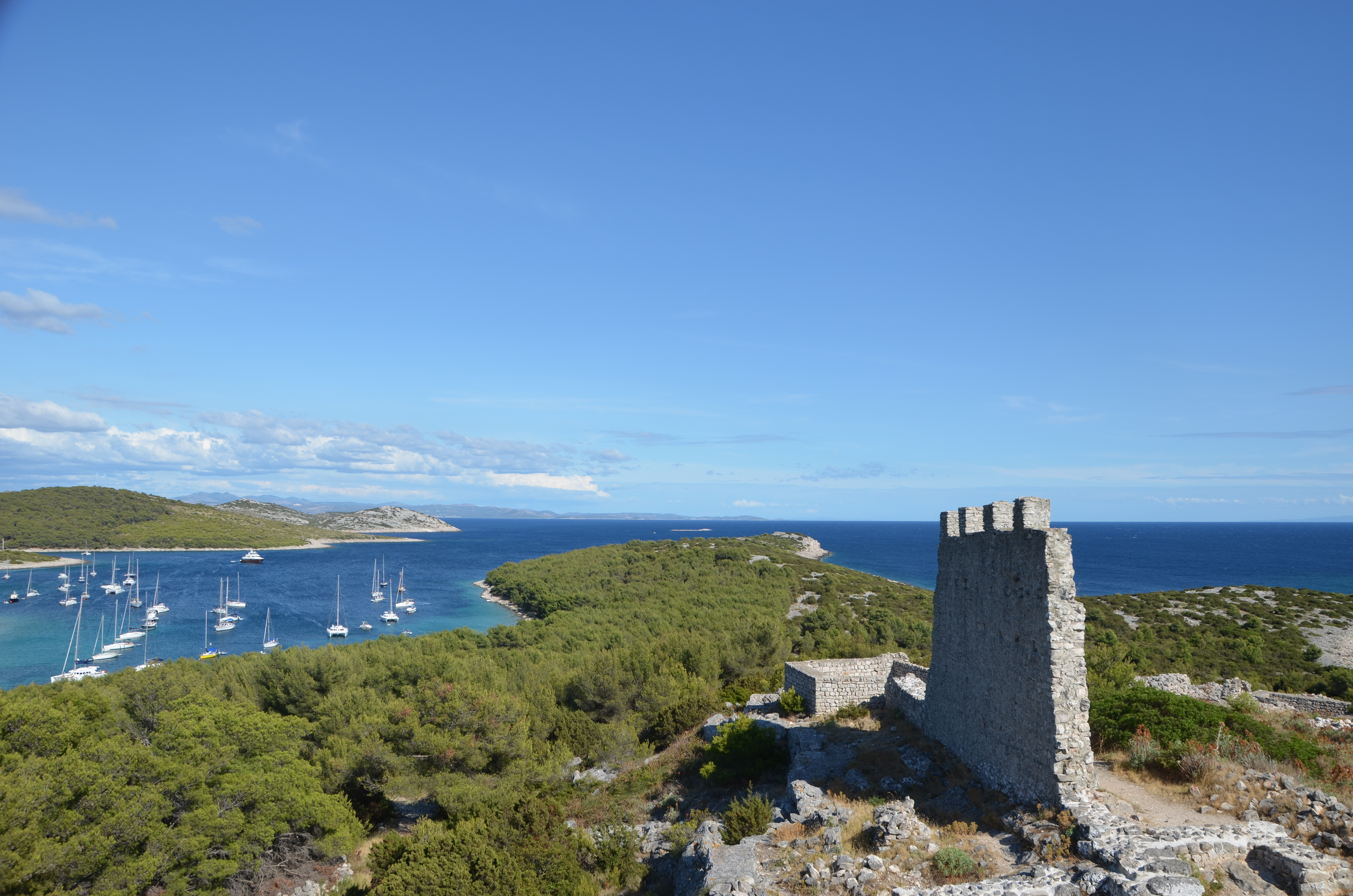
- East side of the island of Žirje, Croatia including parts of the old fortress
- Interactive map of Žirje
- Location within Croatia
- Coordinates: 43.652311°N 15.661636°E
- Country: Croatia
- County: Šibenik-Knin County
- Municipality: Šibenik

Area
  - Total: 15.08 km^{2} (5.82 sq mi)

Population (2021)
  - Total: 147
  - Density: 6.83/km^{2} (17.7/sq mi)
- Time zone: UTC+1 (CET)
  - Summer (DST): UTC+2 (CEST)

Žirje (pronounced [ʒîːrjɛ]) is an island and a settlement in the Croatian part of the Adriatic Sea. It is situated in the Šibenik archipelago, about 22 kilometres (14 miles) southwest of Šibenik, which makes it the most remote permanently inhabited island in the Šibenik archipelago. Its area is 15.08 km^{2}, and it has a population of 103 (2011 census). Its population is steadily decreasing (720 residents in 1953, 207 residents in 1981, and 124 residents in 2001).

The island is composed of two limestone ridges. Nestled between them is a fertile valley. The vegetation of the island is mainly composed of maquis shrubland, with some farm land in the central parts of the island. Main industries are agriculture (grapes, olives, plums, figs and sour cherries) and fishing. Fish are abundant in the waters around Žirje. Tourism on Žirje has remained largely undeveloped in comparison to the other islands in the Croatian Adriatic.

In the 12th and 13th centuries the island was defended by fortresses and walls constructed on the foundations of an earlier Byzantine fortress from the 6th century. Due to its use by the Yugoslav People's Army, the southern and south-western parts of the island were off limits to the islanders and visitors for nearly half a century.

The ferry port on the island provides a link to the county seat Šibenik via the D128 route.

== Demographics ==
In 2021, its population was 147.

Žirje: Population trends 1857–2021
v

population	341	629	453	482	534	661	780	686	766	720	506	336	209	160	124	103	147
	1857	1869	1880	1890	1900	1910	1921	1931	1948	1953	1961	1971	1981	1991	2001	2011	2021

Sources: Croatian Bureau of Statistics publications

== Bibliography ==
- Faričić, Josip; Magaš, Damir (December 2004). "Suvremeni socio-geografski problemi malih hrvatskih otoka – primjer otoka Žirja" (PDF). Geoadria (in Croatian). 9 (2): 125–158. doi:10.15291/geoadria.133.
