= Plovput (Croatia) =

Plovput d.o.o.
- Company type: Limited liability
- Industry: Maintenance of waterways
- Founded: 1992
- Headquarters: Split, Croatia
- Key people: Mate Perišić, PhD (CEO)
- Revenue: 8,250,000 Croatian kuna (2010)
- Net income: HRK 10.0 million (2010) ▲ from HRK 2.1 million in 2009
- Number of employees: 264 (2012)
- Website: plovput.hr

Plovput is a Croatian company, active in waterway maintenance, operation of lighthouses as well as a number of other activities. The additional activities include lease of lighthouses as high-end tourist accommodation. In 2010, net income of the company was 10.0 million kuna, exhibiting an increase from 2.1 million kuna net income reported for 2009. As of 2010, the company employs 263 persons.

The company was founded in 1992 by a decree of the Croatian Government, and is 100% owned by the Republic of Croatia. The company took over all operations previously performed by the Institution for maintenance of maritime waterways, as well as assets operated by the latter company. Current legal status of a limited liability company is held since 1997, pursuant to a special legislation enacted by the Croatian Parliament.

== See also ==
- List of lighthouses in Croatia
