= Diocesan Classical Gymnasium "Ruđer Bošković" =

Coordinates: 42.6393°N 18.1093°E

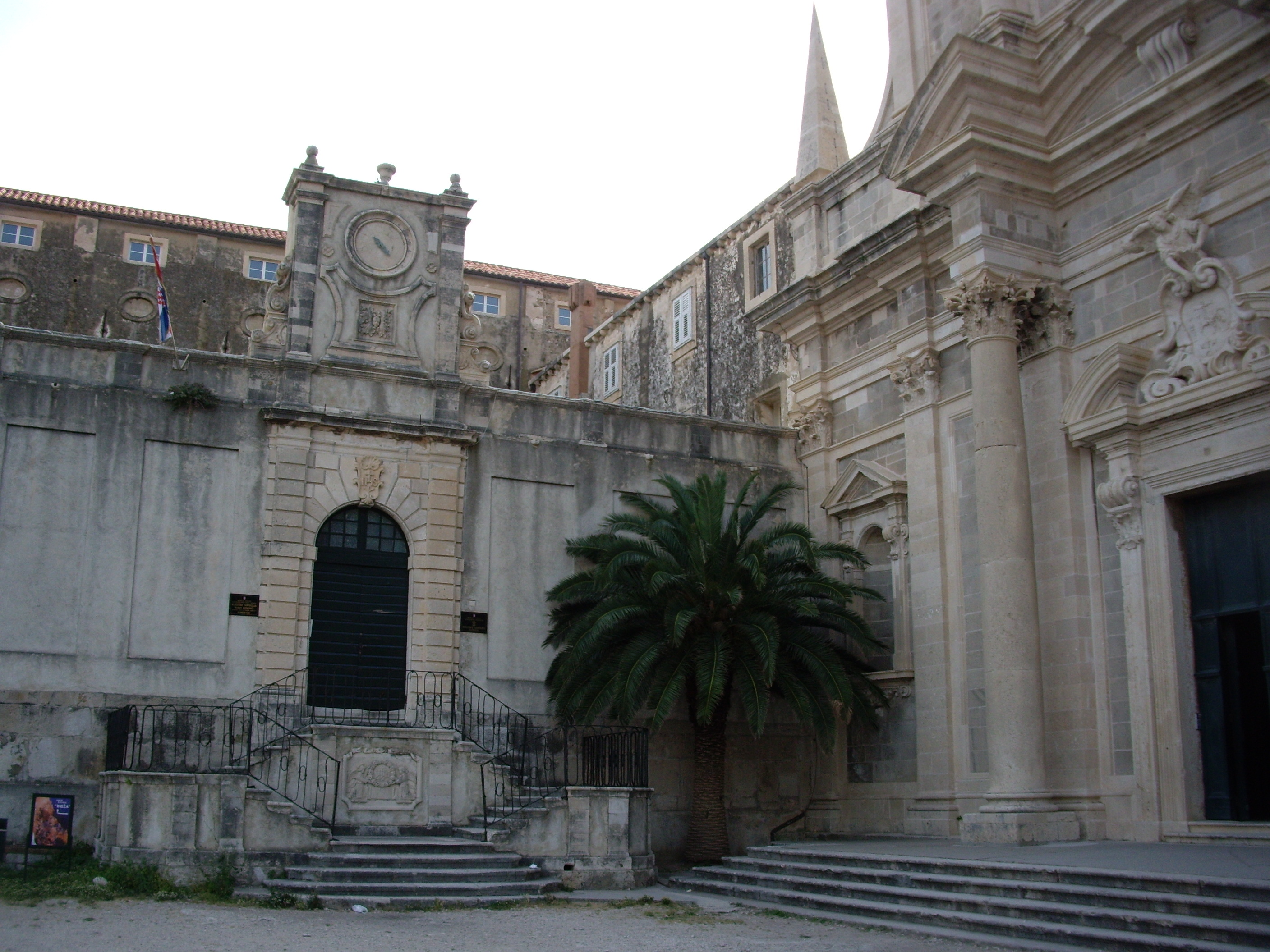
- Poljana Ruđera Boškovića 6 Dubrovnik 20 000; Croatia

Information
- Type: Private
- Language: Croatian
- Campus: Urban
- Website: http://www.gimnazija-klasicna-rboskovic-du.skole.hr

Diocesan Classical Gymnasium "Ruđer Bošković" (Croatian: Biskupijska klasična gimnazija Ruđera Boškovića u Dubrovniku) is a classical gymnasium in Dubrovnik, Croatia. It is affiliated with and operated by the Roman Catholic Diocese of Dubrovnik. It is named after former student Ruđer Bošković.

It is one of the city's oldest educational institutions with roots dating back to a seminary founded by the Jesuits during the 17th century. The Collegium Ragusinum was the first such institution in the city of Dubrovnik. It had a strong tradition in the maritime sciences and is the predecessor of the present-day University of Dubrovnik. In 1941 the secondary school section was founded.

The Diocesan Classical Gymnasium is not to be confused with Gimnazija Dubrovnik, which is a state-funded (rather than church-affiliated) general gymnasium outside the old town.
