= Želimir Puljić =

Croatian prelate of the Catholic Church

The Most Reverend Želimir Puljić
- Archbishop emeritus of Zadar
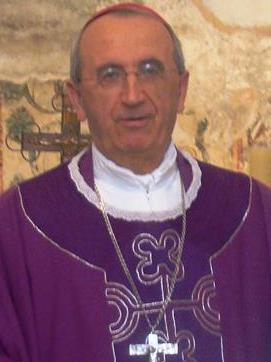
- Archdiocese: Zadar
- See: Zadar
- Appointed: 15 March 2010
- Predecessor: Ivan Prenđa
- Successor: Milan Zgrablić
- Other post: Bishop of Dubrovnik (1989–2010)

Orders
- Ordination: 24 March 1974 by Agnelo Rossi
- Consecration: 14 January 1990 by Franjo Kuharić

Personal details
- Born: Želimir Puljić; 7 March 1947 (age 79) Kamena, Mostar, FPR Yugoslavia (present day Bosnia and Herzegovina)
- Denomination: Roman Catholic
- Education: Pontifical Urban University; Pontifical Lateran University
- Motto: Unitas, libertas, caritas Unity, Freedom, Love
- Coat of arms: Želimir Puljić's coat of arms

Styles of Želimir Puljić
- Reference style: The Most Reverend
- Spoken style: Your Excellency
- Religious style: Archbishop

Ordination history of Želimir Puljić
History
Episcopal consecration
- Principal consecrator: Franjo Kuharić
- Co-consecrators: Ante Jurić I Pavao Žanić
Episcopal succession
Bishops consecrated by Želimir Puljić as principal consecrator
- Petar Palić: 30. travnja 2018.
- Milan Zgrablić: 25. lipnja 2022.

Želimir Puljić (7 March 1947) is a Croatian prelate of the Catholic Church who served as the archbishop of Zadar from 2010 to 2023 and bishop of Dubrovnik from 1989 to 2010. He briefly served as the apostolic administrator of the Archdiocese of Split-Makarska in 2023.

== Early life and education ==
Puljic attended primary school in Blagaj and Mostar and finished school in Pozega, where his parents moved. From 1962 to 1966 he attended classical high school at the Diocesan Seminary in Dubrovnik. From 1966 to 1970 he studied theology in Split and continued his studies in Rome at the Pontifical Urbaniana University. In 1978 he received a diploma in Pastoral Theology from the Lateran University. In addition to his theological studies, he graduated from the Faculty of Pedagogy at the Salesian University of Rome, where he received his doctorate on 12 March 1980.

== Priesthood ==
Ordained to the priesthood on 24 March 1974, for the Diocese of Mostar-Duvno, Puljić was appointed Bishop Dubrovnik on 7 December 1989 and was ordained into that office on 14 January 1990. Bishop Puljić became the archbishop of Zadar on 15 March 2010.

In October 2010, Archbishop Puljić, following up on the wish of his predecessor, conveyed a small silver reliquary containing a portion of the relics of Saint Simeon to Archbishop Theofylactus of Jordan, representative of Theophilos III, Greek Orthodox Patriarch of Jerusalem, for the monastery of Saint Simeon the Godbearer in Katamon, Jerusalem. It is popularly believed that the relics of Saint Simeon, one of the patron saints of Zadar, lie in the Church of Saint Simeon, in Zadar.

On 14 January 2023, the Apostolic Nunciature announced that the Pope accepted Puljić's renunciation from the service and appointed Milan Zgrablić his successor.

== Memberships ==
Puljić served in various capacities in the Croatian Bishops' Conference. He was a member of the Permanent Council of the HBK from 1996 to 2002, president of the Family Council from 199 to 1998, member of the Commission for the Croatian Institute of St. Jerome in Rome from 1997 to 2002, member of the Commission for the Regulation of Relations with the State from 1996 to 2002, and president of the HBK from 1999 to 2002.

He was also president of the HBK Council for Culture and Church Heritage, president of the HBK and BC BiH Council for Croatian Foreign Pesti and a member of the HBK Episcopal Commission for Relations with the European Union.

Puljić is a member of the European Academy of Sciences and Arts.

He was a member of the Governing Council of the University of Zagreb from 1993 to 1995 and a member of the Council of the University of Dubrovnik from 2005 to 2009.

== Notes ==
Catholic Church titles
Preceded by Severin Pernek	Bishop of Dubrovnik; 1990–2010	Succeeded by Mate Uzinić
Preceded by Ivan Prenđa	Archbishop of Zadar; 2010–2023	Succeeded by Milan Zgrablić
