= Milan Zgrablić =

Croatian Roman Catholic prelate

- Archbishop of Zadar
- Church: Catholic Church
- Installed: 14 January 2023
- Predecessor: Želimir Puljić

Orders
- Ordination: 8 June 1986
- Consecration: 25 June 2022 by Želimir Puljić

Personal details
- Born: 29 August 1960 (age 66) Pazin, PR Croatia, FPR Yugoslavia (modern Croatia)
- Education: University of Rijeka Pontifical Gregorian University

Milan Zgrablić (born 29 August 1960) is a Croatian prelate of the Catholic Church who has been the archbishop of Zadar since 2023, after serving a year there as archbishop coadjutor.

== Early life ==
Milan Zgrablić was born on 29 August 1960 in Pazin in the Socialist Federal Republic of Yugoslavia (now Croatia), the fifth child born to a Catholic family headed by Josip and Josipa Zgrablić.

After graduating from the primary school in Pazin in 1976 and studying at the Minor Seminary in Pazin from 1976 to 1978, he attended the Zmajević Minor Seminary in Zadar from 1978 to 1980. He then entered both the University of Rijeka and the Major Theological Seminary in Rijeka, where he completed his work in philosophy and theology in 1986. He was ordained a priest for the Diocese of Poreč-Pula on 8 June 1986 in Rovinj.

== Priest ==
He was parish vicar in Rovinj in 1986/1987 and a teacher and catechist at the Zmajević Minor Seminary in Zadar from 1987 to 1990. He then moved to his native diocese of Poreč-Pula and was the diocesan commissioner for spiritual vocations from 1990 to 1992. He then undertook postgraduate studies in at the Pontifical Gregorian University in Rome from 1992 to 1994, earning a licentiate in spirituality.

Returning from Rome, Zgrablić held the following positions: head of the Pazin College with the Classical Gymnasium (1994–1997); director of the diocesan Caritas (1997–2007); and parish priest in Rovinj (1997–2015). From 2008 to 2022 he managed the Diocesan Institution for the Support of Clergy and Other Church Officials. From September 2015 to April 2022, he was cathedral pastor at the Cathedral Basilica of the Assumption of Mary in Poreč. He was made a canon of the Cathedral of St. Mavra in Poreč in 2019.

== Archbishop ==
On 7 April 2022, Pope Francis appointed him archbishop coadjutor of the Roman Catholic Archdiocese of Zadar. He received his episcopal consecration in the Cathedral of St. Anastasia in Zadar on 25 June 2022 from Želimir Puljić, Archbishop of Zadar. He chose as his episcopal motto the words "i rod donosite" ("and bear fruit"), taken from the words of Jesus in John 15:16: "You did not choose me, but I chose you and appointed you to go and bear fruit and your fruit to remain, and the Father will give you whatever you ask in my name."

He succeeded as archbishop upon Puljić's retirement on 14 January 2023.

Catholic Church titles
Preceded by Želimir Puljić	Archbishop of Zadar; 2023–present	Incumbent
