= Josip Franjo di Paola Nowak =

19th-century Catholic archbishop

The Most Reverend Josip Franjo di Paola Nowak
- Archbishop of Zadar
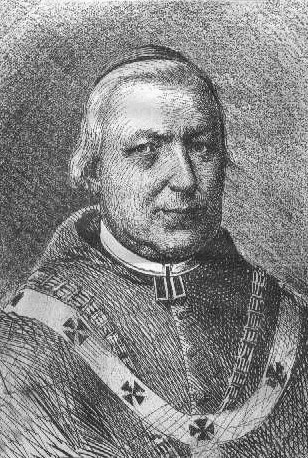
- Archdiocese: Zadar
- See: Zadar
- Appointed: 27 September 1822
- Term ended: 20 Mar 1842
- Predecessor: Josip Grgur Scotti
- Successor: Josip Godeassi
- Other post: Titular Archbishop of Larissa in Thessalia (1843-1844)

Orders
- Ordination: 27 January 1793
- Consecration: 2 January 1823 by Constantin Ernest Růžička

Personal details
- Born: Josip Franjo di Paola Nowak; 5 September 1767 Semily, Habsburg monarchy (now Czech Republic)
- Died: 13 June 1844 (aged 76) Jindřichův Hradec, Habsburg monarchy (now Czech Republic)
- Denomination: Roman Catholic

Styles of Josip Franjo di Paola Nowak
- Reference style: The Most Reverend
- Spoken style: Your Excellency
- Religious style: Archbishop

Josip Franjo di Paola Nowak (5 September 1767 - 13 June 1844) was the Roman Catholic archbishop of the Archdiocese of Zadar.

== Notes ==
Catholic Church titles
| Preceded by Josip Grgur Scotti | Archbishop of Zadar; 1822-1842 | Succeeded by Josip Godeassi |
