= Minuccio Minucci =

Italian Roman Catholic priest

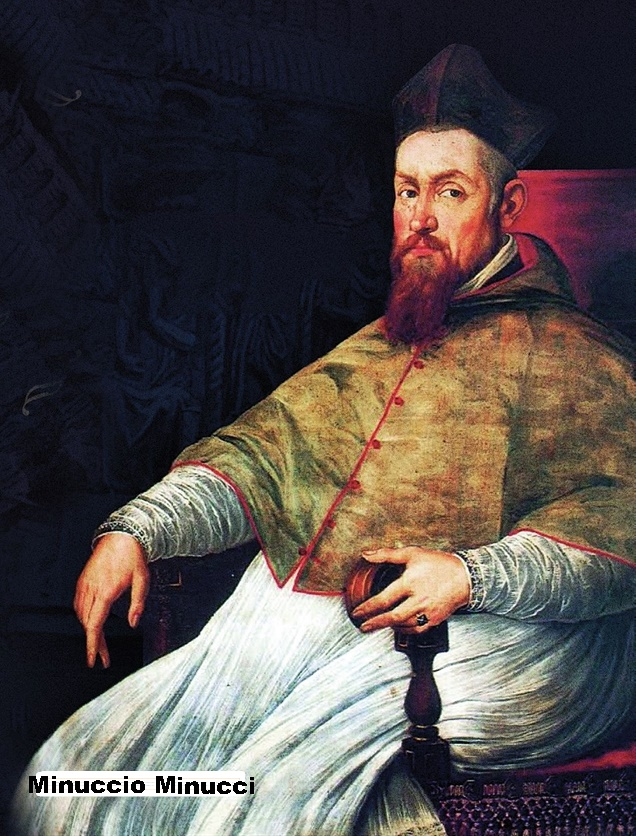
Minuccio minuccii

Minuccio Minucci (1551–1604) was an Italian Roman Catholic priest who was the archbishop of Zadar.

Born in Serravalle on 17 January 1551, Minuccio studied canon law in Padua. He served as secretary to the papal nuncio to Innsbruck, Salzburg and Munich in 1573, and in 1582 attended the Diet of Augsburg as secretary to the prince-bishop of Trent, cardinal Ludovico Madruzzo.

Minucci was named archbishop of Zadar (at the time a territory of the Republic of Venice, now in Croatia) on 7 February 1596 and was consecrated on 10 March.

He died on 7 March 1604 during a visit to Munich, and was buried in St. Michael's Church, Munich.

Amongst other things, he is known as the author of a History of the Uskoks.

== External links and additional sources ==
- Cheney, David M. "Archdiocese of Zadar (Zara)". Catholic-Hierarchy.org. (for Chronology of Bishops) ^{[self-published]}
- Chow, Gabriel. "Archdiocese of Zadar (Croatia)". GCatholic.org. (for Chronology of Bishops) ^{[self-published]}
