= Archdiocese of Zadar =

Catholic archdiocese in Croatia

Coordinates: 44.1159°N 15.2245°E

Archdiocese of Zadar Archidioecesis Iadrensis Zadarska nadbiskupija

Catholic
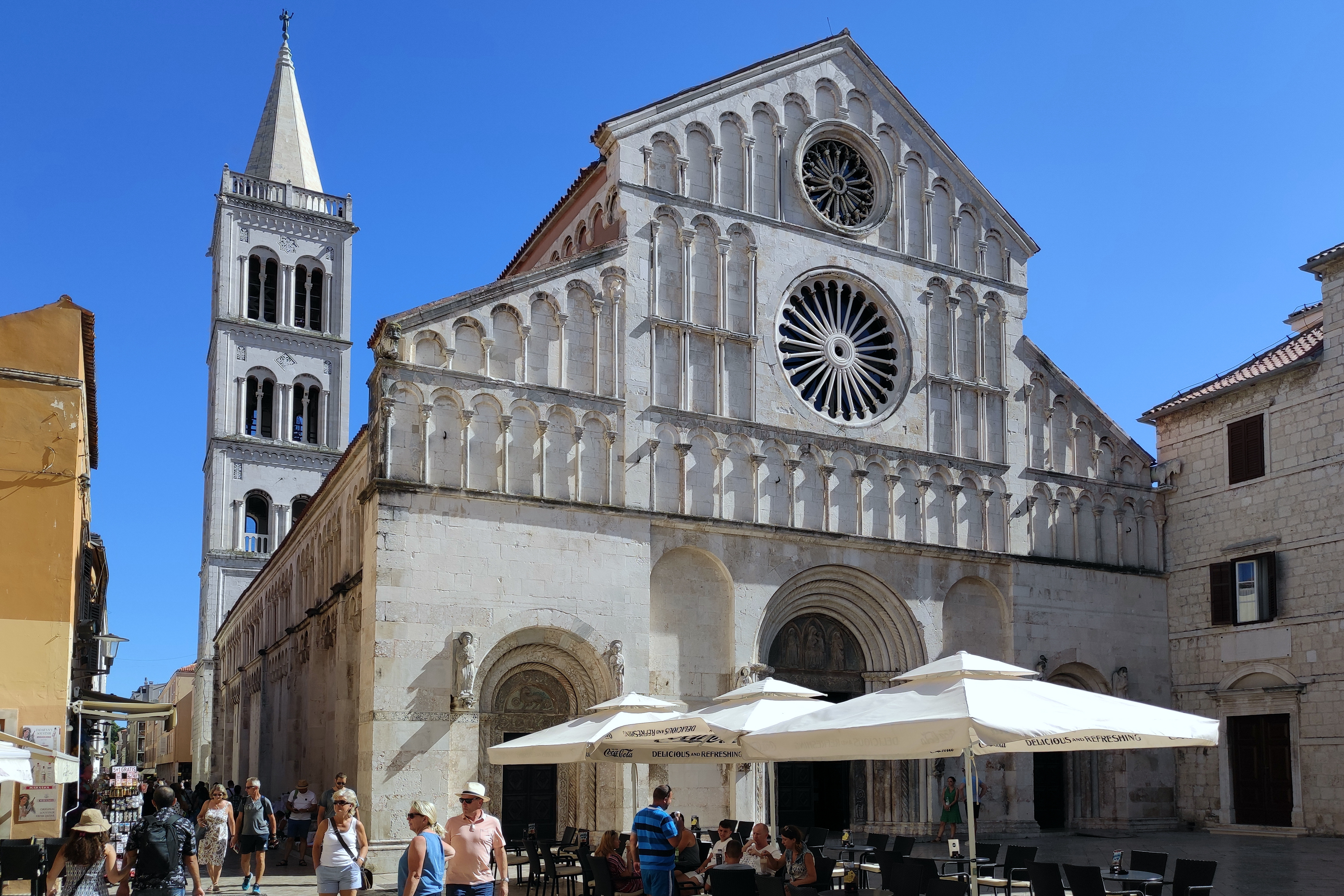
- Zadar Cathedral

Location
- Country: Croatia
- Ecclesiastical province: Splitska
- Metropolitan: Immediately subject to the Holy See

Statistics
- Area: 3,009 km^{2} (1,162 sq mi)
- Population: Total; Catholics: ~164.310; ~151.215 (92.03%)
- Parishes: 119
- Schools: 2

Information
- Denomination: Catholic Church
- Sui iuris church: Latin Church
- Rite: Roman Rite
- Established: • 3rd century (Diocese) • 1154 (Archdiocese) • 1828 (Dalmatian Metropolitanate) • 1932 (Lost status of Metropolitanate; annexed to Šibenik) • 1948 (Archdiocese declared again)
- Cathedral: Cathedral of St. Anastasia
- Saint: Anastasia of Sirmium
- Secular priests: 77

Current leadership
- Pope: Leo XIV
- Archbishop: Milan Zgrablić
- Vicar General: Josip Lenkić

Map

Website
- Website of the Archdiocese

The Archdiocese of Zadar (Latin: Archidioecesis Iadrensis; Croatian: Zadarska nadbiskupija) is a Latin Church ecclesiastical territory or archdiocese of the Catholic church in Croatia. The diocese was established in the 3rd century AD and was made an archdiocese by the Pope Anastasius IV in 1154. As of 2025, it is not part of any ecclesiastical province of Croatia; it is the only Croatian archdiocese directly subject to the Holy See.

== History ==
Zadar (modern Croatia) has been a Roman Catholic diocese in Dalmatia since AD 381 and, since 1146, an archdiocese. Adrian IV placed the archdiocese of Zara under the jurisdiction of the Patriarchate of Grado. Its succession of bishops numbers over eighty without noteworthy interruption. Bishop Sabinianus is mentioned in the "Register" of Gregory the Great. In one of his letters Pope John VIII names St. Donatus as patron of Jadera, Zadar's former name. Archaeologists find in Zadar many traces of ecclesiastical sculpture with German characteristics dating from the migration of the Germanic tribes. Zadar was the capital of Byzantine Dalmatia, but an example of Carolingian architecture is also found there, indicating that Zadar may once have belonged to the Franks and possibly explaining a visit of Bishop Donatus to Charlemagne in Dietenhofen.

Since Zadar belonged to Venice, the bishops of Grado had exercised patriarchal jurisdiction over it. In 1276 Patriarch Ægidius summoned Archbishop John with his suffragans to the Council of Grado where they were, however, represented by deputies. Archbishop Nicholas III of Zadar was present at the synod convened by Cardinal Guido of Santa Cecilia at Padua in 1350. Twenty constitutions were published, chiefly against the civil life of the clergy and the power of the laity as used against the clergy and church property. Worthy of high respect was Ægidius of Viterbo who governed the archdiocese for two years. In the first session of the Fifth Lateran Council he said: "Homines per sacra immutari fas est non sacra perhomines" ("Man must be changed by what is holy, not what is holy by man"). He also addressed the following words to the warlike Julius II, who sought to increase the possessions of the Church:

That the states of the Church number a few thousand more or less, matters not, but it does matter greatly that its members be pious and virtuous. The Church knows no weapons other than faith, virtue, and prayer.

Archbishop Godeassi attended the Synod of Vienna in 1849. Archbishop Pietro Doimo Maupas attended the First Vatican Council.

== Bishops ==
Bishops of Zadar
From	Until	Incumbent	Notes
unknown		Saint Donatus	Legendary
fl. 341		Unknown	
c. 380	390	Saint Felix	Participated in the Synod of Aquileia in 381 and in the Synod of Milan of 390.
fl. c. 391		Sabinian I	
fl. c. 402		Saint Donatus II	
fl. c. 428		Vitalis I	
fl. c. 446		Paul I	
fl. c. 462		Julius	
fl. 464		Unknown	
fl. 489		Unknown	
fl. 518		Unknown	
fl. 530, 532		Andreas I	Participated in the Synods of Salona in 530 and 532.
557	573	Paul II	
574	c. 589	Peter I	
c. 590	600	Sabinian II	
601	c. 611	Guido of Salona	
c. 612	c. 633	John I of Salona	
c. 634	c. 641	John II	
c. 642	c. 673	Jacob	
c. 674	c. 691	Basilius I	
c. 692	709	Demetrius	
710	711	Unknown	
712	745	Unknown	
746	773	Unknown	
774	790	Peter II	
791	c. 800	Damian	
c. 801	806	Saint Donatus III	Diplomat for the city of Zadar. Donatus is mentioned in Frankish annals from 805 as an ambassador of the Dalmatian cities to Charlemagne in Thionville. His feast day is celebrated on 25 February.
807	c. 878	Sede vacante	
c. 879	c. 924	Vitalis II	
c. 925	c. 968	Forminus (Firminus)	Participated in the Church Councils of Split in 925 and 928.
c. 969	c. 977	Basilius II	
c. 978	c. 1017	Anastasius	Together with the clergy and the local people festively welcomed the Doge Pietro Orseolo II in 997 that was called by the Dalmatians to defend the region against Slavic incursions.
c. 1018	1028	Prestanzio I	
1029	1036	Andreas II	
1037	1043	Sede vacante	
1044	1055	Peter III	
1056	1059	Andreas III	
1060	c. 1065	Sede vacante	
c. 1066	1071	Stephen I	
1072	1073	Andreas IV	
1073	c. 1090	Stephen II	
1091	1094	Andreas V	
1095	c. 1100	Sede vacante	
c. 1101	1111	Gregory of Nin	Strongly opposed the Pope and official circles of the Church and introduced the Slavonic language into religious services
1112	1124	Marco	
1125	c. 1137	Michele Caloprestanzio	
c. 1138	1140	Peter IV	
1141	1154	Lampridius	

Archbishops of Zadar
From	Until	Incumbent	Notes
1154	1179	Lampridius	Last bishop and first archbishop
1178	1181	Tebaldo (Teobaldo Balbi)	
1183	1186/1187	Damian	
1187	1189	Peter	Of Hungarian origin.
1190	1197	Sede vacante	
1198	1202	Nicolò Manzavini	
1203	1207	Sede vacante	Zadar was destroyed by the Crusaders in 1202.
1208	1217	Leonardo	
1218	1238	Giovanni Venier	
1238	1238	Tommaso	
1239	1244	Domenico Franco	
1245	1248	Sede vacante	
1249	1287	Lorenzo Periandro	
1288	1290	Andrea Gussoni	
1291	1297	Giovanni d'Anagni	
1297	1299	Enrico da Todi	
1299	1311	Jacopo da Foligno	
1312	1313	Alessandro	
1314	1320	Niccolò da Sezze	
1322	1332	Giovanni di Butovane	
1333	1367	Nicolò Matafari	
1367	1368	Giacomo de Candia	
1368	1376	Dominic Thopia	From the Albanian noble Thopia family of Durrës.
1376	1398	Pietro Matafari	
1398	1398	Antonius Benedicti (Antonio de Benedetto)	Administered the church in place of Pietro Matafari, who was transferred to Ascoli.
1398	1399	John	Appointed by Sigismund, King of Hungary, but not confirmed by the pope.
1400	1419	Luca Turriano da Fermo (Luca Vagnozzi)	
1420	1427	Biagio Molino	Appointed Bishop of Pula on 19 February 1410. Appointed Archbishop of Zadar on 4 March 1420. Appointed Patriarch of Grado on 17 October 1427. Appointed Titular Patriarch of Jerusalem on 20 October 1434. Died in 1447.
1428	1449	Lorenzo Venier	
1449	1449	Polidoro Foscari	
1450	1496	Maffeo Valaresso	
1496	1500	Giovanni Robobello	
1501	1502	Sede vacante	
1503	1503	Alvise Cippico	
1503	1504	Alessandro	
1504	1505	Giovanni Cippico	
1505	1530	Francesco Pesaro	
1530	1532	Giles of Viterbo	Apostolic administrator.
1533	1554	Cornelio Pesaro	
1554	1555	Luigi Cornaro	
1555	1566	Muzio Calini	
1566	1567	Alvise Cornaro	
1567	1572	Andrea Minucci	
1573	1588	Marco Loredan	Apostolic administrator.
1577	1588	Natale Venier	
1589	1592	Marcantonio Venier	
1592	1592	Alvise Barozzi	
1592	1595	Alvise Molino	
1596	1604	Minuccio Minucci	
1604	1615	Vittorio Ragazzoni	
1615	1624	Luca Stella	
1624	1639	Ottaviano Garzadori	
1639	1641	Benedetto Cappello	
1642	1656	Bernardo Florio	
1656	1669	Teodoro Balbi	
1669	1688	Giovanni Evangelista Parzaghi	
1688	1712	Vittorio Priuli	
1713	1746	Vicko Zmajević (Vincenzo Zmajevich)	
1745	1771	Matej Karaman (Matteo Caraman)	
1771	1774	Michele Tommaso Triali	
1774	1801	Giovanni Carsana	
1802	1806	Sede vacante	
1807	1817	Giuseppe Gregorio Scotti	
1818	1824	Sede vacante	
1823	1842	Josip Franjo di Paola Nowak	Of Czech origin.
1842	1842	Antonio Peteani	
1843	1861	Giuseppe Godeassi	Selected Bishop of Split-Makarska on 22 October 1839 and confirmed on 27 April 1840. Consecrated on 8 December 1840. Selected Archbishop of Zadar on 26 February 1843 and confirmed on 22 June 1843. Died on 5 September 1861.
1862	1891	Pietro Doimo Maupas	Selected Bishop of Šibenik on 25 August 1855 and confirmed on 20 December 1855. Consecrated on 25 March 1856. Selected Archbishop of Zadar on 28 February 1862 and confirmed on 21 May 1862. Died on 8 March 1891.
1891	1899	Grgur Rajčević (Gregorio Raicevic)	Appointed Archbishop of Zadar on 17 November 1891 and consecrated on 27 December 1891. Formerly Priest of Dubrovnik. Died on 25 October 1899
1899	1901	Sede vacante	
1901	1910	Matej Dvornik	Appointed Archbishop of Zadar on 4 September 1901 and consecrated on 29 September 1901. Formerly Priest of Split-Makarska. Resigned in 1910 and died on 14 July 1914.
1910	1922	Vinko Pulišić	Appointed Bishop of Šibenik on 9 November 1903 and consecrated on 31 January 1904. Appointed Archbishop of Zadar on 16 June 1910. Resigned and appointed titular Archbishop of Caesarea in Cappadocia 2 April 1922. Died on 28 January 1951.
1922	1932	Sede Vacante	Metropolis of Zadar abolished on 22 July 1932.
1933	1948	Pietro Doimo Munzani	Appointed Apostolic Administrator of Zadar on 13 August 1926 and consecrated on 17 October 1926. Appointed Archbishop of Zadar on 16 March 1933. Arrested by Yugoslav Communists on 7 March 1945. Forced to resign on 11 December 1948 and died on 28 January 1951.
1960	1968	Mate Garković	Appointed Apostolic Administrator of Zadar on 22 February 1952 and consecrated on 30 March 1952. Appointed Archbishop of Zadar on 24 December 1960. Died in office on 26 May 1968.
1969	1996	Marijan Oblak	Appointed Auxiliary Bishop of Zadar on 30 April 1958 and consecrated on 6 July 1958. Appointed Archbishop of Zadar on 20 August 1969. Retired on 2 February 1996 and died on 15 February 2008.
1996	2010	Ivan Prenđa	Appointed Coadjutor Archbishop of Zadar on 29 March 1990 and consecrated on 9 June 1990. Succeeded Archbishop of Zadar on 2 February 1996. Died in office on 25 January 2010.
2010	present	Želimir Puljić	Appointed Bishop of Dubrovnik on 7 December 1989 and consecrated on 14 January 1990. Formerly Priest of Mostar-Duvno. Appointed Archbishop of Zadar on 15 March 2010.

== Deaneries and parishes ==
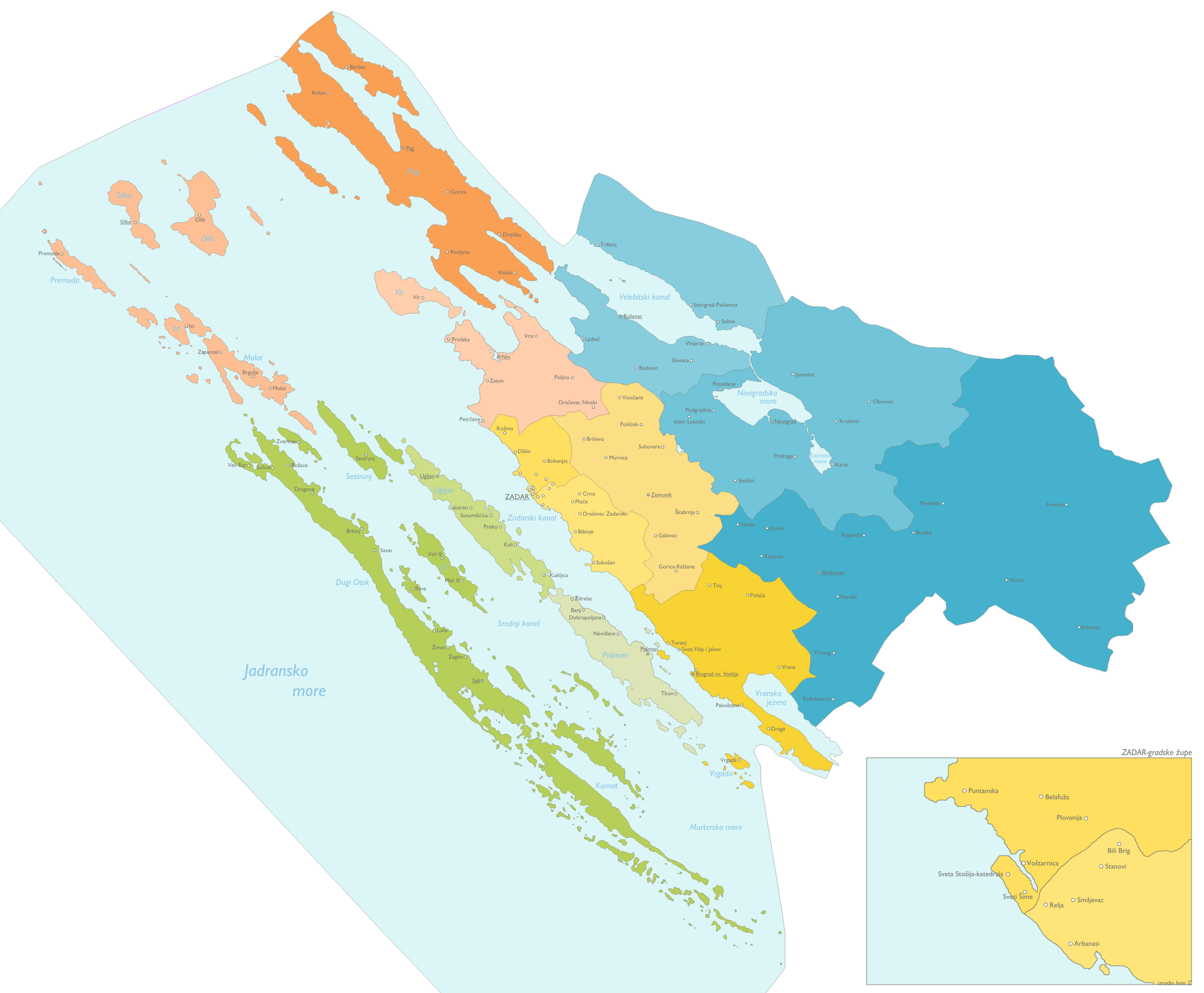
Map of deaneries and parishes

Deanery	Dean	Parishes
Benkovac; Benkovački dekanat	Anđelko Buljat	Benkovac; Bruška; Ervenik; Kistanje; Korlat; Medviđa; Nadin; Nunić; Perušić; Popovići; Pristeg; Radošinovac; Raštević; Rodaljice
Biograd; Biogradski dekanat		Biograd - St. John the Baptist; Drage; Pakoštane; Polača; Sv. Filip i Jakov; Tinj; Turanj; Vrana; Vrgada
Dugi Otok; Dugootočki dekanat	Martin Jadreško	Benkovac; Božava; Brbinj; Dragove; Luka; Mali Iž; Rava; Sali; Savar; Sestrunj; Soline; Veli Iž; Veli Rat; Zaglav; Zverinac; Žman
Nin; Ninski dekanat	Don Jerko Vuleta	Dračevac Ninski; Nin; Petrčane; Poljica; Privlaka; Vir; Vrsi; Zaton
Novigrad; Novigradski dekanat		Islam Latinski; Jasenice; Karin; Kruševo; Novigrad; Obrovac; Podgradina; Posedarje; Pridraga; Smilčić
Pag; Paški dekanat		Barbat; Dinjiška; Kolan; Pag; Povljana; Vlašići
Pašman; Pašmanski dekanat		Banj; Dobropoljana; Neviđane; Pašman; Tkon; Ždrelac

Deanery	Dean	Parishes
Ražanac; Ražanački dekanat	Marinko Jelečević	Ljubač; Radovin; Ražanac; Seline; Slivnica; Straigrad-Paklenica; Tribanj-Krušćica; Vinjerac
Silba; Silbanski dekanat		Brgulje; Ist; Molat; Olib; Premuda; Silba; Zapuntel
Ugljan; Ugljanski dekanat	Mario Soljačić	Kali; Kukljica; Lukoran; Preko; Sutomišćica-Poljana; Ugljan
Zadar-East; Zadar-istok	Tomislav Sikirić	Arbanasi (Our Lady of Loreto); Bibinje; Bili Brig (Bl. Aloysius Stepinac); Crno; Dračevac Zadarski; Ploče (St. Peter); Relja (St. John the Baptist); Smiljevac (St. Anthony of Padua); Stanovi (Queen of Peace); Sukošan
Zadar-West; Zadar-zapad	Igor Ikić	Belafuža (Assumption); Bokanjac; Diklo; Kožino; Plovanija (St. Joseph); Puntamika (Immaculate Conception); St. Simeon-Zadar (Sveti Šime-Zadar); St. Anastasia-Cathedral (Sveta Stošija-Katedrala); Voštarnica (Sacred Heart)
Zemunik; Zemunički dekanat		Briševo; Galovac; Gorica-Raštane; Murvica; Poličnik; Škabrnja; Suhovare; Visočane; Zemunik

== Gallery ==
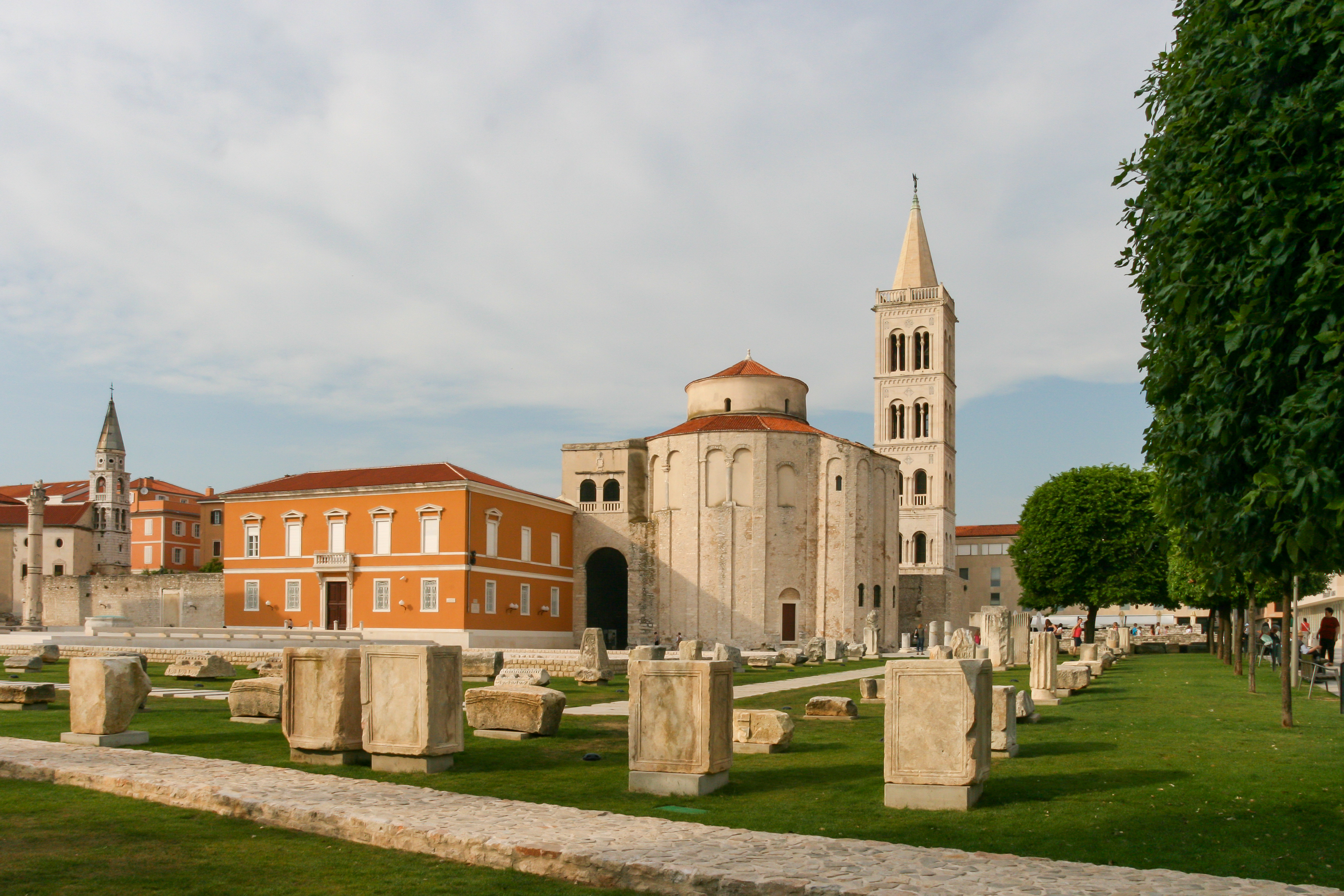
Church of St. Donatus and Archbishops palace (orange building)

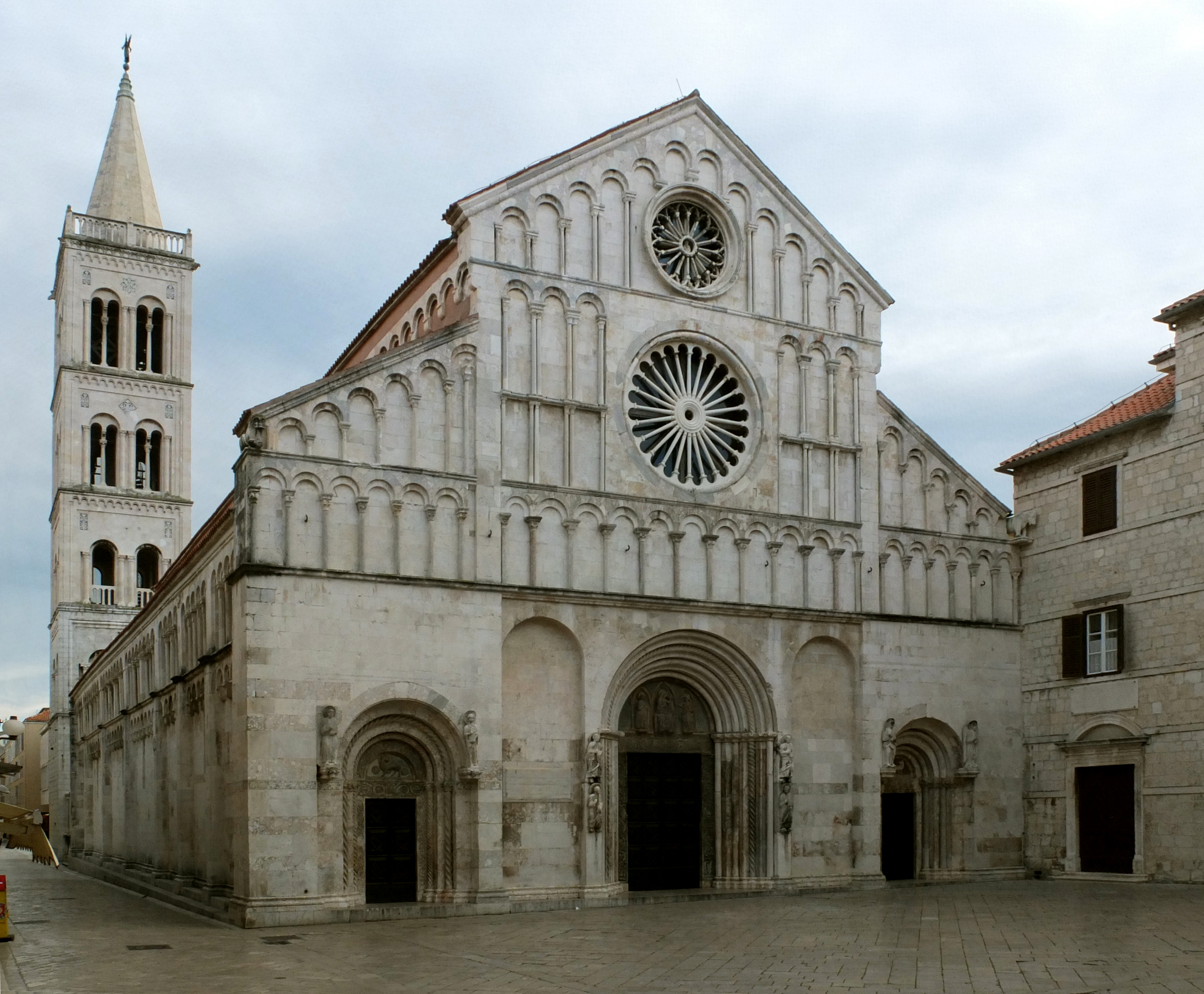
St. Anastasia Cathedral

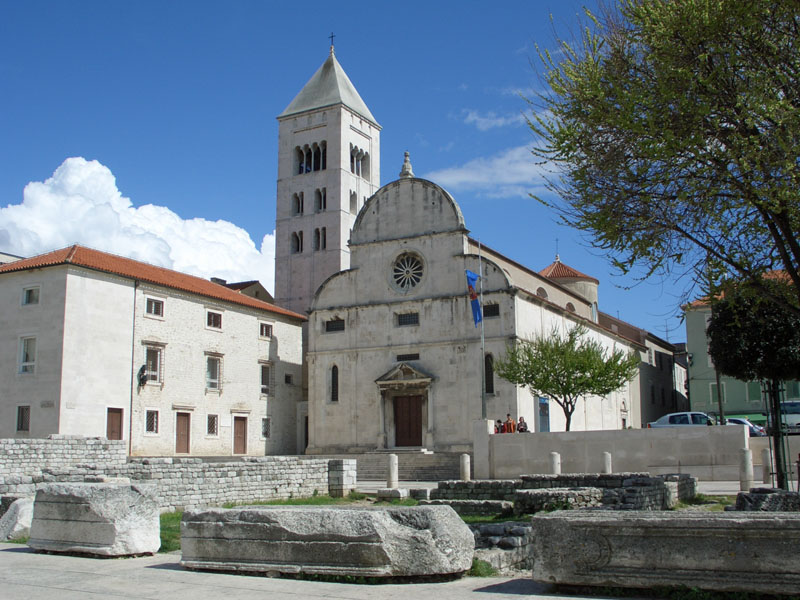
Benedictine monastery of St. Mary

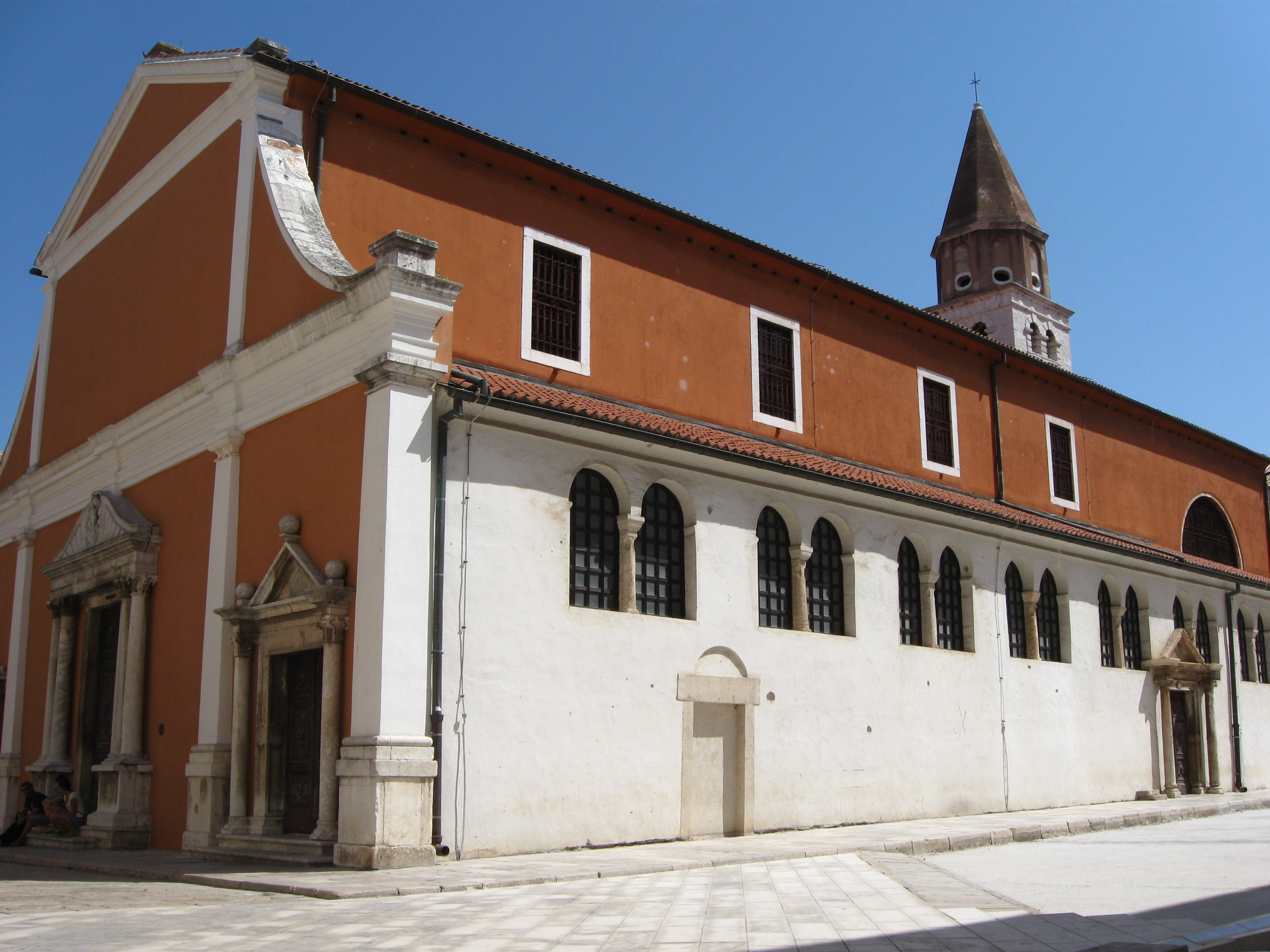
St. Simeon's Church

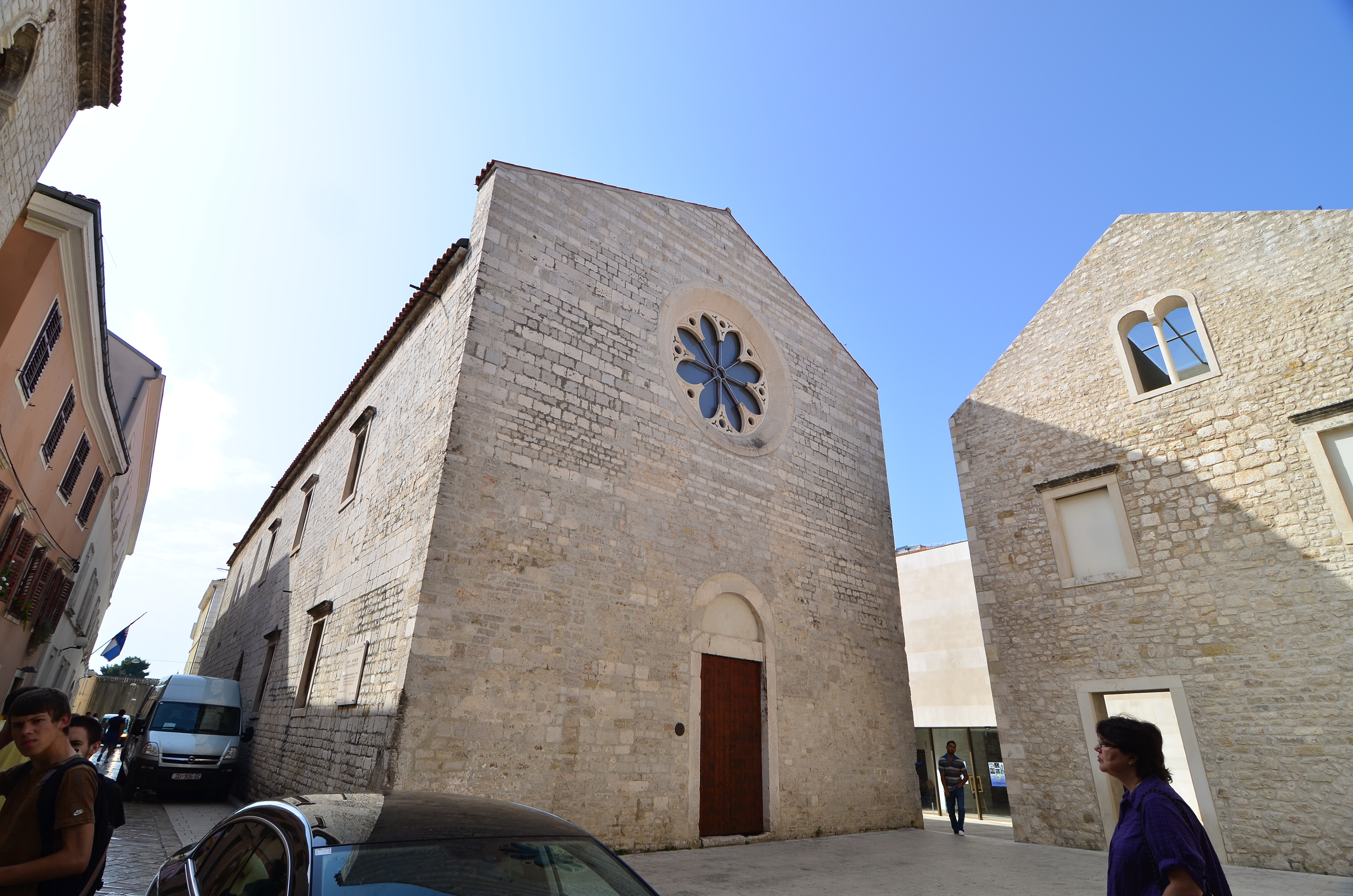
St Dominic's Church

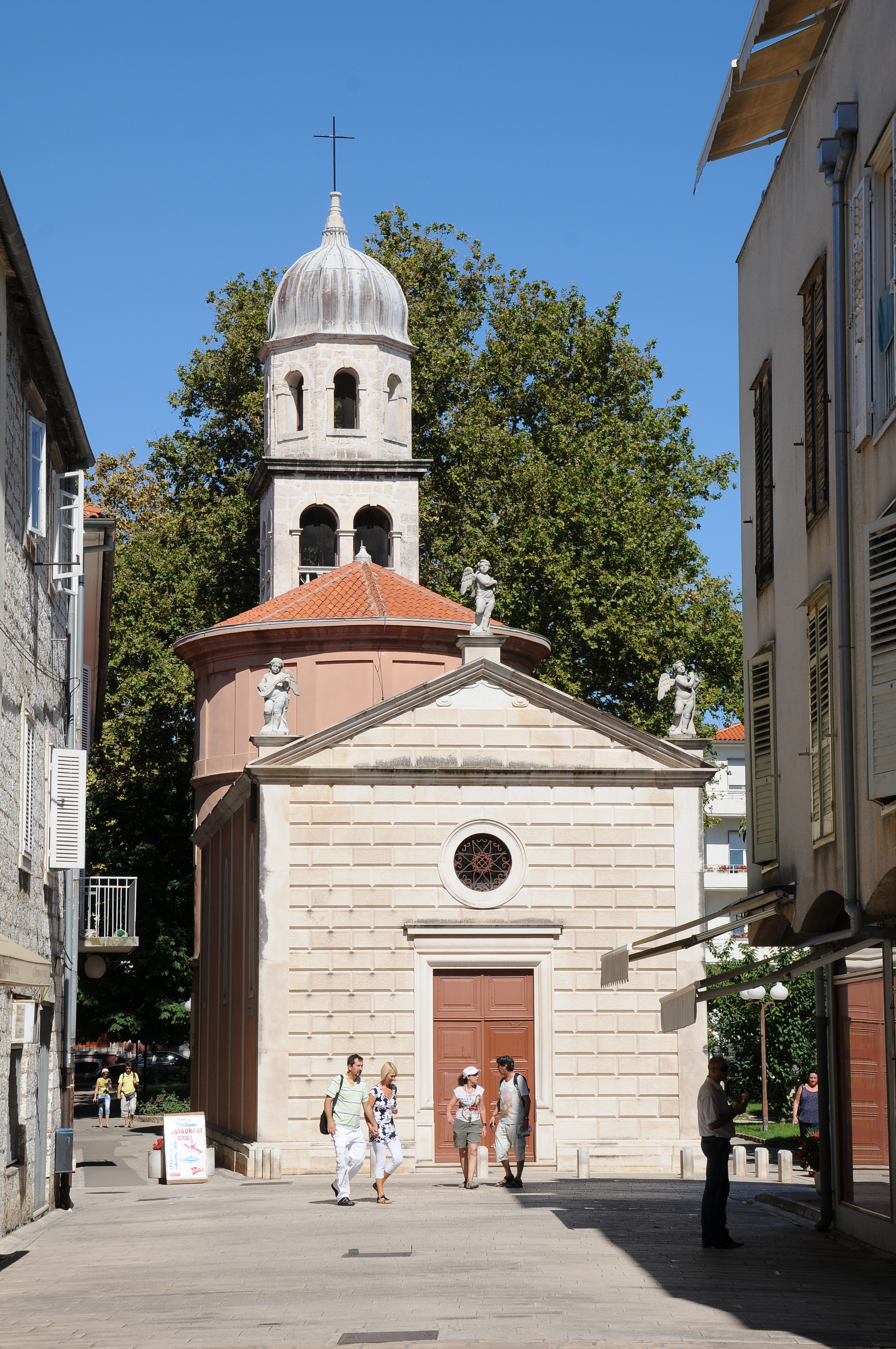
Church of Our Lady of Health

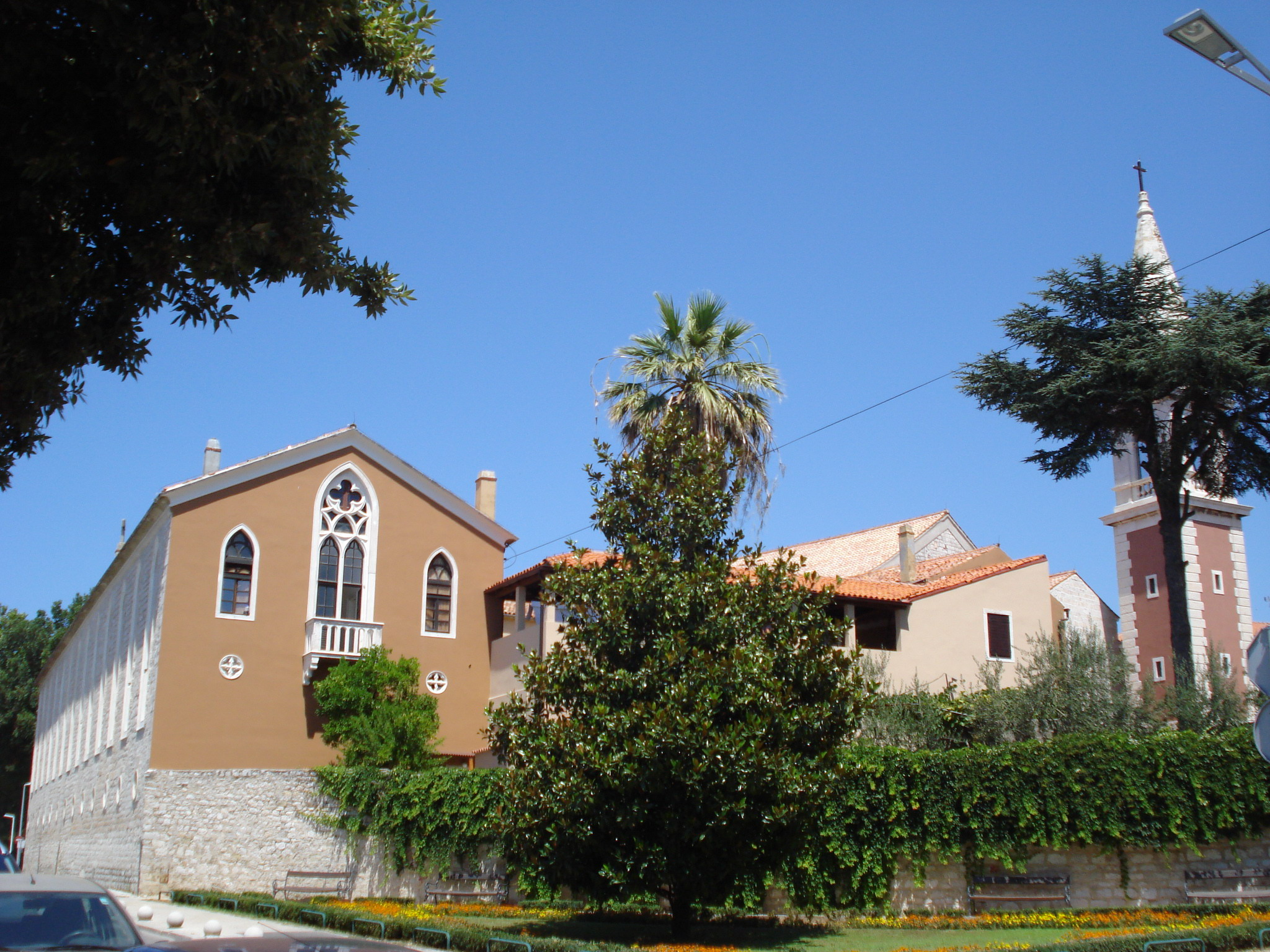
Monastery of St. Francis Assisi (Zadar)

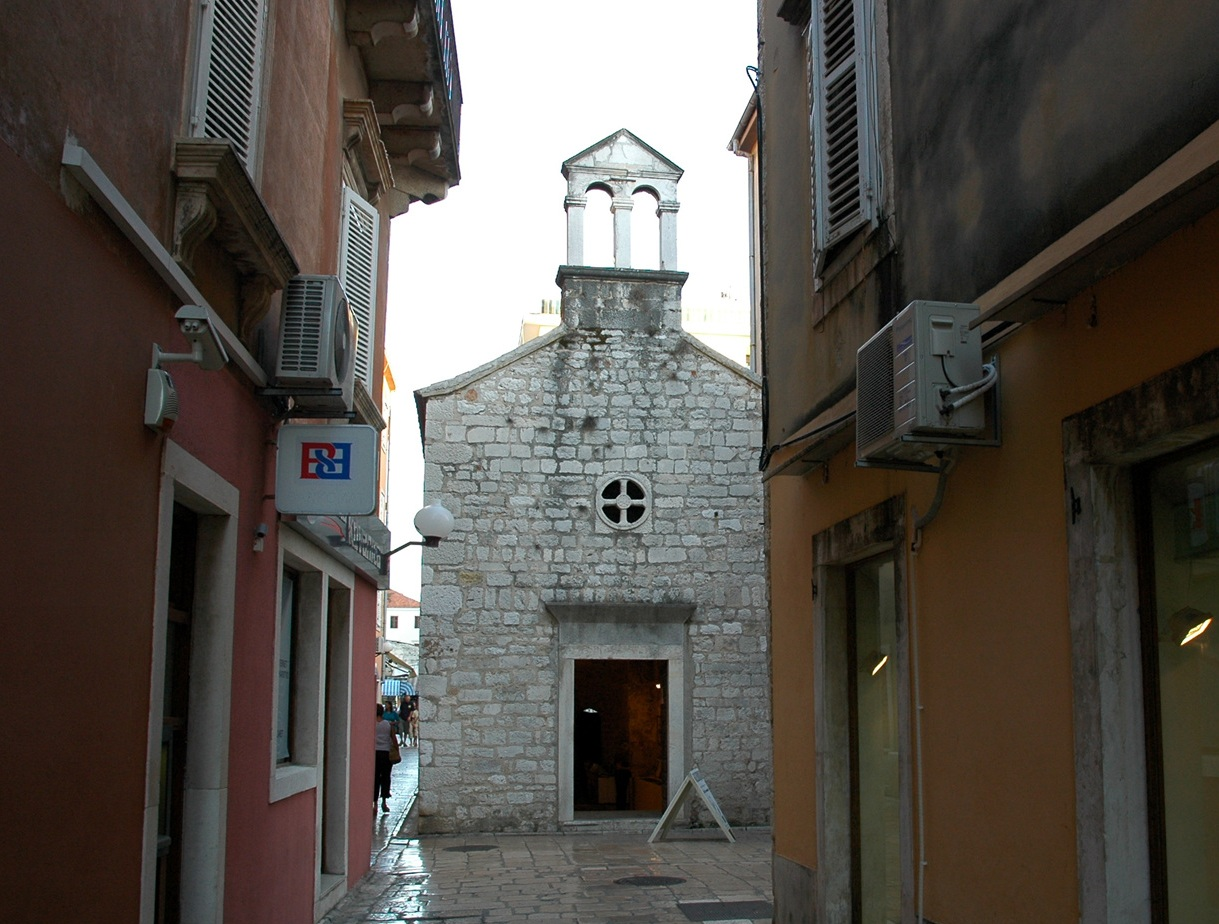
Church of St Andrew's and St Peter the Elder's

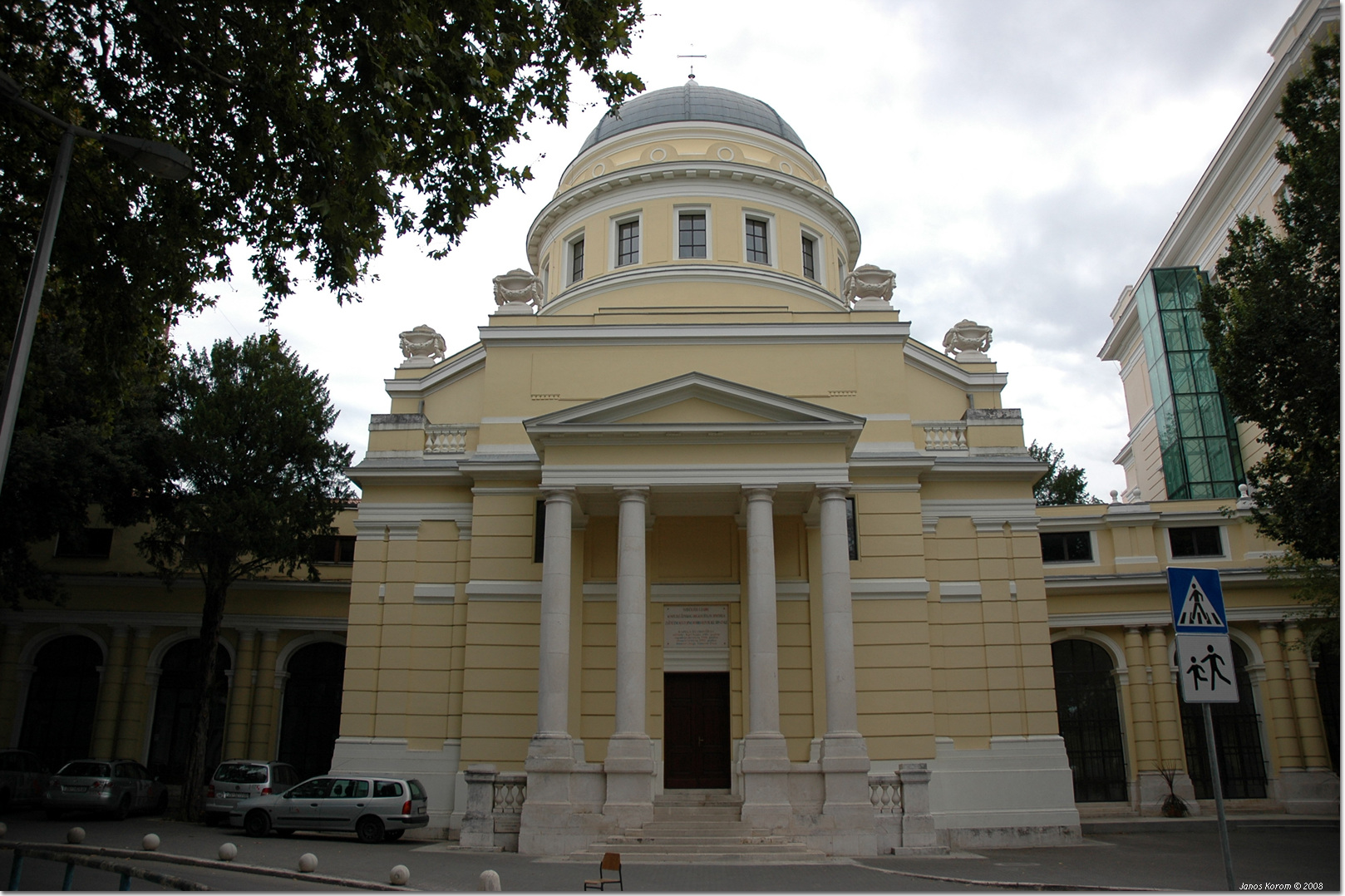
Chapel of St Demetrius

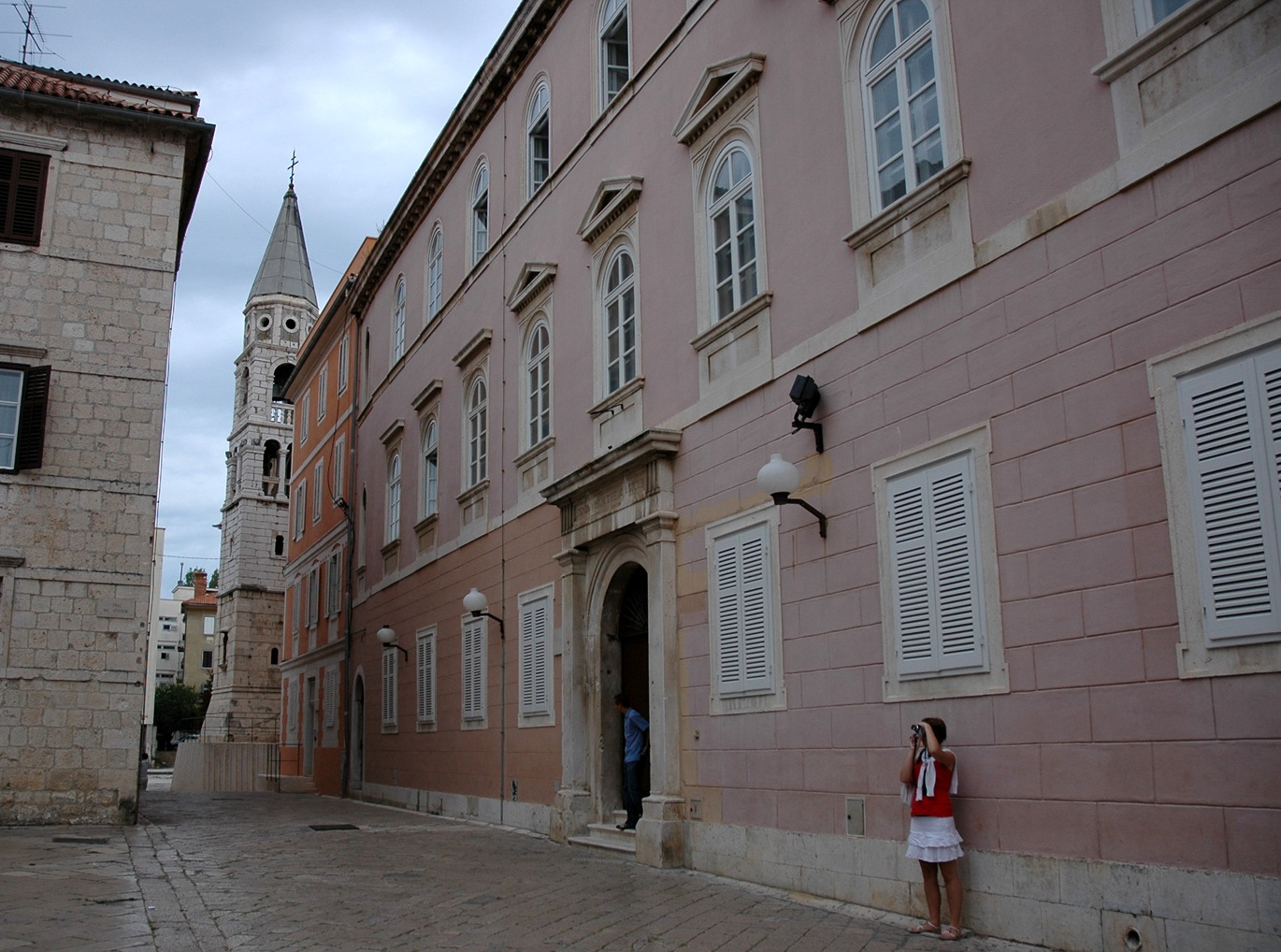
Archdiocesan seminary

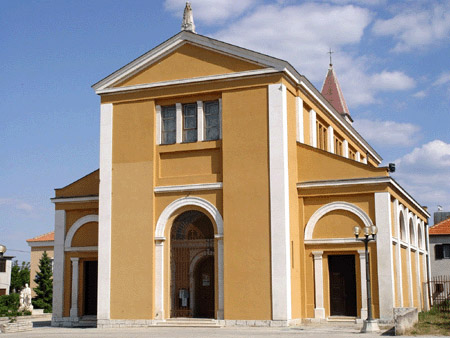
Church of Our Lady of Loreto in Arbanasi

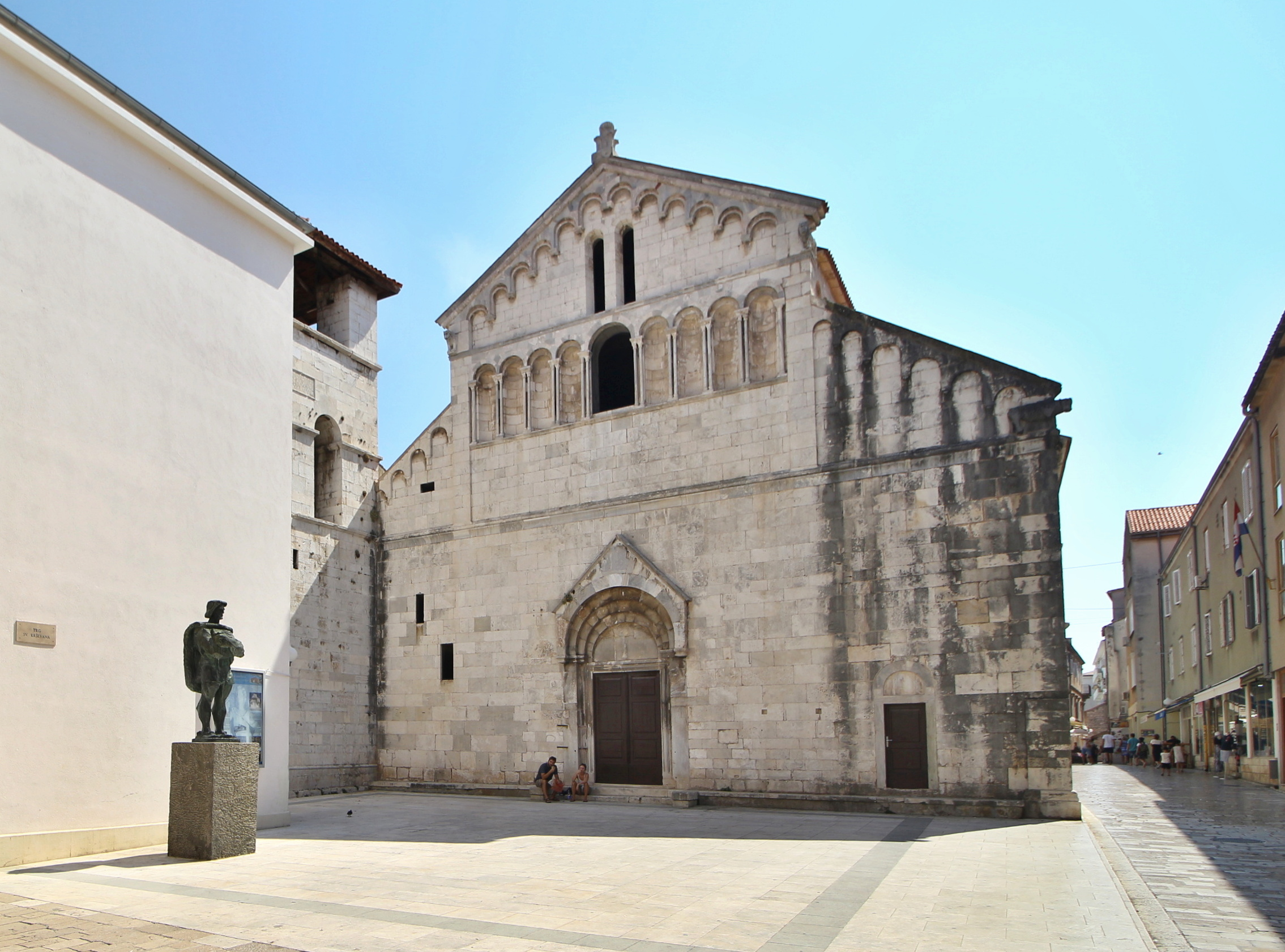
Church of St. Grisogono

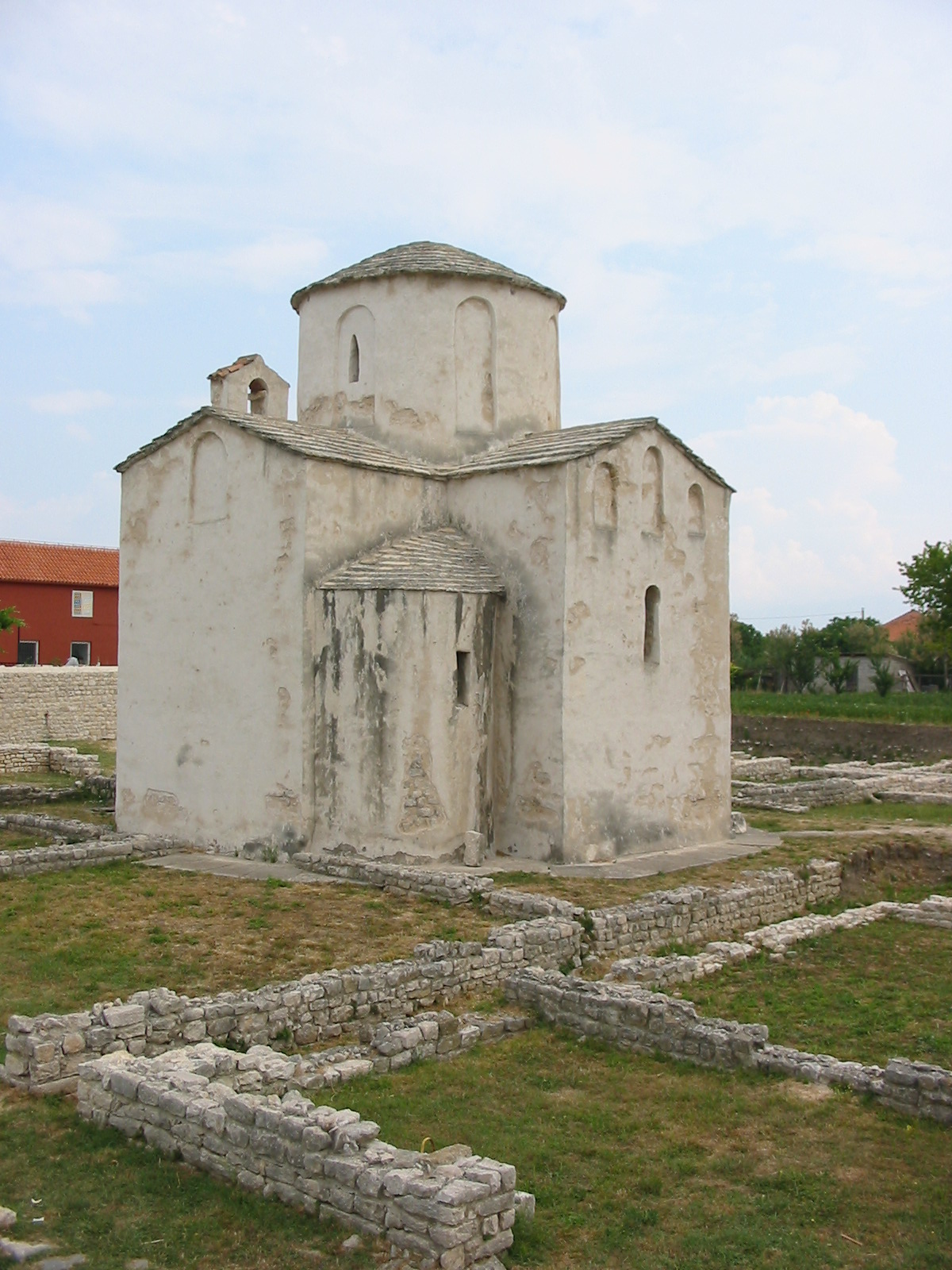
Church of the Holy Cross in Nin

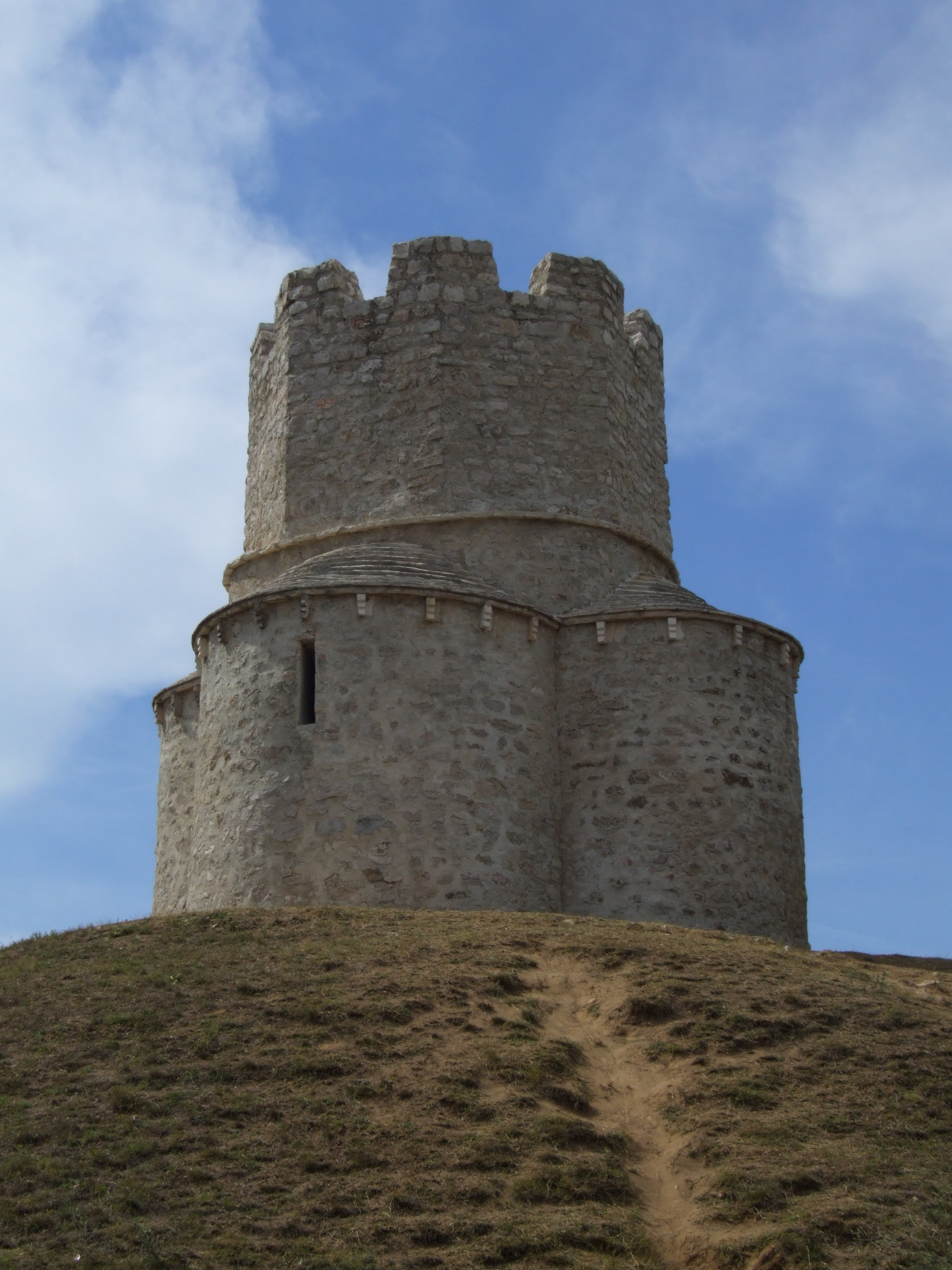
Church of St. Nicholas in Nin

== See also ==
- The church and monastery of St. Michael in Zadar - Croatia
