= St. Michael's Church (Zadar) =

Roman Catholic church and monastery in Zadar, Croatia

The church and monastery of St. Michael are situated in the very center of Zadar, between the main town square - People's square ( "Narodni trg" - Croatian) and the street which is called "Varoš" (Croatian). The usual nickname of the church is "The main place for confession in Zadar".

== Description ==
The monastery is situated just above the church. It is the home of the friars of the Third Order of St. Francesco (TOR - Tertius Ordo Regularis). They usually wear black habits and therefore they are known as the "Black friars".

The Third order of St. Francesco in Zadar has a long history. In center of Zadar; they are first mentioned in a year of 1150.

In 1387 they were living in part of Zadar also known as Polačišće.

During the attacks of the Ottoman Empire, that monastery was abandoned and ruined by the decision of Zadar's town hall in 1537. So the friars moved to the monastery of St. John the Baptist which was situated only about hundred meters from its current place. They lived and worked there from 1541 to 1806.

The friars moved to their current monastery and church of St. Michael in 1818.

The Third Order of St Francis are well known in Croatia for nursing the Croatian Glagolitic heritage - Croatian Old Church Slavic religious service or liturgy.

Nowadays, members of fraternity are:

- friar Božo Bugarija
- friar Edi Ricov,
- friar Nikola Nižić
- friar Alojzije Duvnjak

The guardian is friar Miroslav Barun

== See also ==
- Roman Catholic Archdiocese of Zadar
