= Collegium Ragusinum =

Jesuit college in Dubrovnik

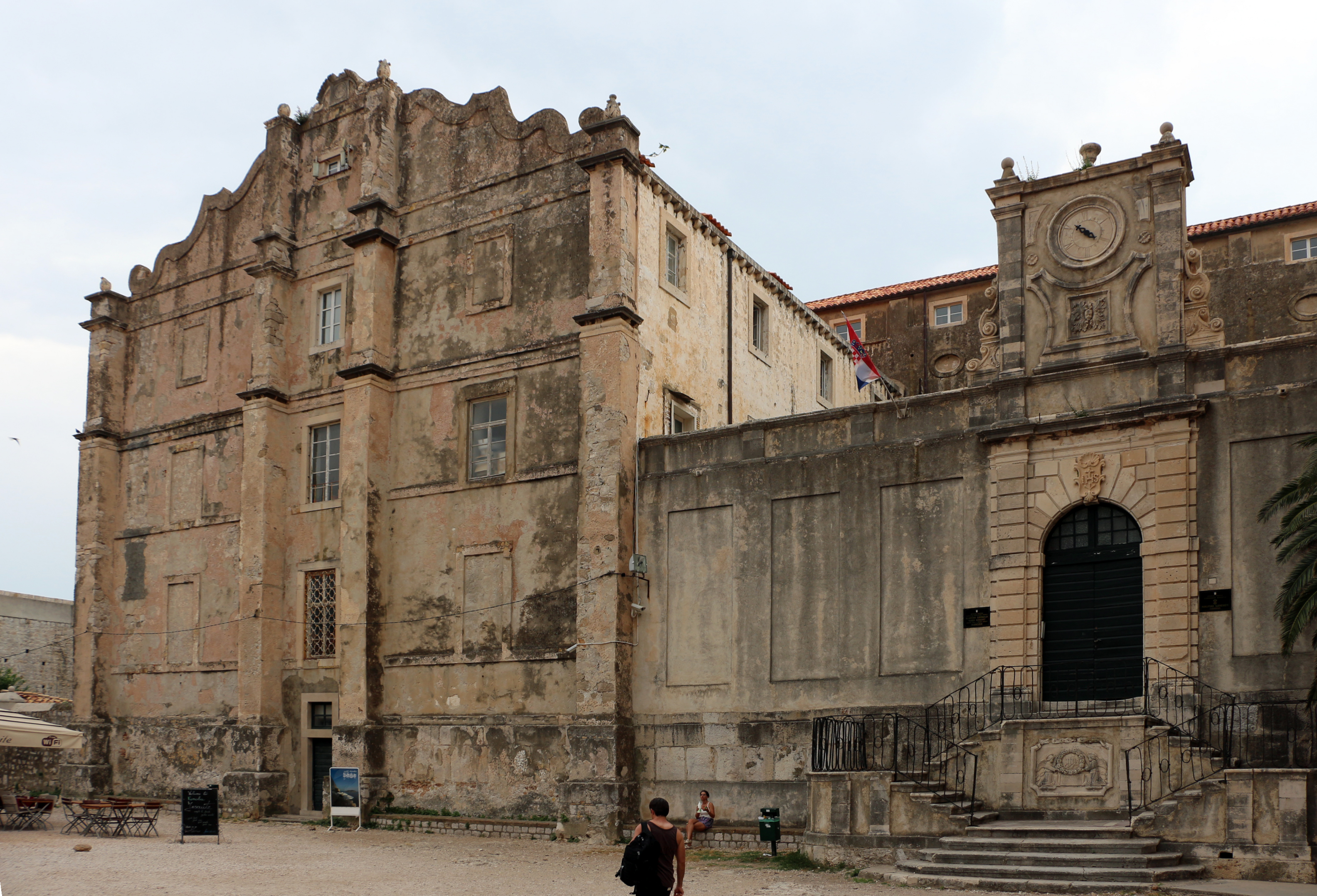
College buildings on Dubrovnik's Boscovich Square

The Collegium Ragusinum, sometimes also Rhagusinum, was the Jesuit college in the Republic of Ragusa, now the city of Dubrovnik in Croatia. Following early Jesuit presence in Ragusa in the late 1550s, the college was established in 1658 and closed in 1773 with the suppression of the Society of Jesus. Its preserved church is dedicated to Saint Ignatius, and the other buildings now host a Catholic gymnasium and other Church facilities. The complex has been referred to as "considered to be the finest Baroque set of buildings in Dubrovnik, and - according to many - in all of Dalmatia."

== Location ==
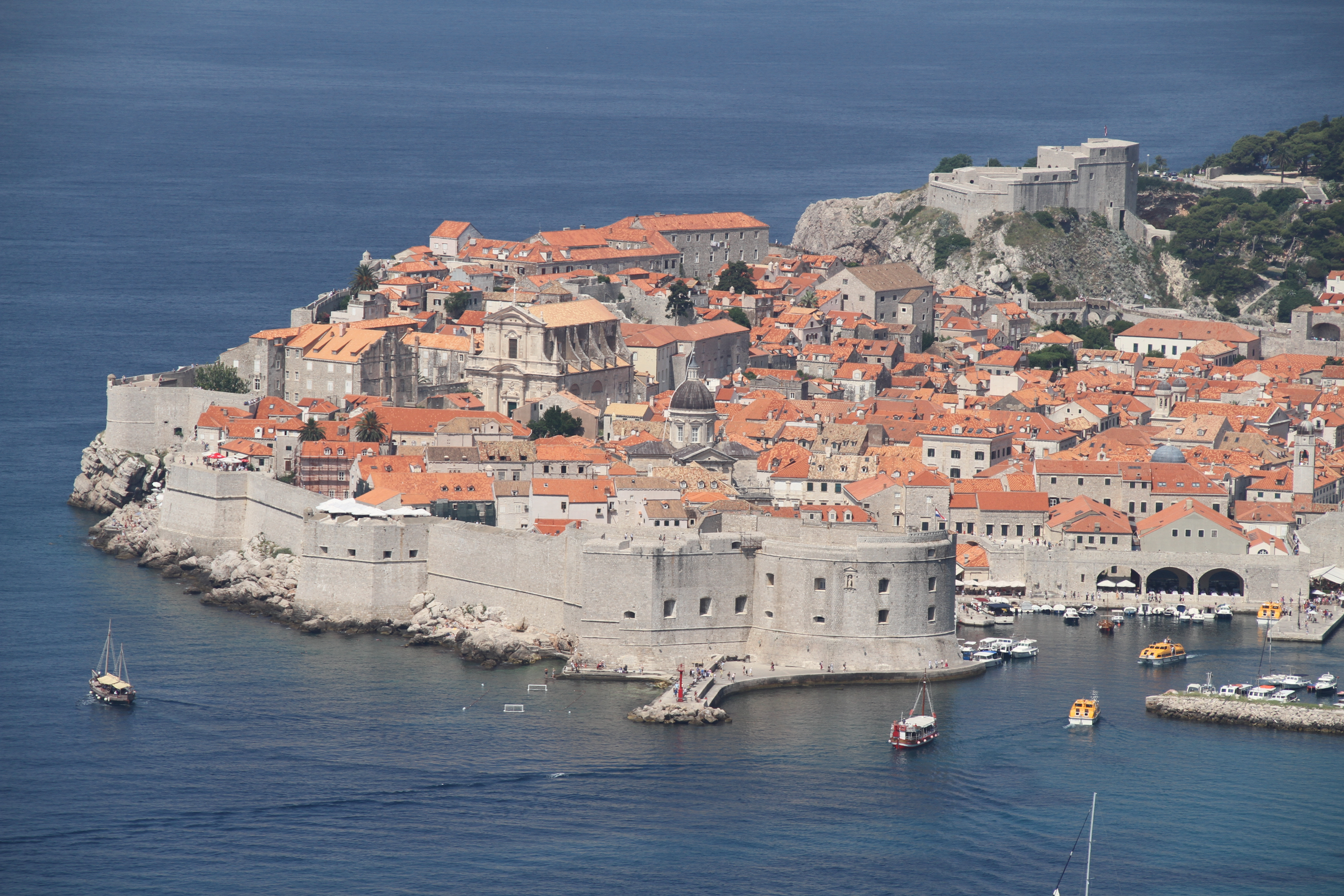
View of the Old City of Dubrovnik, with Jesuit college visible on the left

The college complex occupies a prominent location on the southern side of the Old City of Dubrovnik, with the seaside Walls of Dubrovnik to its immediate south. It is connected to the central Gundulić Square by a monumental stairway known as the Jesuit stairs (Croatian: skale od jezuita, Italian: scalinata dei gesuiti). The college buildings and church are arranged around a square that was known as Jesuit Square (Croatian: Poljana na Jezuvitima) until 1930 and was then renamed Boscovich Square (Croatian: Poljana Ruđera Boškovića) in honor of the former college's most famous alumnus, Roger Joseph Boscovich.

== Jesuit college ==
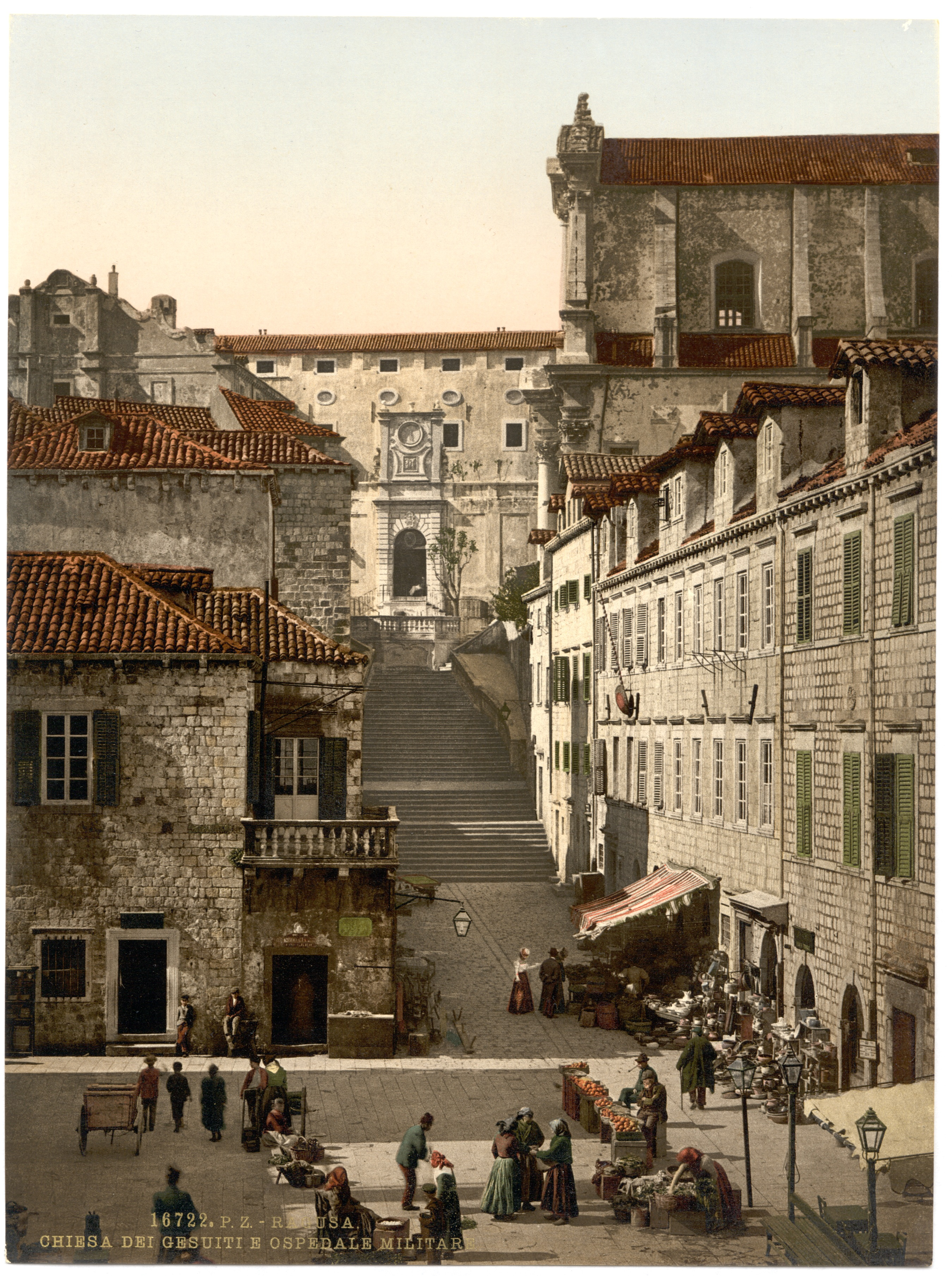
Late-19th-century photochrom of the Jesuit stairs, college (then military hospital) and church

Nicholas Bobadilla, an early companion of Ignatius of Loyola, arrived in Ragusa in 1558 and stayed there for two years. It took about a century, however, to transform this early effort into a permanent establishment. This was in part because Ragusan attitudes to the Ottoman Empire were less unfavorable than the combative anti-Ottoman stance of the Jesuit order, a gap that was gradually reduced in the course the 17th century. More prosaic issues of land ownership also played a role in the delays. The college was eventually established in 1658 thanks to a prior gift of local philosopher and theologian Marin Gundulić of the prominent Gundulić family, who had died in 1647.

The devastating 1667 Dubrovnik earthquake ruined the fledgling college and killed many of its students. The current complex was then built on plans by Jesuit architect and artist Andrea Pozzo (1642–1709), then renowned for his prior work at the Roman church of Saint Ignatius. The church's construction was started in 1699 and completed in 1725. A sculpted plaque dated 1481 showing angels holding a medieval YHS christogram above a Latin inscription, was placed prominently at the base of the staircase leading to the College's entrance. It almost certainly comes from a religious building destroyed in the 1667 earthquake and viewed as a precursor of Jesuit iconography, possibly the church of Saint Lucia that used to stand on the location of the Jesuit steps.

In the 1730s, Roman architect of Sicilian descent Pietro Passalacqua (1690–1748), also architect of the facades of Santa Croce in Gerusalemme and Santa Maria Annunziata in Borgo in Rome, led a renovation of the college and built the so-called Jesuit stairs that connect it to the nearby Gundulić Square, with explicit echoes of the Roman Spanish Steps that had been created a decade earlier by Francesco de Sanctis. At the same time, painter Gaetano Garcia decorated the church's apse with frescoes celebrating Saint Ignatius.

== Aftermath ==
After the Suppression of the Society of Jesus in 1773, the college became an educational institution under the local clergy, under the name Collegium Rhagusinum. That name in 1778 replaced the previous inscription Collegium Societatis Iesu at the top of the Jesuit stairs, with the date inscribed there (MDCCLXXV, for 1775 - now partly damaged) left unchanged. The school was later run by Piarists until 1868, was later a military hospital, then a Catholic seminary, until the creation in 1941 of the current secondary institution, the Diocesan Classical Gymnasium "Ruđer Bošković". The gymnasium has been referred to as "the best high school in Dubrovnik." The building now also houses the Diocesan seminary of Dubrovnik (Croatian: Biskupsko Sjemenište).

The University of Dubrovnik also traces its origins partly to the college. Its first logo, adopted in 2003, included a picture of the Jesuit stairs.

== In popular culture ==
The college's buildings and church have regularly served as background stages for theatrical performances during the Dubrovnik Summer Festival.

The Jesuit steps have been used as stage for the "walk of atonement" performed by Cersei Lannister in the final episode ("Mother's Mercy") of the fifth season of Game of Thrones.

== Alumni ==
- Roger Joseph Boscovich

== Gallery ==
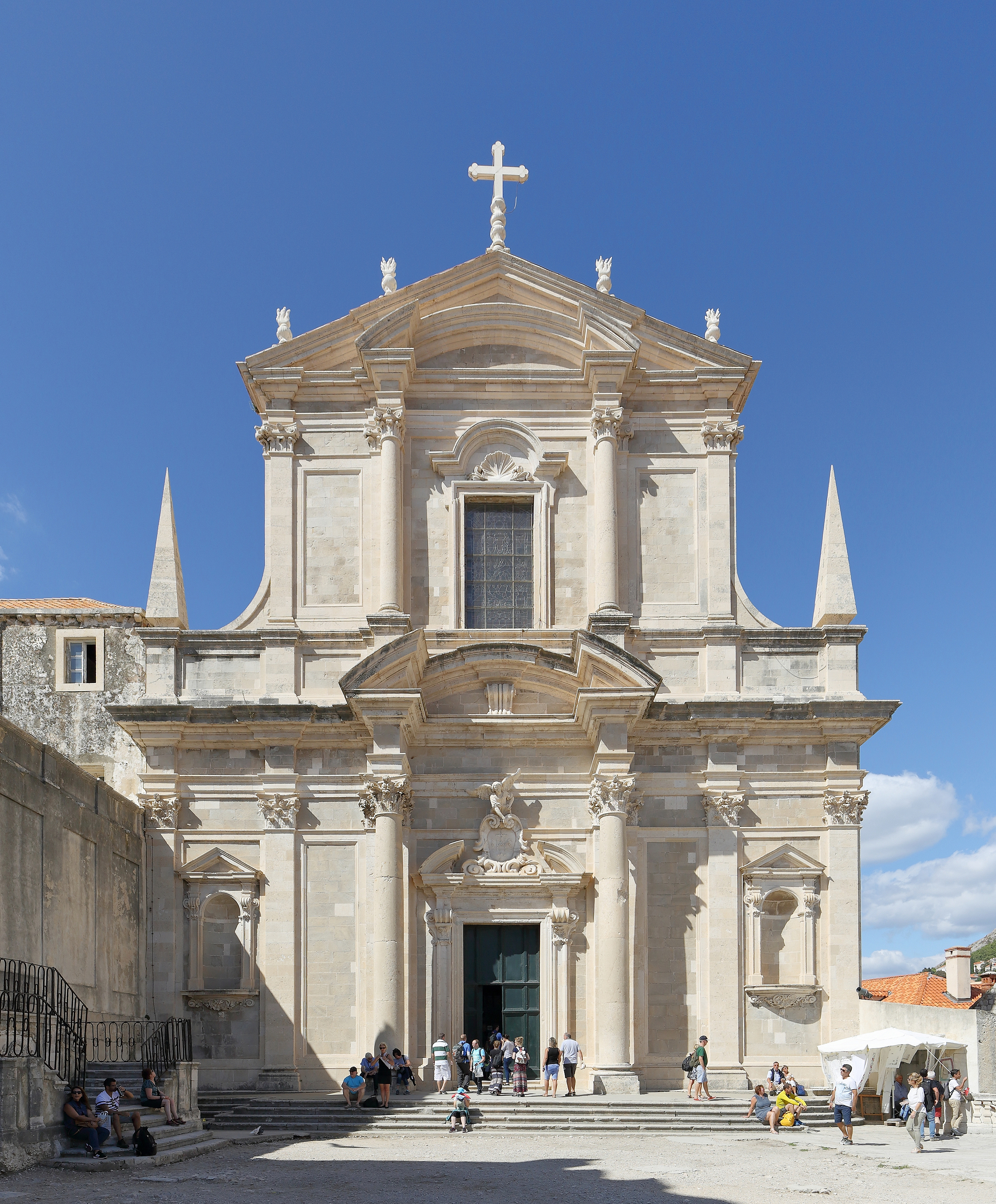
Facade of the College church, now Saint Ignatius

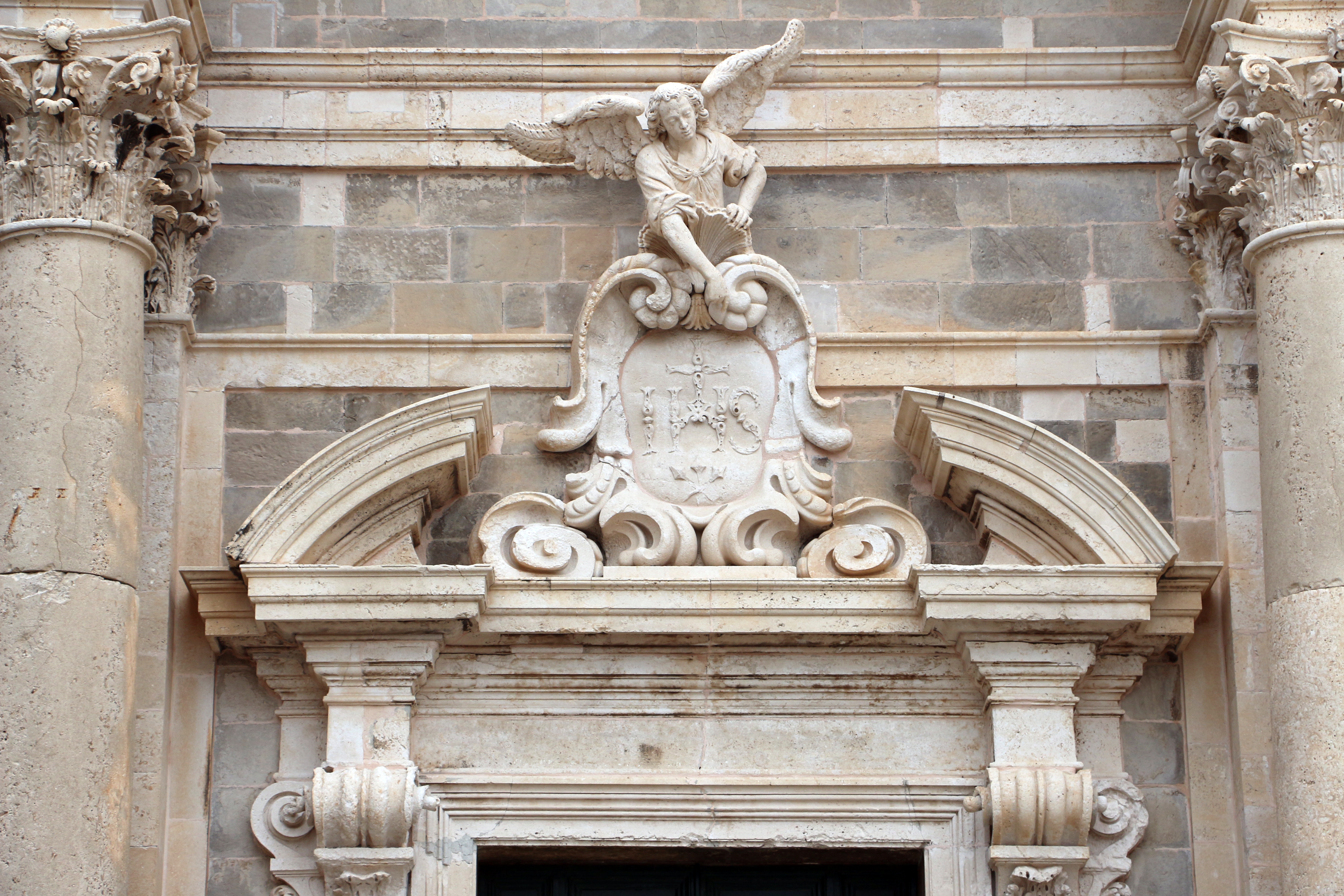
Sculpture by Marino Gropelli above the church's main entrance

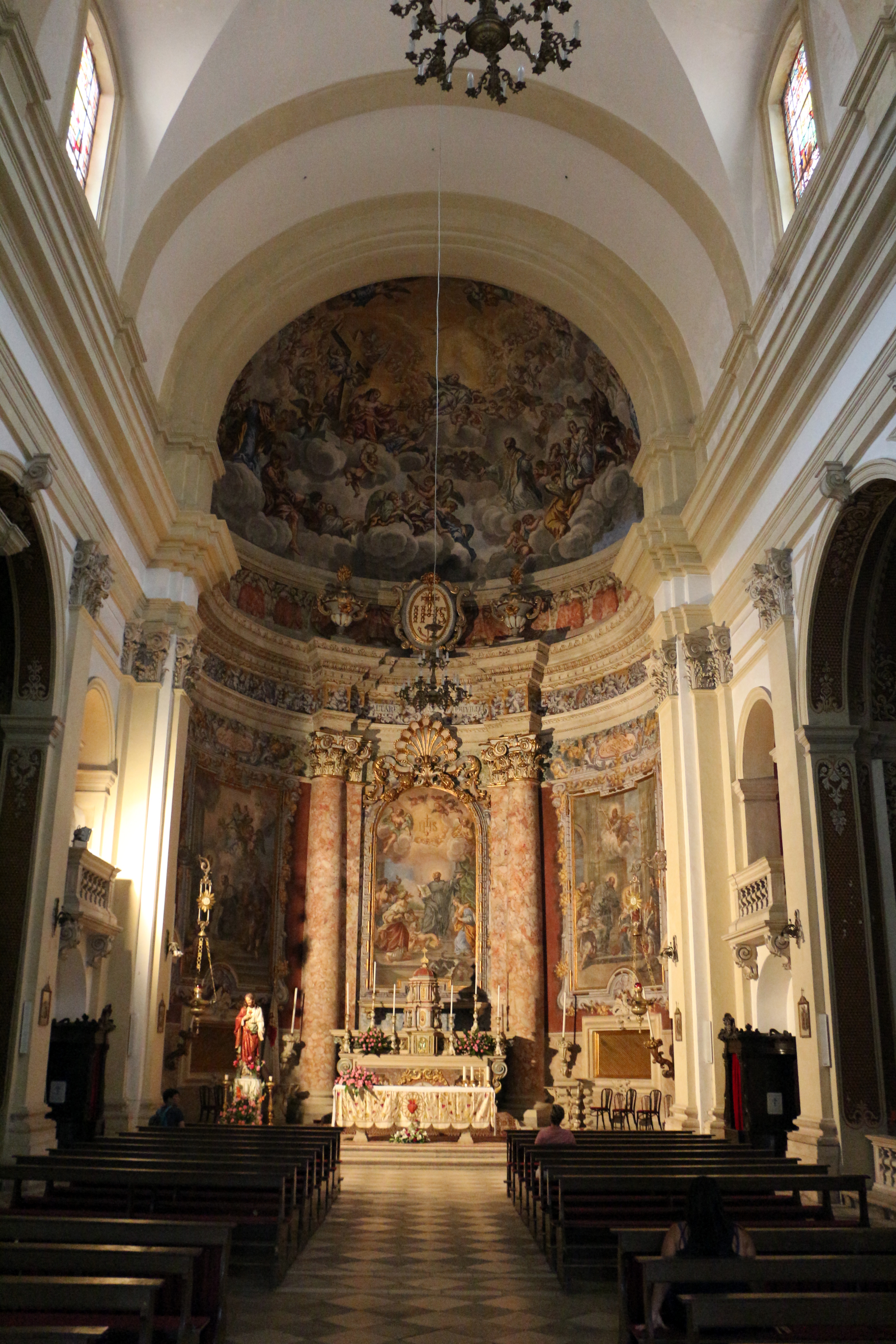
Apse with Gaetano Garcia's frescoes

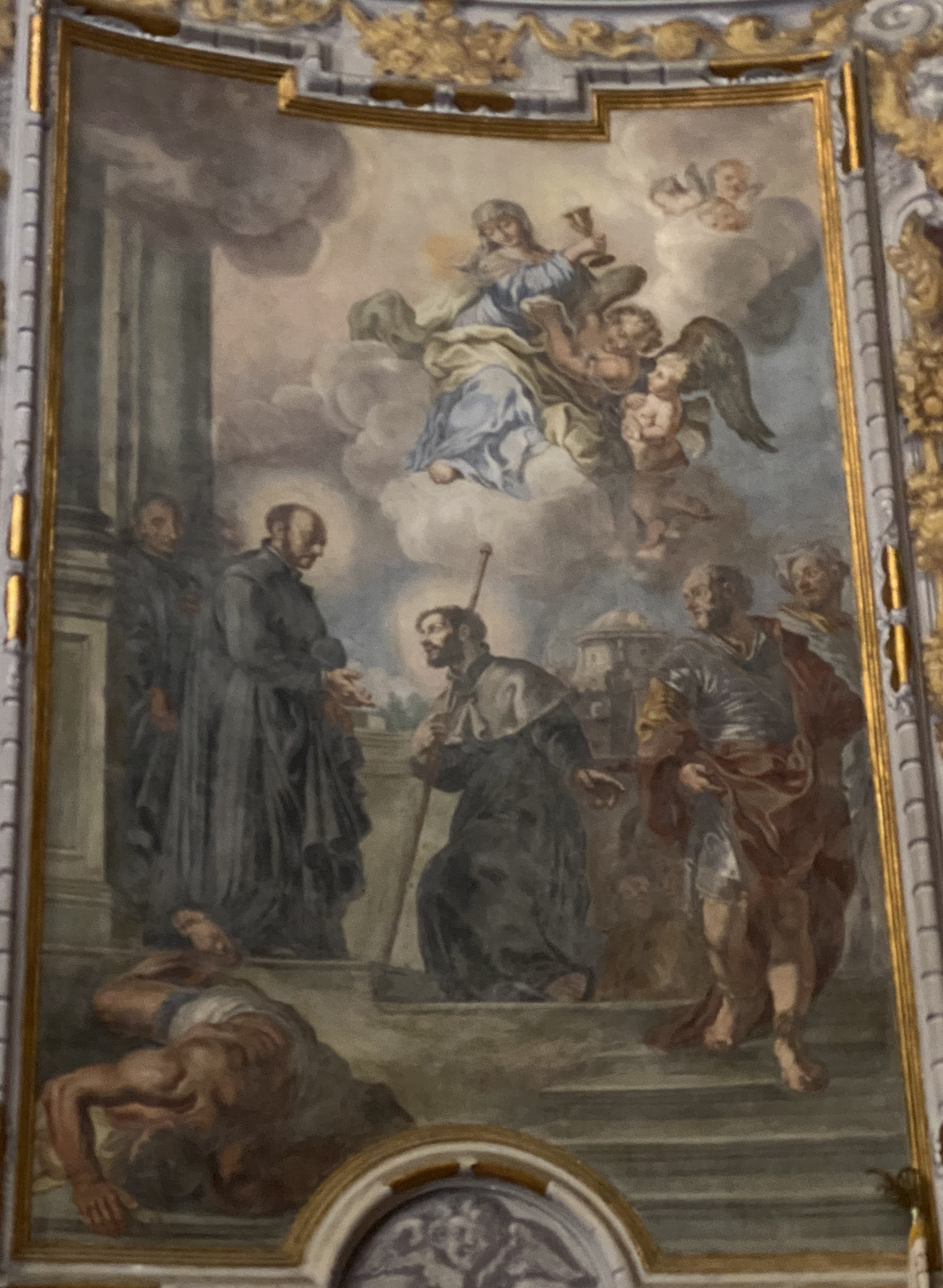
Apse fresco: Ignatius sends Francis Xavier into the missions

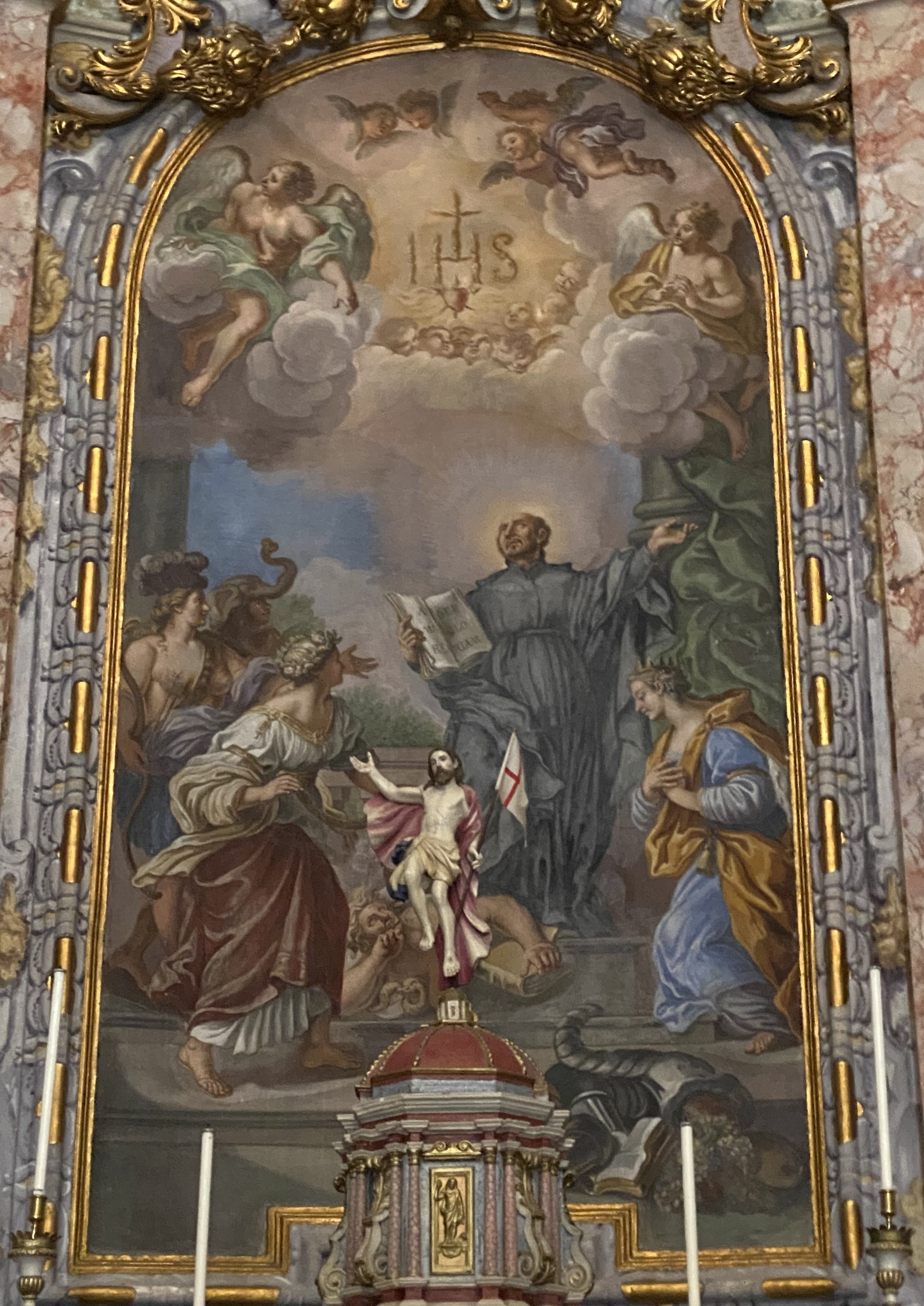
Apse fresco: Apotheosis of Ignatius surrounded by the Four Continents

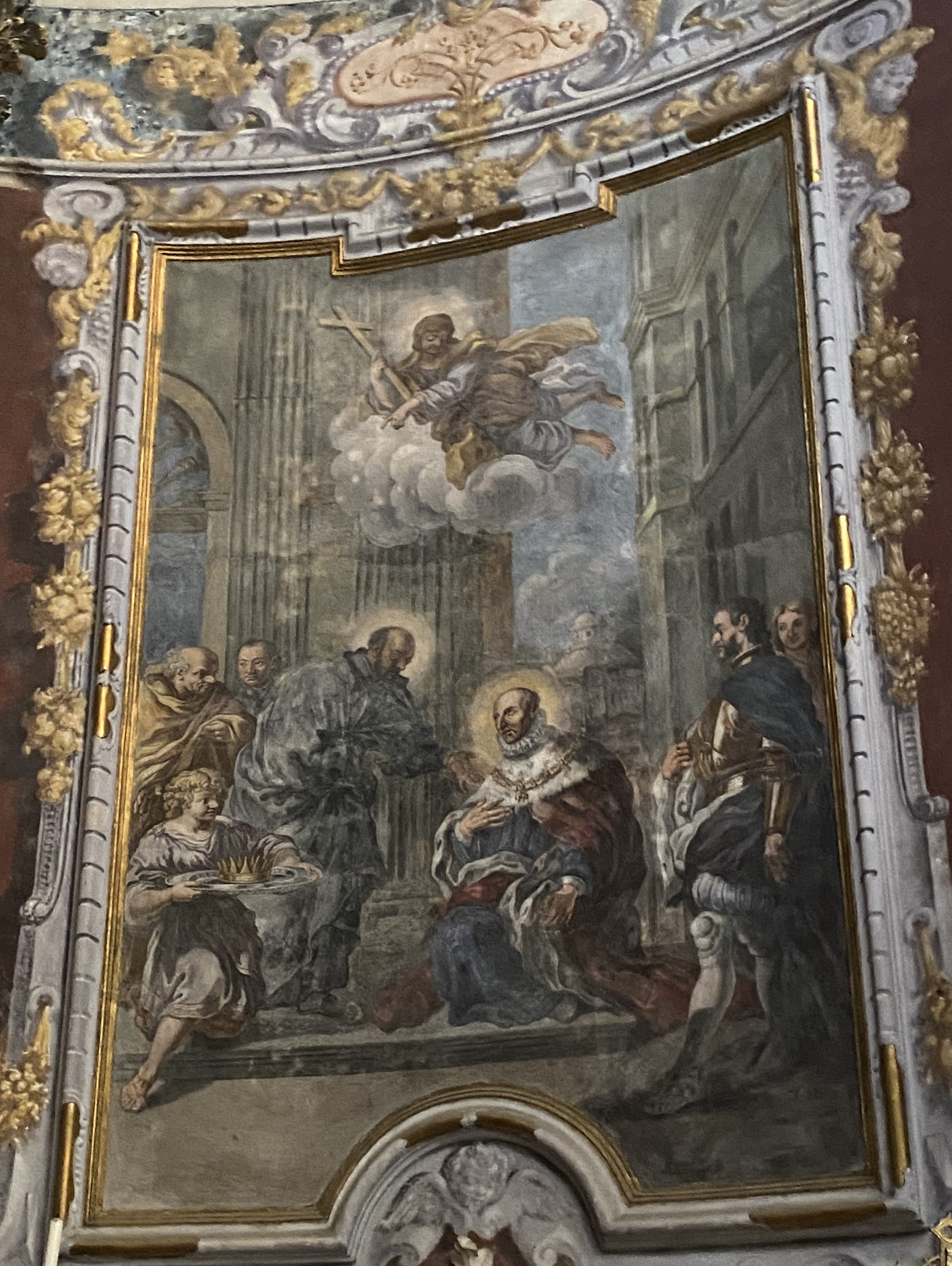
Apse fresco: Encounter of Ignatius with Francis Borja

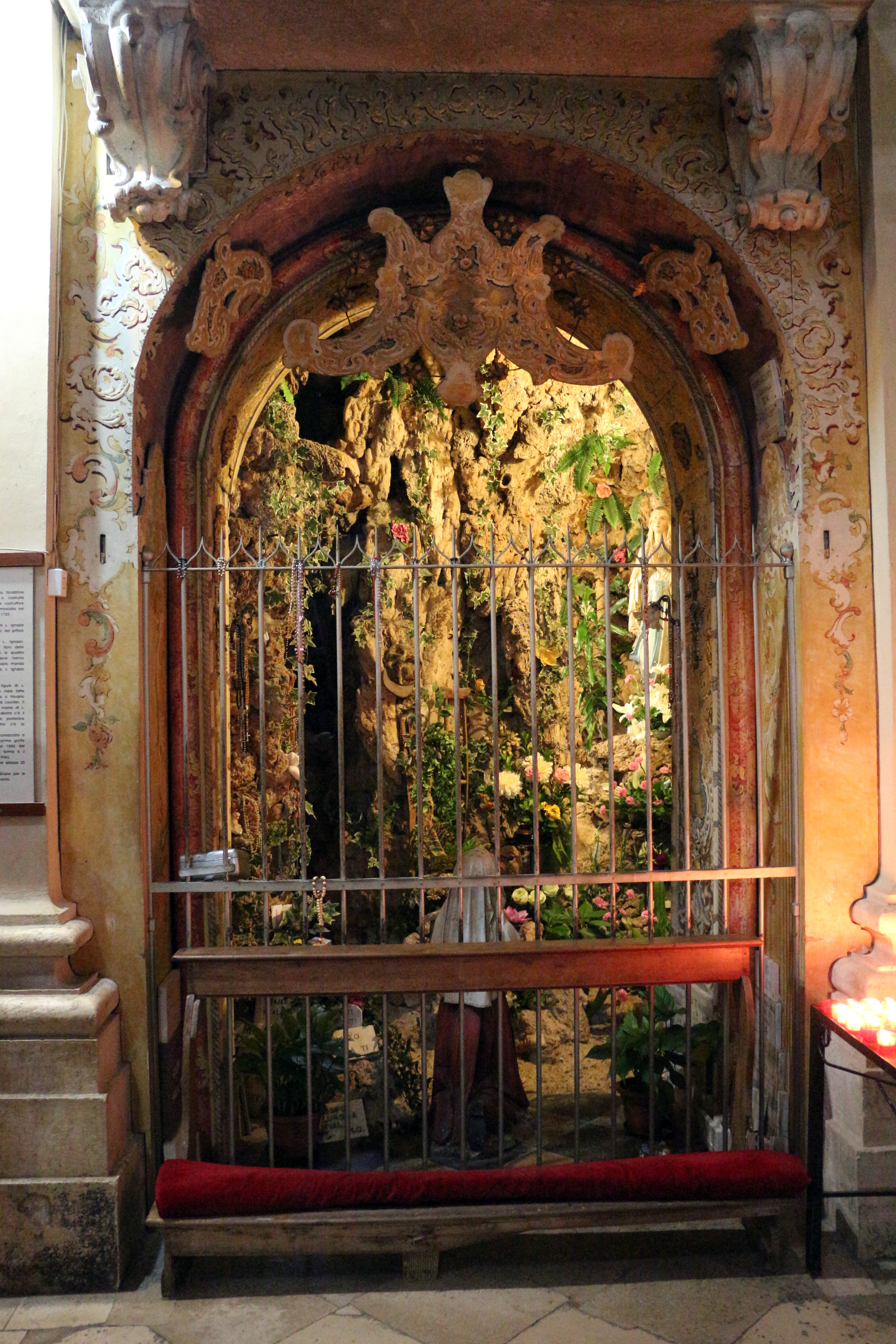
Lourdes grotto added in 1885

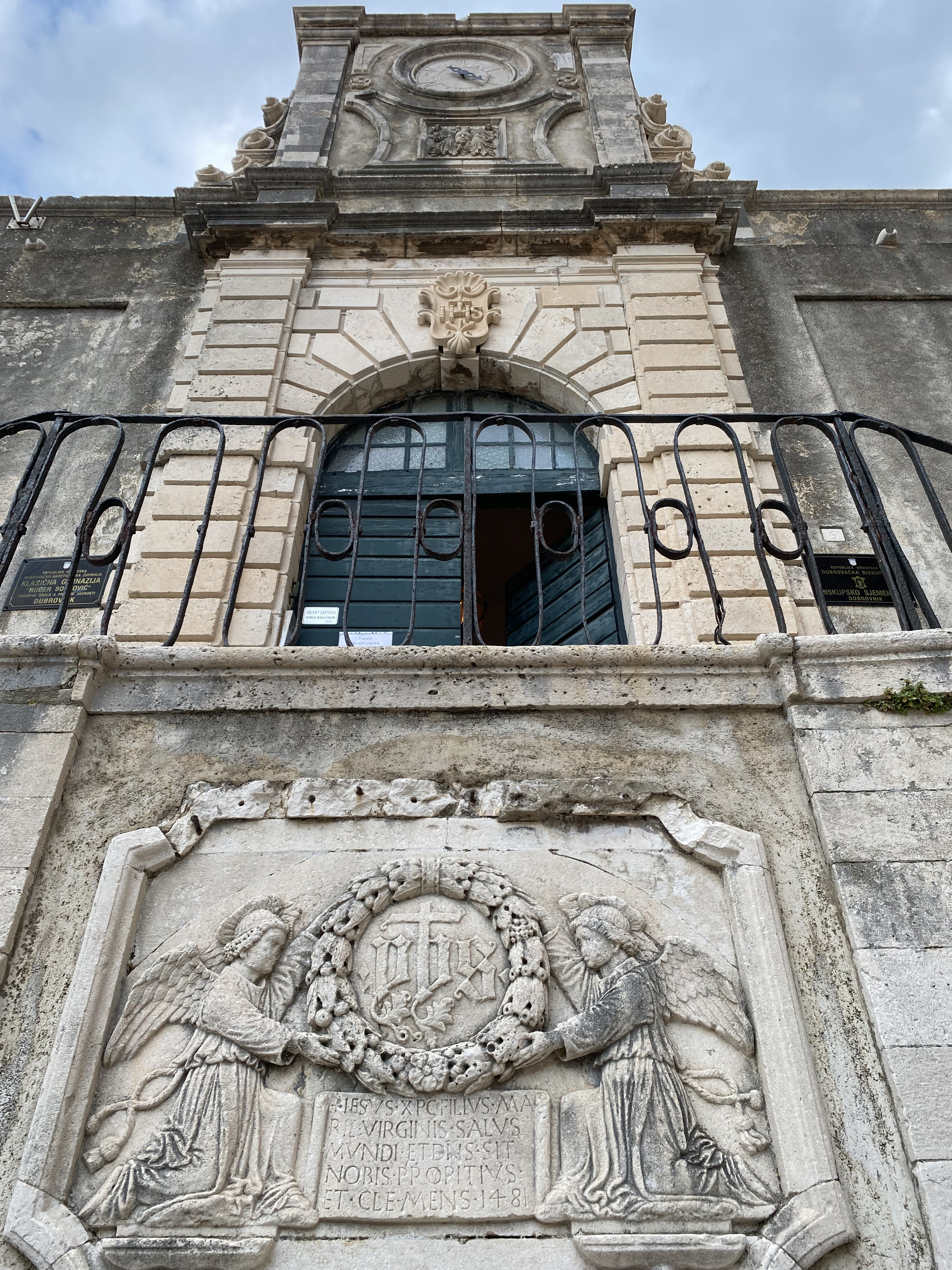
Entrance portal to the college, with reused 15th-century relief in foreground

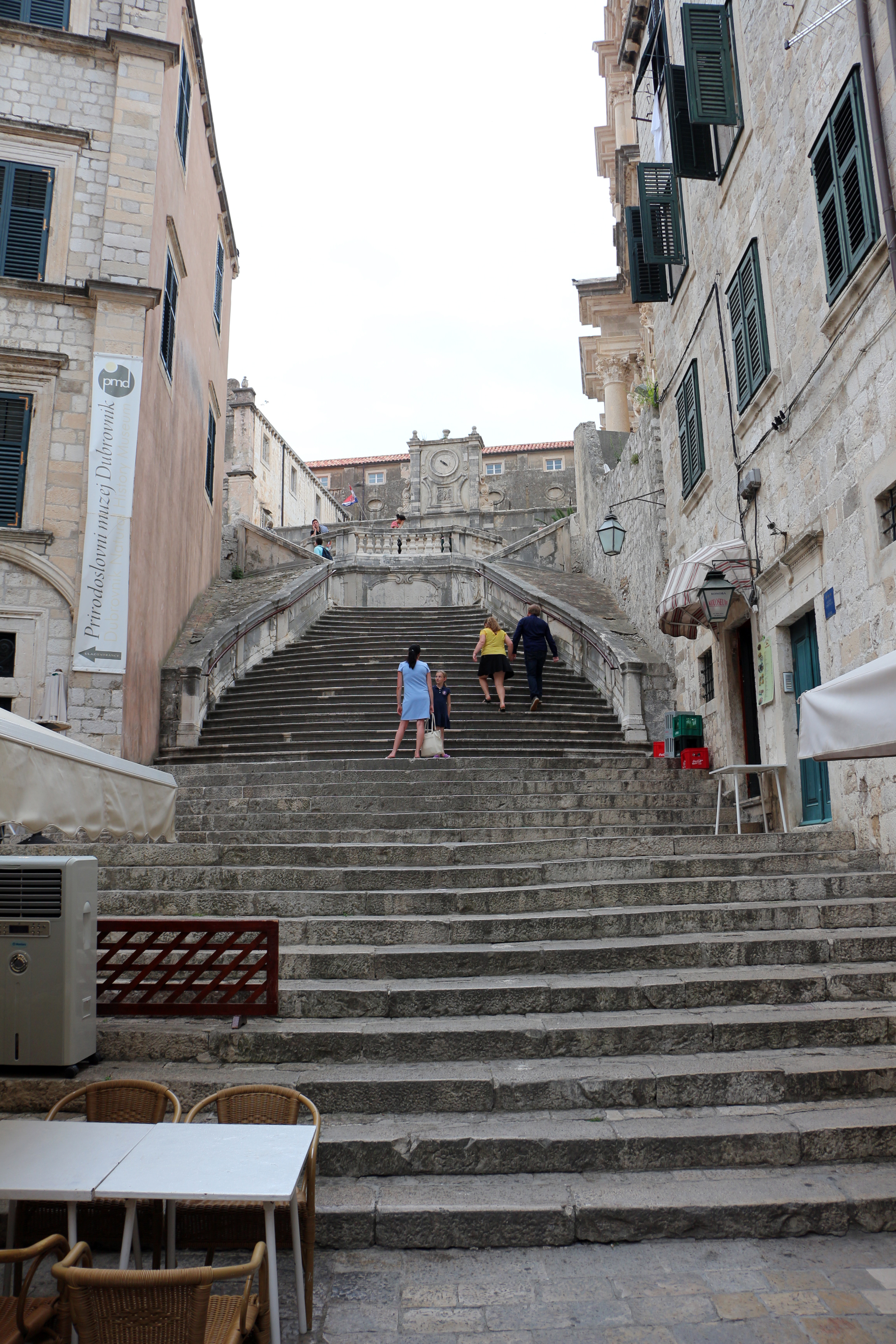
"Jesuit stairs" leading up to the college, completed in 1738

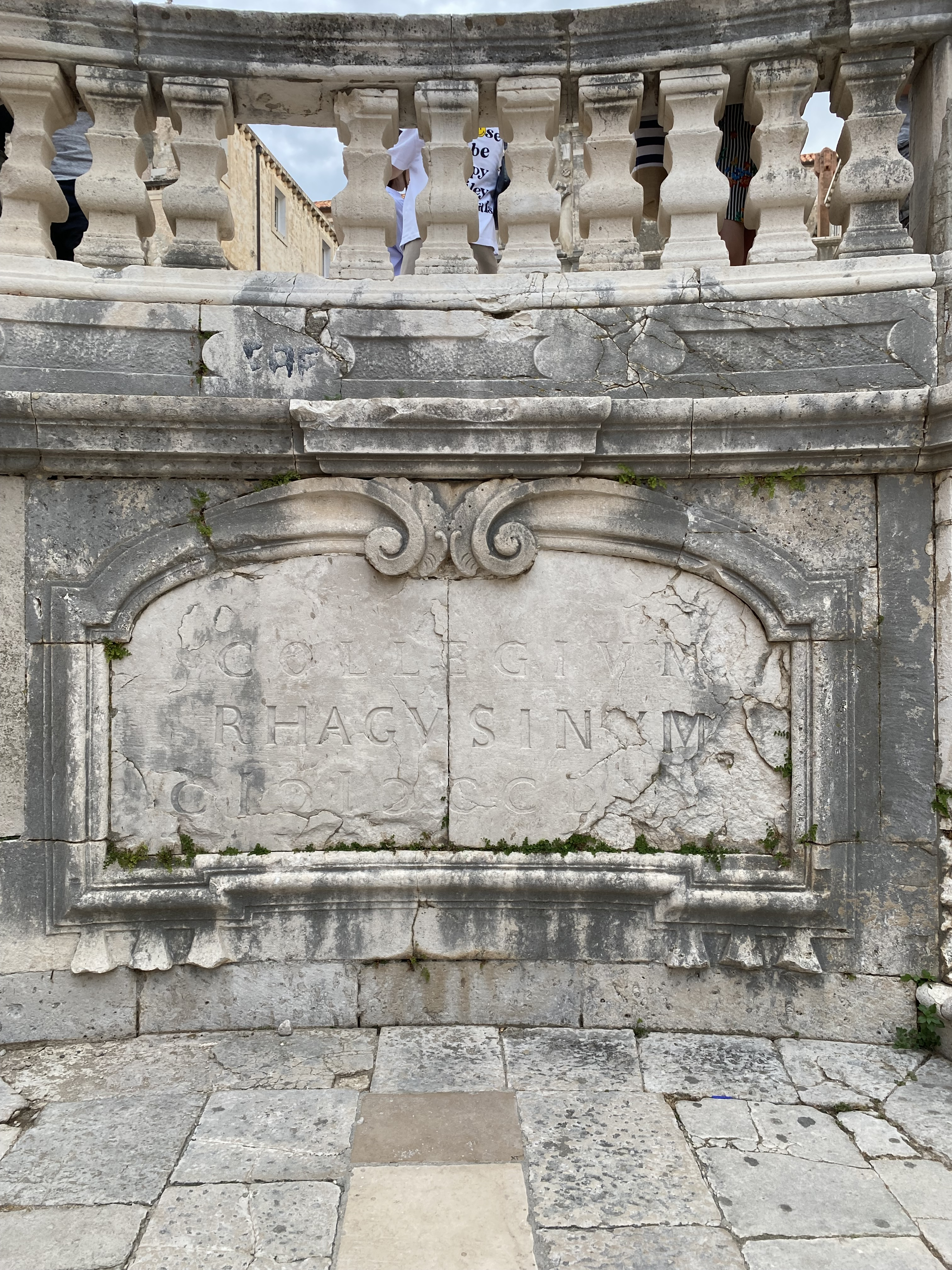
Inscription "COLLEGIUM RHAGUSINUM MDCCLXXV" at the top of the Jesuit steps

== See also ==
- Rijeka Cathedral
- Jesuit Classical Gymnasium in Osijek
- List of Jesuit sites
