= University of Dubrovnik =

Public university in Dubrovnik, Croatia

- Croatian: Sveučilište u Dubrovniku
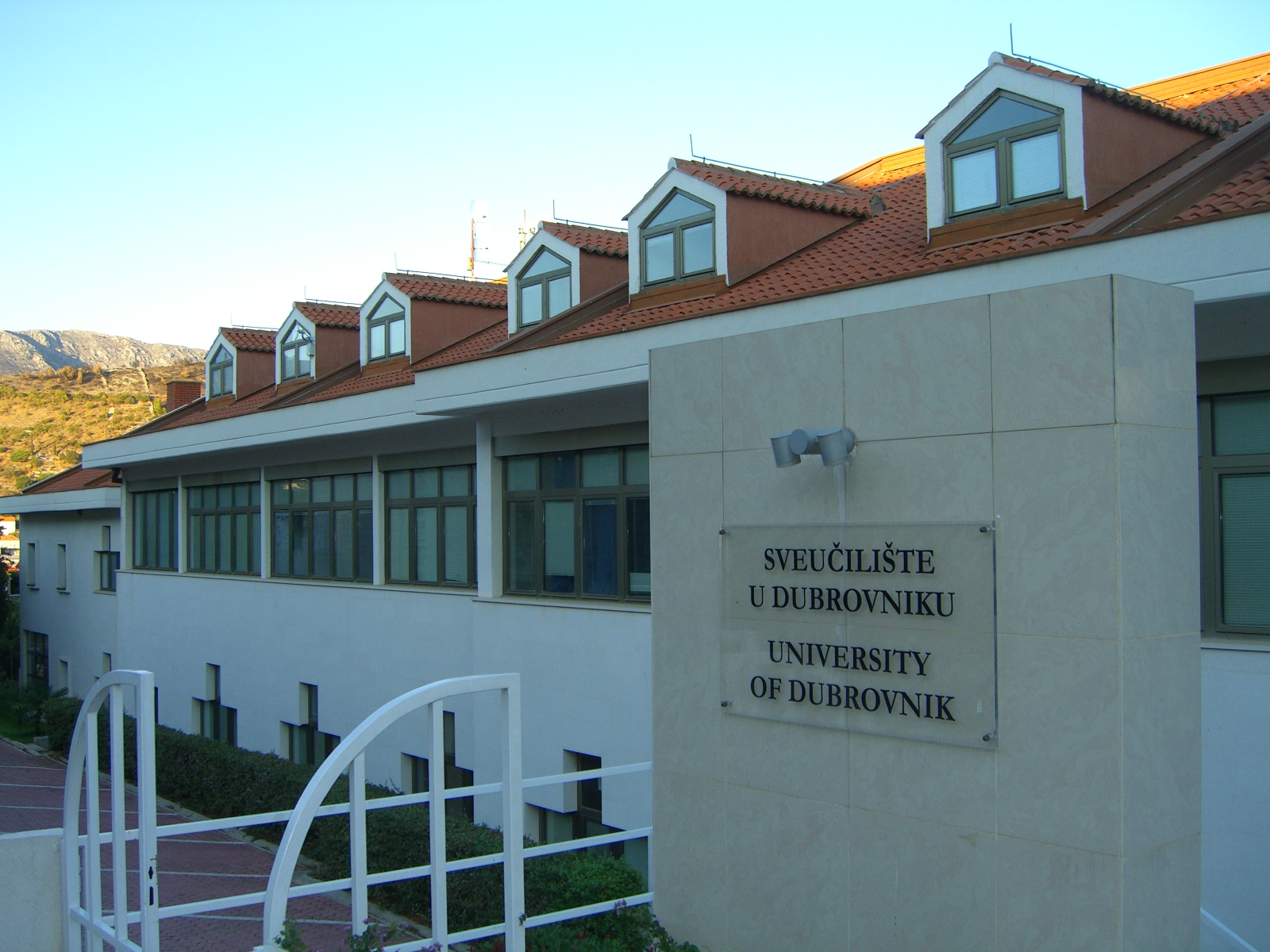
- Type: Public
- Established: 16 November 2003; 22 years ago – University; 12 December 1996; 29 years ago – Polytechnic
- Rector: Nikša Burum
- Academic staff: 151
- Administrative staff: 116
- Students: 1,975 (2010/11)
- Location: Dubrovnik, Croatia; 42°38′33″N 18°06′10″E
- Campus: Urban
- Website: www.unidu.hr
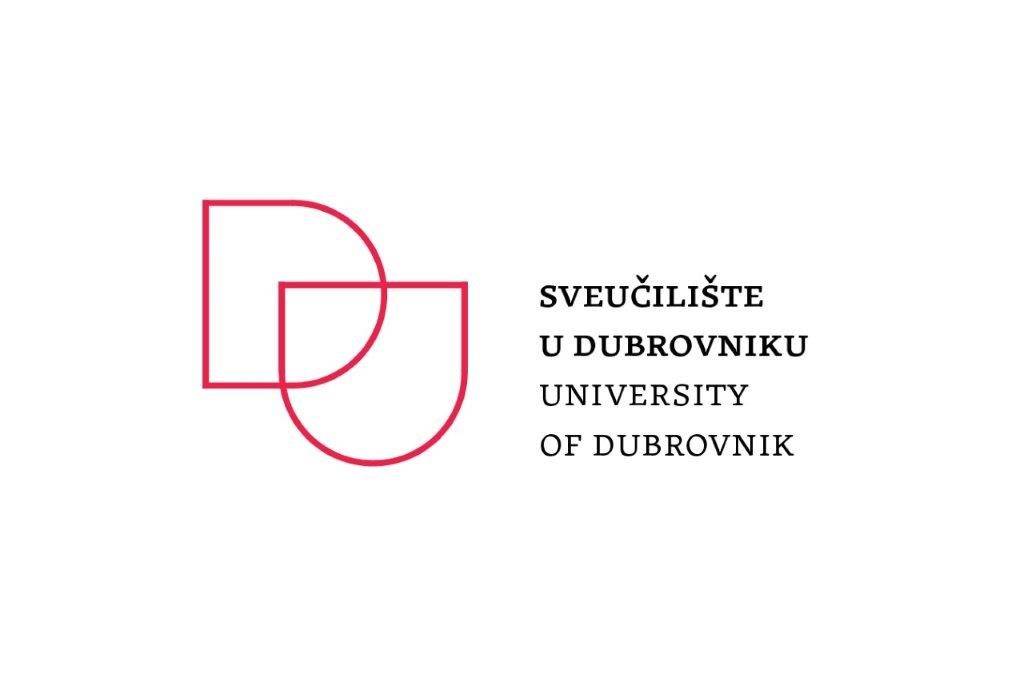

- Location in Croatia

University rankings

Regional – Overall
- QS Emerging Europe and Central Asia: 401-450 (2022)

The University of Dubrovnik (Croatian: Sveučilište u Dubrovniku, Latin: Universitas Studiorum Ragusina) is a public university located in Dubrovnik, Croatia. It has its roots in various successive institutions dedicated to the teaching of maritime engineering and naval architecture. In 1996, in recognition of the city's maritime traditions, the Polytechnic was established and was later given full university status in 2003. The university has since diversified its courses but the maritime sciences remains its traditional strength.

== History ==
High education and scientific work have their roots in the distant past. This is particularly true of the maritime, the social and the natural sciences. For example, Beno Kotruljević, of Dubrovnik, wrote four books in 1458 About Commerce and a Perfect merchant, published in Venice in 1573, which was the first work of its kind. There is also Nikola Sorgojević, a citizen of the Dubrovnik Republic (Respublica Ragusii, 1358–1816), the first Serb who wrote a book about navigation (published in 1574). Jesuits founded the Collegium Ragusinum in 1658, which was promulgated into a public institution of high learning where art and natural sciences were studied. That institution provided education for Ruđer Bošković, the most eminent Croatian scientist of the Renaissance and the founder of the dynamic theory of atoms, who continued his doctorate studies in Rome. The Dubrovnik Republic Senate allowed young aristocrats to study navigation and commerce and apply their professional knowledge when sailing out of the Adriatic Sea.

The Collegium Ragusinum is the real predecessor of the modern higher education in Dubrovnik functioning successfully from the middle of the last century, through to the nineties of the last century. It had its basis in over forty years of high education of seafarers at the Maritime Faculty of Dubrovnik and more than thirty years of education Business economics (tourism, marketing and foreign trade).

The higher education in Dubrovnik has gone through various phases, with their ups and downs. However, there always remained a strong wish to preserve the identity of the City in this field as well.

When the Croatian Parliament (Hrvatski sabor) adopted the new Higher Education Act in 1994, introducing two separate systems in higher education: one scientific, i.e. university, and the other professional i.e. polytechnic, it was clear that the Act would not be easy to implement in practice. As always, novelties were met with opposition.

However, the new challenge was accepted at the Maritime Faculty of Dubrovnik at the time and the new activities were initiated leading to the foundation of the Polytechnic. The advantages of a professional study were acknowledged as they obviously introduced elements of the West–European education into the higher education of Croatia. Although the path was by no means smooth and fast, The Polytechnic of Dubrovnik was founded two years later, by the Government Act of 12 December 1996. It was established on the basis of the education of sailors in Dubrovnik, which began in 1959, when the Higher Maritime School was founded. The Higher School became The Maritime Faculty of Dubrovnik in 1984, as a part of the University of Split, functioning till the foundation of The Polytechnic of Dubrovnik.

Considering the basic preconditions for a possible foundation of the university as ripe, the Chancellor's Office of the Polytechnic applied itself to activities aimed at the creation of a vision for development of higher education and science in Dubrovnik.

Based on the forthcoming proposals and in co-operation with the Faculty of Tourism and Foreign Trade, a feasibility study for the foundation of the University of Dubrovnik was made.

The study was met with full approval by the local community and all relevant institutions. It obtained a positive opinion of the National Council for Higher Education. The proposal of the Ministry of Education and Technology got a unanimous support of the Government of the Republic of Croatia and the Act was passed unanimously on 1 October 2003.

The University of Dubrovnik was entered in the Register of the Commercial Court in Dubrovnik on 16 November 2003, thus acquiring its legal status.

The foundation of the University of Dubrovnik represents a crown of success in the long and continuous effort of individuals and institutions that worked on the development of higher education in Dubrovnik.

== Organization ==
The university is divided into seven departments.

- Department of Aquaculture
- Department of Electrical Engineering and Information Technology
- Department of Economics and Business economics
- Engineering Department
- Maritime Department
- Department of Mass Communication
- Department of Arts and Restoration

== Profile and mission ==
The University of Dubrovnik is the newest university in Croatia. It was established in 2003, on the foundations of a very long tradition which goes back to the 17th century, but also on decades of modern higher education. By its programs, its organisation and its technical equipment, the University of Dubrovnik can be stands among very modern educational institutions.

The main characteristics of the University of Dubrovnik are:

- Organisation system which does not copy the existing universities in the Republic of Croatia and the financing which grants complete integration of the university;
- Departments for studies and professional courses, with organisation and implementation of scientific and highly professional work in a given field;
- Realisation of educational plans and programs that are completely compatible with the Bologna Declaration;
- Guarantee of transfer of ECTS credits and of mobility of students and lecturers;
- Stimulation of active involvement of students in the education process, governing bodies and research projects, and extra–curricula activities;
- Continuous monitoring of the quality of educational activities based on mutual evaluation of students and lecturers;
- Stimulation of educational and scientific improvement of lecturers and their assistants;
- Implementation and improvement of quality control of work and business (HRN EN ISO 9001 :2002);
- Monitoring needs of the economy and of the social community in the preparation of new educational plans and programs which are based on the cultural tradition of Dubrovnik, while, at the same time, introducing new modern programs which should create new traditions;
- Openness towards the international cooperation with the aim of attracting international programs and foreign students.

In the academic year 2004/2005 the University of Dubrovnik had twelve university and six professional courses in the following fields: science of navigation, marine engineering, marine electrical engineering and communication technologies, business and applied information technology, aquaculture and mariculture, economy and business studies, tourism and mass communication.

The institution also offers practical advice for students who seek accommodation. including hotels, dormitory and private accommodation.

In the academic year 2010/11 there were 1,975 students enrolled at the university. The number of people engaged in lecturing, professional and scientific activities at the university adds to 151.

== See also ==
- Education in Croatia
- Dubrovnik
