= Vinko Pulišić =

20th-century Catholic bishop

The Most Reverend Vinko Pulišić
- Archbishop of Zadar
- Archdiocese: Zadar
- See: Zadar
- Appointed: 16 June 1910
- Term ended: 2 April 1922
- Predecessor: Matej Dvornik
- Successor: Petar Dujam Munzani
- Other posts: Bishop of Šibenik(1903-1910); Titular Archbishop of Caesarea in Cappadocia (1922-1936)

Orders
- Ordination: 5 December 1875
- Consecration: 31 January 1904 by Pietro Respighi

Personal details
- Born: Vinko Pulišić; 22 January 1853 Olib, Austria-Hungary (now Croatia)
- Died: 6 February 1936 (aged 83)
- Denomination: Catholic

Styles of Vinko Pulišić
- Reference style: The Most Reverend
- Spoken style: Your Excellency
- Religious style: Archbishop

Vinko Pulišić (22 January 1853 - 6 February 1936) was the Catholic Archbishop of Zadar.

He joined the Old Church Slavonic Academy in 1914.

His literary estate remained at his palace in Olib, inherited by his nephew don Ivan Pulišić, and upon the latter's death in 1962 by his sister Marija "Marušica", who allowed Manfred Paštrović to transport them to his house on Silba in 1973. Paštrović later gave them to the parish office on Silba, from whence Ivica Vigato transported them in boxes to the office of the Stalna izložba crkvene umjetnosti in Zadar in 2005 at the request of Pavao Kero. There, Kero and Pavao Galić labelled the boxes and transferred them to the Arhiv Zadarske nadbiskupije, where they remain today.

== Works ==
- Olib: ukratko i prosto sastavio jedan stari domorodac [Olib: Briefly and Humbly Drawn Up by an Old Patriot] (in Serbo-Croatian). Preko: Tisak Katoličke hrvatske tiskarne. 1929.

== Bibliography ==
- Žic, Nikola (1913a). "Članovi" [Glagolitic Collections]. Vjesnik Staroslavenske akademije u Krku (in Croatian). 1 (published 1914): 3–10.
- Žic, Nikola (1912a). "Članovi". Vjesnik Staroslavenske akademije u Krku (in Croatian). 1 (published 1913): 10–16.
- Bralić, Ante (2009). "Vinko Pulišić, nadbiskup zadarski i metropolita Dalmacije (1853.-1963.)" [Island of Rich Heritage]. Olib: otok, selo i ljudi (in Serbo-Croatian). Zagreb, Olib: Družba Braća Hrvatskoga Zmaja, Mjesni odbor Olib. pp. 245–252. ISBN 978-953-6928-22-4.
- Perović, Anamaria (2020). "Nekoliko osobitosti sređivanja korespondencije na primjeru osobnog arhivskog fonda Vinka Pulišića, zadarskoga nadbiskupa i metropolita Dalmacije" [Some peculiarities of arranging correspondence on the example of the personal papers of Vinko Pulišić, the Archbishop of Zadar and Metropolitan of Dalmatia]. Arhivski vjesnik (in Serbo-Croatian). 63: 117–139. doi:10.36506/av.63.5. eISSN 1848-3143.

Catholic Church titles
Preceded by Matteo Zannoni	Bishop of Šibenik; 1903-1910	Succeeded by Luca Pappafava
Preceded by Matej Dvornik	Archbishop of Zadar; 1910-1922	Succeeded by Petar Dujam Munzani
