= Ivan Prenđa =

- Archbishop of Zadar
- Church: Catholic Church
- Archdiocese: Archdiocese of Zadar
- In office: 2 February 1996 – 25 January 2010
- Predecessor: Marijan Oblak
- Successor: Želimir Puljić
- Previous post: Coadjutor Archbishop of Zadar (1990-1996)

Orders
- Ordination: 29 June 1964
- Consecration: 9 June 1990 by Franjo Kuharić

Personal details
- Born: 31 December 1939 Zemunik Gornji, Banovina of Croatia, Kingdom of Yugoslavia
- Died: 25 January 2010 (aged 70)

Ivan Prenđa (31 December 1939 in Zemunik Gornji – 25 January 2010 in Zagreb) was the Roman Catholic archbishop of the Archdiocese of Zadar, Croatia.

Ordained to the priesthood on 29 June 1964, for the Zadar Archdiocese, Prenđa was appointed Coadjutor Archbishop of the archdiocese on 29 March 1990 and was ordained into that office on 9 June 1990. Archbishop Prenđa became the archbishop of Zadar on 6 February 1996.

== Notes ==
Preceded by Marijan Oblak	Archbishop of Zadar; 1996–2010	Succeeded by Želimir Puljić
