= Mate Garković =

Croatian Roman Catholic archbishop

The Most Reverend Mate Garković
- Archbishop of Zadar
- Archdiocese: Zadar
- See: Zadar
- Appointed: 24 December 1960
- Term ended: 26 May 1968
- Predecessor: Pietro Doimo Munzani
- Successor: Marijan Oblak
- Other posts: Apostolic Administrator of Zadar (1952-1960); Titular Bishop of Adrasus (1952-1960)

Orders
- Ordination: 28 July 1907
- Consecration: 30 March 1952 by Miho Pušić

Personal details
- Born: Mate Garković; 12 September 1882 Veli Rat, Austria-Hungary (now Croatia)
- Died: 26 May 1968 (aged 85) Zadar, Socialist Republic of Croatia (now Croatia)
- Buried: Cathedral of St. Anastasia, Zadar
- Denomination: Roman Catholic
- Motto: U križu je spas (In the Cross is salvation)

Styles of Mate Garković
- Reference style: The Most Reverend
- Spoken style: Your Excellency
- Religious style: Archbishop

Mate Garković (12 September 1882 - 26 May 1968) was the Roman Catholic archbishop of the Archdiocese of Zadar, Croatia.

== Life ==
Garković was born on 12 September 1882 in Veli Rat on the island of Dugi Otok in Dalmatia, then Austria-Hungary. Ordained as a Roman Catholic priest on 28 July 1907, he was firstly pedagogue in the Zmajević minor seminary in Zadar where he stayed until 1914. In 1914, he was appointed parish priest of Preko and dean of the Ugljan Deanery. When the Italians occupied Dalmatia, Garković was arrested and imprisoned for six months in Sestrunj. Then returned to Preko where he remained until 1925. Next 20 years, he has worked as a professor of pastoral theology and Hebrew in Split.

Garković was appointed Apostolic Administrator of Zadar on 22 February 1952. He was consecrated as bishop by Miho Pušić, archbishop of Hvar on 30 March 1952. Garković was appointed the archbishop of Zadar on 24 December 1960.

Garković died on 26 May 1968, aged 85 in Zadar. He was buried in the Cathedral of St. Anastasia, Zadar.

His portrait bust was erected in his native village Veli Rat in a front of the church.

== Notes ==
Preceded by Pietro Doimo Munzani	Archbishop of Zadar; 1960-1968	Succeeded by Marijan Oblak
