= Petar Dujam Munzani =

20th-century Catholic bishop

The Most Reverend Pietro Doimo Munzani
- Archbishop of Zadar
- Archdiocese: Zadar
- See: Zadar
- Appointed: 16 March 1933
- Term ended: 11 December 1948
- Predecessor: Vinko Pulišić
- Successor: Mate Garković
- Other posts: Apostolic Administrator of Zadar (1926-1933); Titular Bishop of Sarepta (1926-1933); Titular Archbishop of Tyana (1948-1951)

Orders
- Ordination: 6 April 1913
- Consecration: 17 October 1926 by Luigi Fogar

Personal details
- Born: Pietro Doimo Munzani; 4 December 1890 Zara, Austria-Hungary (now Zadar, Croatia)
- Died: 28 January 1951 (aged 60)
- Buried: Brindisi, Italy
- Denomination: Roman Catholic

Styles of Pietro Doimo Munzani
- Reference style: The Most Reverend
- Spoken style: Your Excellency
- Religious style: Archbishop

Pietro Doimo Munzani (4 December 1890 – 28 January 1951) was the Roman Catholic Archbishop of Zadar.

== Life ==
Munzani was born on 4 December 1890 in Zara in Dalmatia, then Austria-Hungary.

Between 1918 and 1947 Zara was part of the Kingdom of Italy. After the Province of Zara was occupied by the Yugoslav partisans, Munzani was arrested by Yugoslav Communists on March 7, 1945. He was forced to resign on December 11, 1948. He died in exile on January 28, 1951.

== Notes ==
Catholic Church titles
Preceded by Vinko Pulišić	Archbishop of Zadar; 1933-1948	Succeeded by Mate Garković
