= Marijan Oblak =

Croatian archbishop

- Archbishop of Zadar
- Bust in front of the church in Veli Rat
- Church: Catholic Church
- Archdiocese: Archdiocese of Zadar
- In office: 20 August 1969 – 2 February 1996
- Predecessor: Mate Garković
- Successor: Ivan Prenđa
- Previous posts: Titular Bishop of Flavias (1958-1969); Auxiliary Bishop of Zadar (1958-1969)

Orders
- Ordination: 5 August 1945
- Consecration: 6 July 1958 by Mate Garković

Personal details
- Born: 8 December 1919 Veli Rat, Dalmatia Province, Kingdom of Serbs, Croats and Slovenes
- Died: 15 February 2008 (aged 88) Zadar, Zadar County, Croatia

Mons. Marijan Oblak (December 8, 1919 in Veli Rat, Dugi otok – February 15, 2008 in Zadar) was a Croatian archbishop of the Archdiocese of Zadar in the Catholic Church.

He was ordained a priest on August 5, 1945, in Šibenik. From 1945 to 1949, he was prefect in the diocesan children's seminary in Šibenik, as well as a teacher at a state gymnasium. From 1949 to 1951 he was prefect of the archdiocese's seminary Zmajević in Zadar. From 1955 to 1958 he served as vice-rector of the seminary.

He was named auxiliary bishop of Zadar on April 30, 1958, and was ordained a bishop of a titular see on July 6 of the same year in the Cathedral of St. Anastasia. He was made archbishop on August 29, 1969. He served in this position until February 2, 1996.

Marijan Oblak died on February 15, 2008, in Zadar.

Preceded by Mate Garković	Archbishop of Zadar; 1969-1996	Succeeded by Ivan Prenđa
