= Olib =

Croatian island

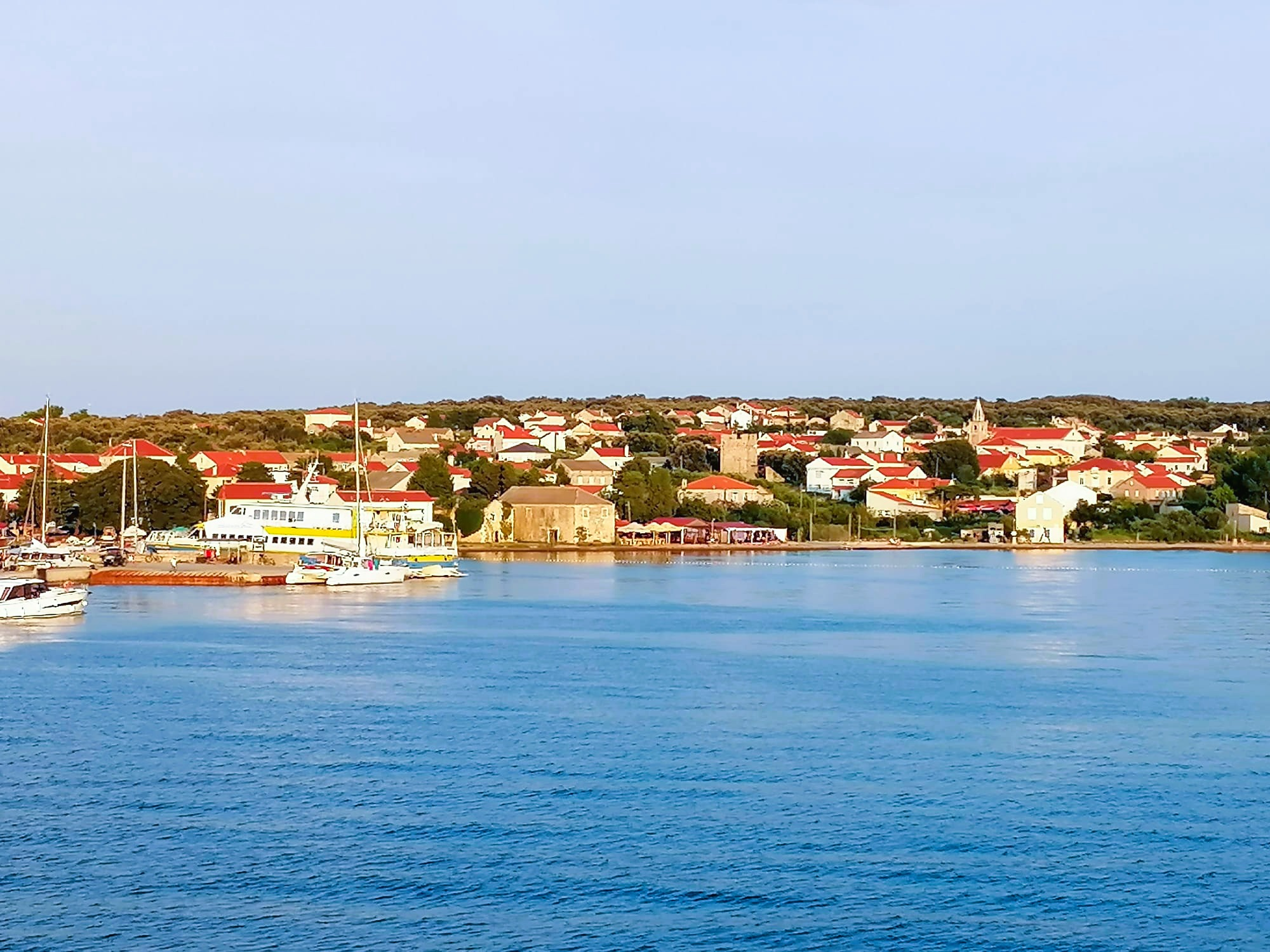
- Olib village as seen from the sea

Geography
- Location: Adriatic Sea
- Coordinates: 44°22′N 14°46′E
- Area: 26.14 km^{2} (10.09 sq mi)
- Highest elevation: 74 m (243 ft)
- Highest point: Kalac

Administration
- Croatia
- County: Zadar County

Demographics
- Demonym: Olibljanin (hr, male); Olibljanka (hr, female)
- Population: 113 (2021)
- Pop. density: 4.3/km^{2} (11.1/sq mi)

Additional information
- Time zone: CET (UTC+1)
  - Summer (DST): CEST (UTC+2)
- Postal codes: 23296 Olib
- Area code: 023

Olib (pronounced [ɔ̌lib]) is a Croatian island in northern Dalmatia, located north-west of Zadar, south-west of Pag, south-east of Lošinj and just east of Silba with an area of 26.14 km^{2}.

== History ==
Greek geographer Strabo mentions a settlement named Aloip, which was inhabited by the Liburnians. During the Roman rule, Aloip was rebuilt in a different location, in the island's south-west.

Croats colonised the island from the mid-7th to the late 8th centuries. Another wave of Croatian inhabitants arrived in the mid to late 15th century, from Vrlika in the Cetinska Krajina region in Split-Dalmatia County, fleeing the Ottoman invasions. The Chakavian dialect of Croatian is spoken on Olib. Residents call themselves Olibljani.

The island has many historic buildings and ruins. Among these are the Assumption of Mary parish church with its collection of antiquities including Glagolitic codices dating back to the 17th century (housed in the treasury of the parish rectory), the stone tower or kula built for protection from pirates, and the ruins of Saint Paul's Church and Monastery which was abandoned in the 13th century.

In addition to the parish church of the Assumption of Mary (Uznesenja Blažene Djevice Marije) built in 1899, Olib has three other churches. Saint Anastasia (Sv. Stošije) is situated inside the village cemetery, built in 1632 and restored in 1868, Saint Nicholas (Sv. Nikola) built in 1888 and is located on the cove of Porat, and Saint Rocco (Sv. Roko) built in 1881 and is close to the port of Samotvorac.

Donato Filippi (1832–1912) of Zadar owned the island until 13 May 1900, when its inhabitants purchased it from him for 50,000 forint.

== Modern-day Olib ==
The traditional products of Olib include wine, olive oil, and cheese. Most of the food is consumed locally rather than being sold in the market.

There is no water supply network on Olib so all homes on the island are built with cisterns to capture rainwater. During the summer months, the island receives an additional supply of water carried by ships if needed.

Olib is connected to the mainland by ferry to Zadar via the islands of Silba and Premuda. The journey to the mainland takes approximately two hours on a catamaran and up to three and a half hours by ferry. Cars are forbidden to be used for transport on the island, instead having to be parked in a designated area adjacent to the harbour.

== Geography ==
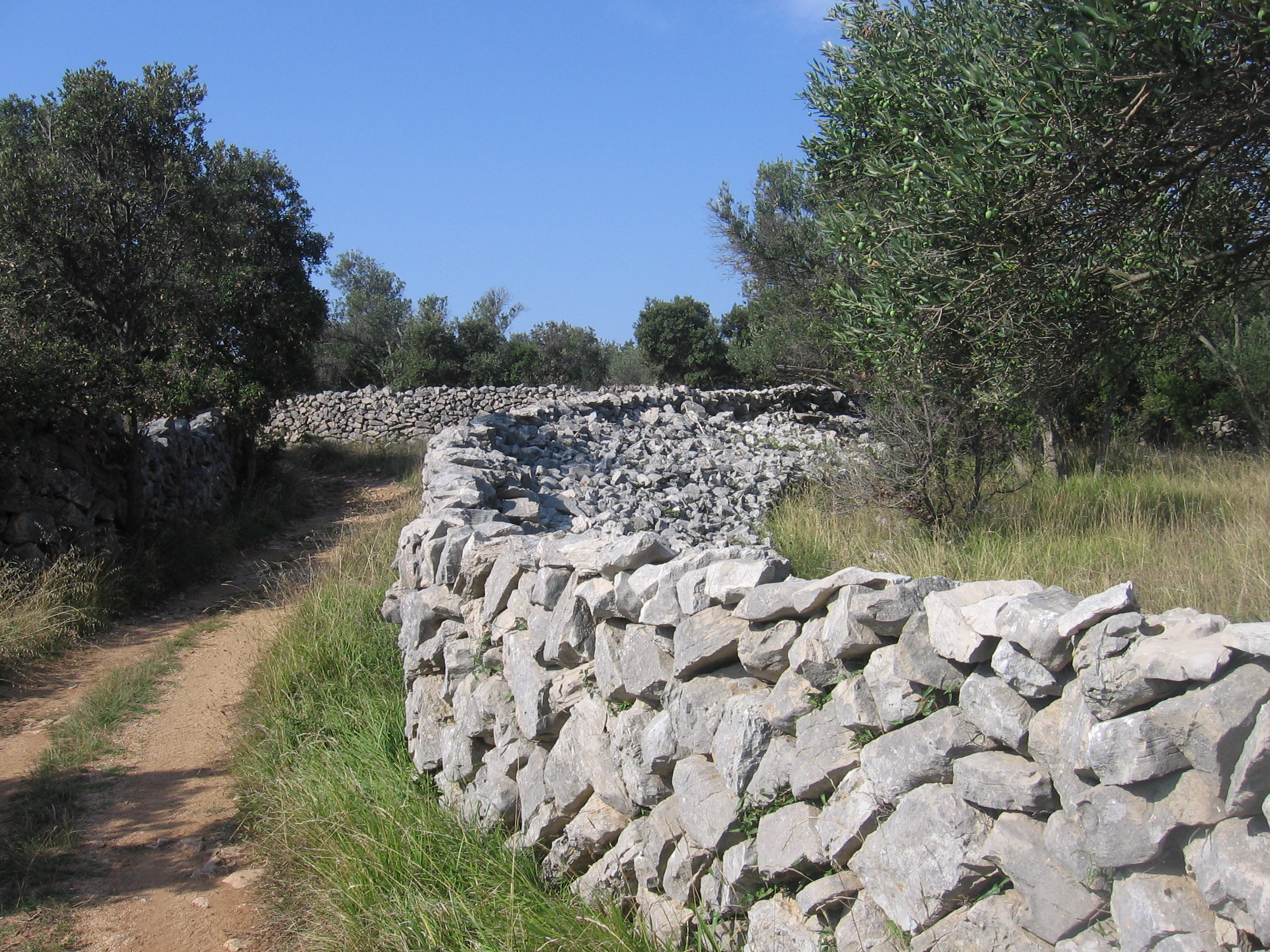
Dry stone wall on Olib

To the SW of the town lie a number of large but shallow karst dolines, referred to collectively as Ponikve.

== Demographics ==
Although the year-round population hovers around only 100, that number is much larger during the summer months, when both descendants of the island's native population as well as international tourists come to visit. According to the 2021 census, the town of Olib has 113 residents and 64 occupied private households.

Town of Olib: Population trends 1857–2021
v

population	1195	1297	1256	1371	1495	1331	1331	1128	914	805	585	569	226	714	147	132	113
	1857	1869	1880	1890	1900	1910	1921	1931	1948	1953	1961	1971	1981	1991	2001	2011	2021

Sources: Croatian Bureau of Statistics publications

== Important Bird Area ==
The island is part of the northern Zadar Archipelago, which has been designated an Important Bird Area (IBA) by BirdLife International because it supports breeding populations of several species of fish-eating seabirds.

== Notable people ==
The literary estate of Vinko Pulišić remained at his palace in Olib, inherited by his nephew don Ivan Pulišić, and upon the latter's death in 1962 by his sister Marija "Marušica", who allowed Manfred Paštrović to transport them to his house on Silba in 1973. Today they are kept by the Arhiv Zadarske nadbiskupije.

The Croatian-American soccer player Christian Pulisic also traces his ancestry to Olib, his paternal grandfather having been a native of the island.

== Gallery ==
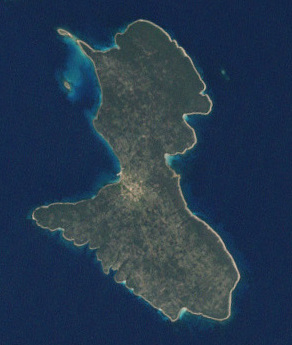
Satellite view of Olib

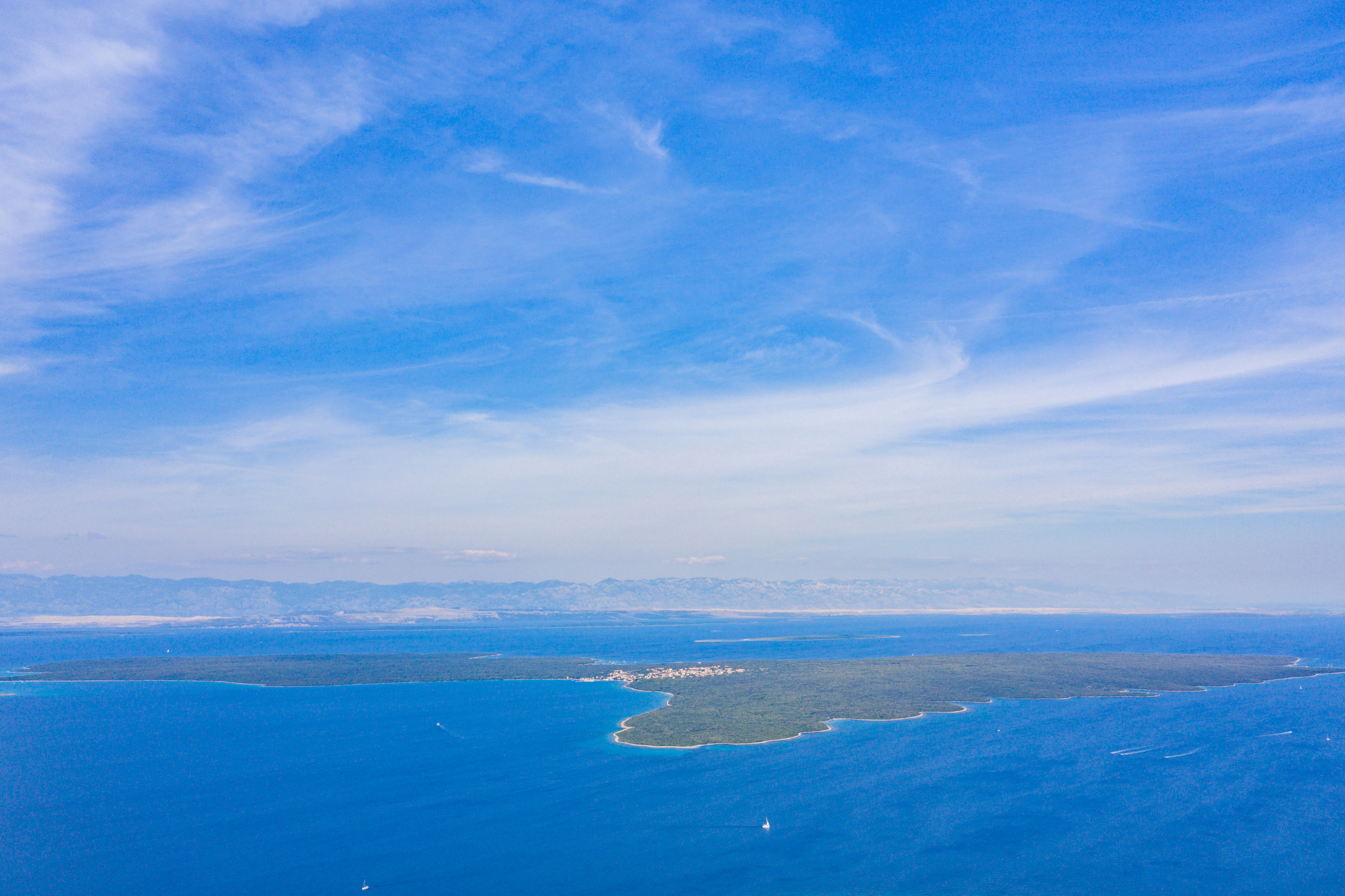
Aerial view of Olib

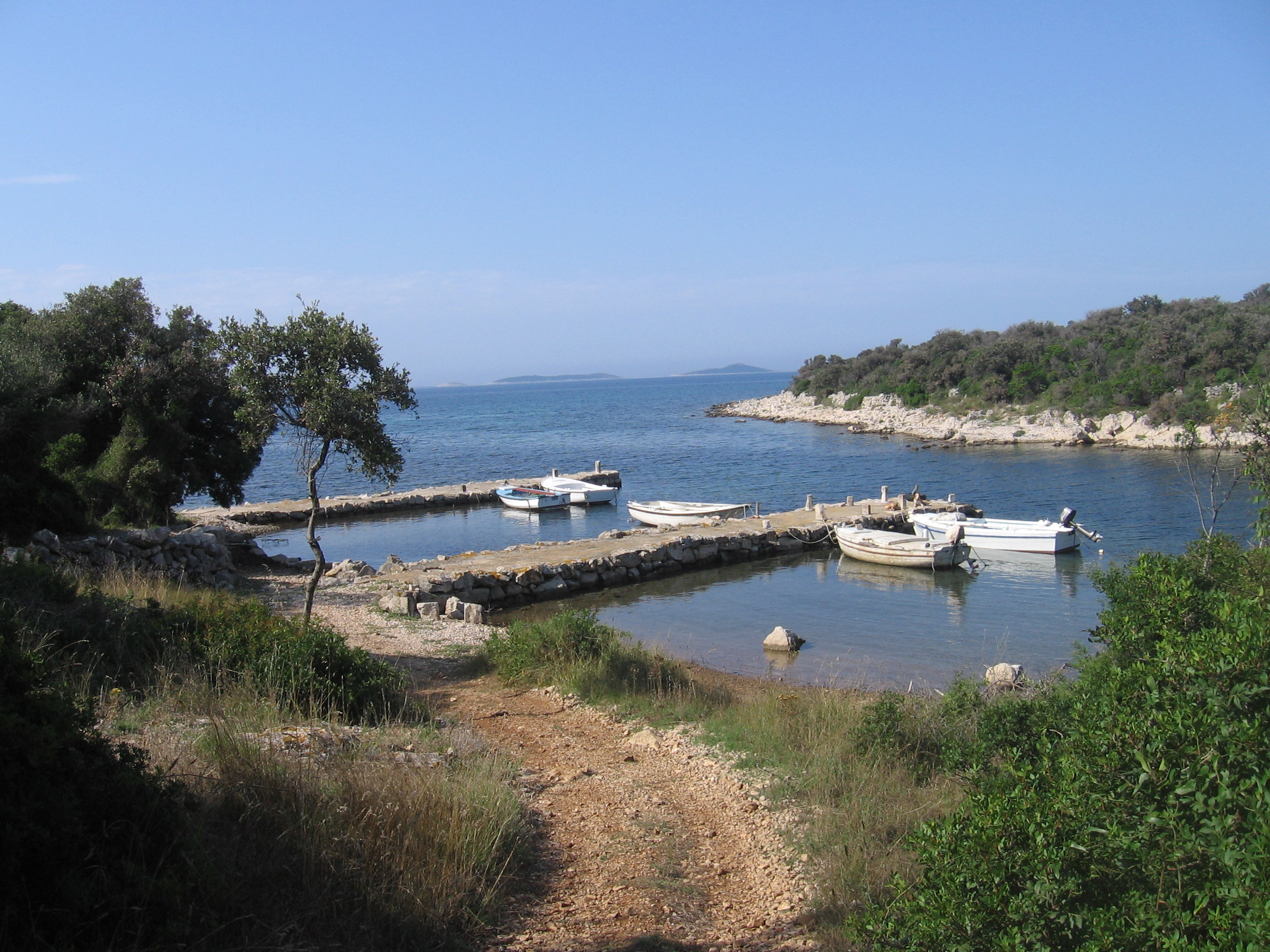
Banjve port

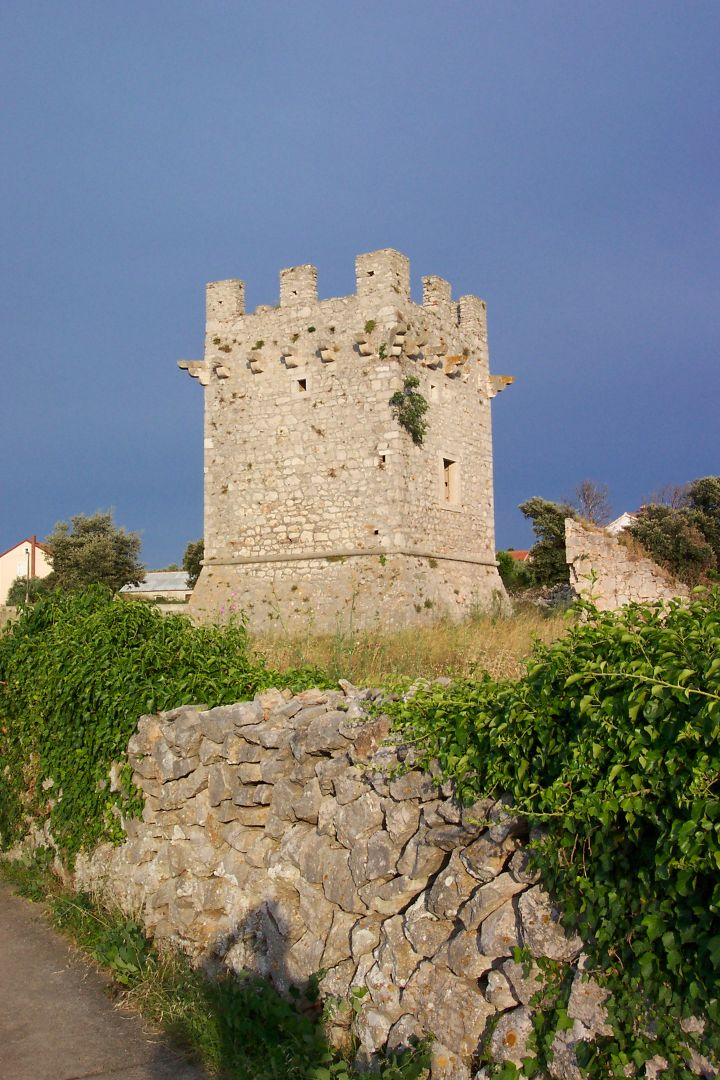
Tower of Olib

== Bibliography ==
- IKA (2015-06-15). "Umro don Mihovil Cukar". Informativna katolička agencija.
- Perović, Anamaria (2020). "Nekoliko osobitosti sređivanja korespondencije na primjeru osobnog arhivskog fonda Vinka Pulišića, zadarskoga nadbiskupa i metropolita Dalmacije" [Some peculiarities of arranging correspondence on the example of the personal papers of Vinko Pulišić, the Archbishop of Zadar and Metropolitan of Dalmatia]. Arhivski vjesnik (in Serbo-Croatian). 63: 117–139. doi:10.36506/av.63.5. eISSN 1848-3143.
- Goja, Bojan (2022). "Grobnica obitelji Filippi na Gradskom groblju u Zadru – povijest izgradnje i autori" [Tomb of the Filippi family at the City Cemetery in Zadar – the history of its construction and the authors]. Vjesnik dalmatinskih arhiva (in Serbo-Croatian). 3 (published 2023-02-24): 127–142. doi:10.58565/vda.3.1.5. eISSN 2806-8459.
- Magaš, Damir; Faričić, Josip (2002). "Problemi suvremene socio-geografske preobrazbe otoka Oliba" [The Problems of the Contemporary Socio-Geographic Transformation of the Olib Island] (PDF). Geoadria (in Croatian). 7 (2): 35–62. doi:10.15291/geoadria.88.
