= Premuda =

Island off the coast of Croatia

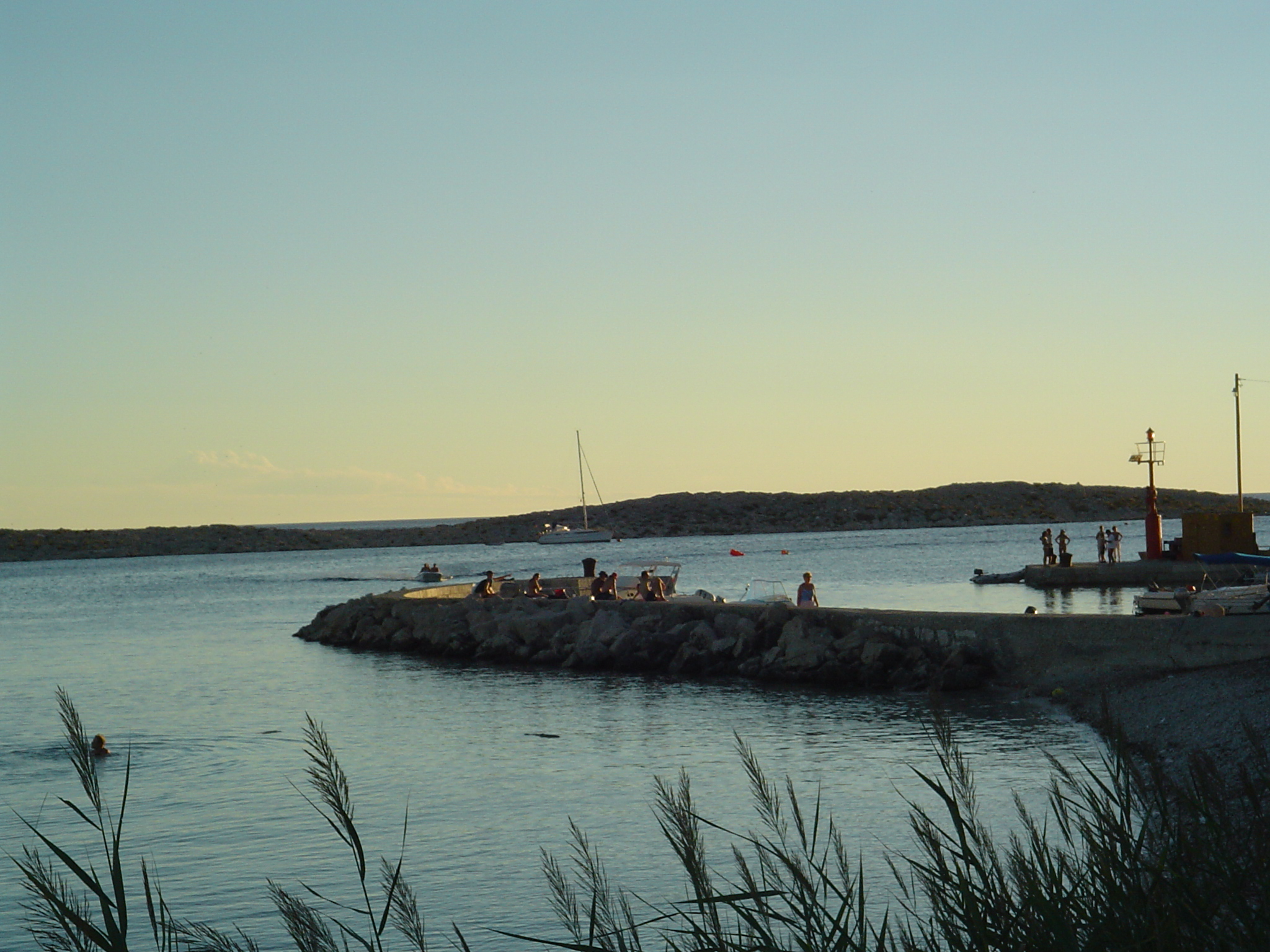
- Harbour of Premuda
- Interactive map of Premuda

Geography
- Location: Adriatic Sea
- Coordinates: 44°20′N 14°36′E
- Archipelago: Zadar Archipelago
- Area: 9.2 km^{2} (3.6 sq mi)
- Length: 8.86 km (5.505 mi)
- Width: 1.60 km (0.994 mi)
- Highest elevation: 88 m (289 ft)
- Highest point: Varh

Administration
- Croatia
- County: Zadar County
- Largest settlement: Premuda

Demographics
- Population: 64 (2011)
- Pop. density: 6.96/km^{2} (18.03/sq mi)

Premuda (Croatian pronunciation: [ˈprɛmuːda]) is a small island in Croatia, off the northern Adriatic coast. It belongs to the north Dalmatian islands which are situated north-west from the county center Zadar. Premuda is approximately 9 km (6 mi) long, up to 1.6 km (1.0 mi) wide, and has an area of 9.2 km^{2} (3.6 sq mi). It is situated southwest of Silba and northwest of Škarda and as such it is one of the outermost Adriatic islands from the perspective of the Croatian coastline.

== Name ==
Historically, the island was referred to in Glagolitic texts as Dlačnik. In the 18th century, the pronunciation Dlašnik arose, which by the end of the 18th and in the 19th century often became Dlasnik on Silba, where cakanje predominated.

== History ==
Premuda was first mentioned in historical sources by Tabula Peutingeriana, as Pamodos. In the 7th century, the island is mentioned as Primodia, derived from Latin primus ("the first"), indicating its geographical position as the first island in the Zadar Channel seen from the northwest. In 16th and 17th centuries Premuda was targeted by Ottoman corsairs who took the islanders away as slaves. This reduced the island's population to just 26 in 1608. In the 18th century, the island recovered through immigration, mostly from Olib, and by 1760 the population grew to 322.

Natural water resources on Premuda are scarce, which has historically been a limiting factor in the island's development. The island's population peaked at 577 inhabitants in 1857, and has steadily declined since, particularly in the second half of the 20th century, when many islanders moved to Zadar and Rijeka, and also to North and South America.

Electricity was introduced to Premuda in 1971. The elementary school, opened in 1867, was closed in 1991. The island's telephone network was built in 1998.

== Economy ==
The only settlement on the island, the town of Premuda, has about 60 inhabitants but the population strongly varies during the summer season. The population of Premuda is cultivating olives and breeding sheep and in the last few years they have become involved in tourism. There are three restaurants on the island.

Premuda is a destination for nautical and diving tourists, and has a number of diving spots. The "Katedrala" is a system of connected caves with light rays that fall through the porous ceiling of the caves. Another well-known underwater site is the wreck of the World War I Austro-Hungarian battleship SMS Szent István, which is located 8 NM off the coast of Premuda at a depth of 68 metres (223 ft).

== Important Bird Area ==
The island is part of the northern Zadar Archipelago, which has been designated an Important Bird Area (IBA) by BirdLife International because it supports breeding populations of several species of fish-eating seabirds.

== Bibliography ==
- Vajs, Nada (1987-06-28). "O zaboravljenim hrvatskim imenima jadranskih otoka". Rasprave Instituta za hrvatski jezik (in Serbo-Croatian) (1): 163–173. ISSN 1849-0379.
  - Add more information to article from this source
- Đinđić, Filip; Horvat, Manda; Mutak, Katica (2007). "Inventarizacija etnološke građe na otoku Premudi" [Taking an inventory of ethnological materials of the island of Premuda] (PDF). Etnološka tribina (in Croatian). 37 (30): 67–94.
- Magaš, Damir; Faričić, Josip; Surić, Maša (1999). "Osnovna prirodno-geografska obilježja otoka Premude u zadarskom arhipelagu" [Basic Physicogeographical Characteristics of the Premuda Island in the Zadar Archipelago] (PDF). Geoadria (in Croatian). 4 (1): 61–88. doi:10.15291/geoadria.151.
- Magaš, Damir; Faričić, Josip; Surić, Maša (2000). "Western Islands of the Zadar Archipelago (South Croatia) - Geographical Problems of the Coastal Development and Engineering" (PDF). Periodicum Biologorum. 102 (Supl.1): 147–156.
