= Silba =

Island of Croatia

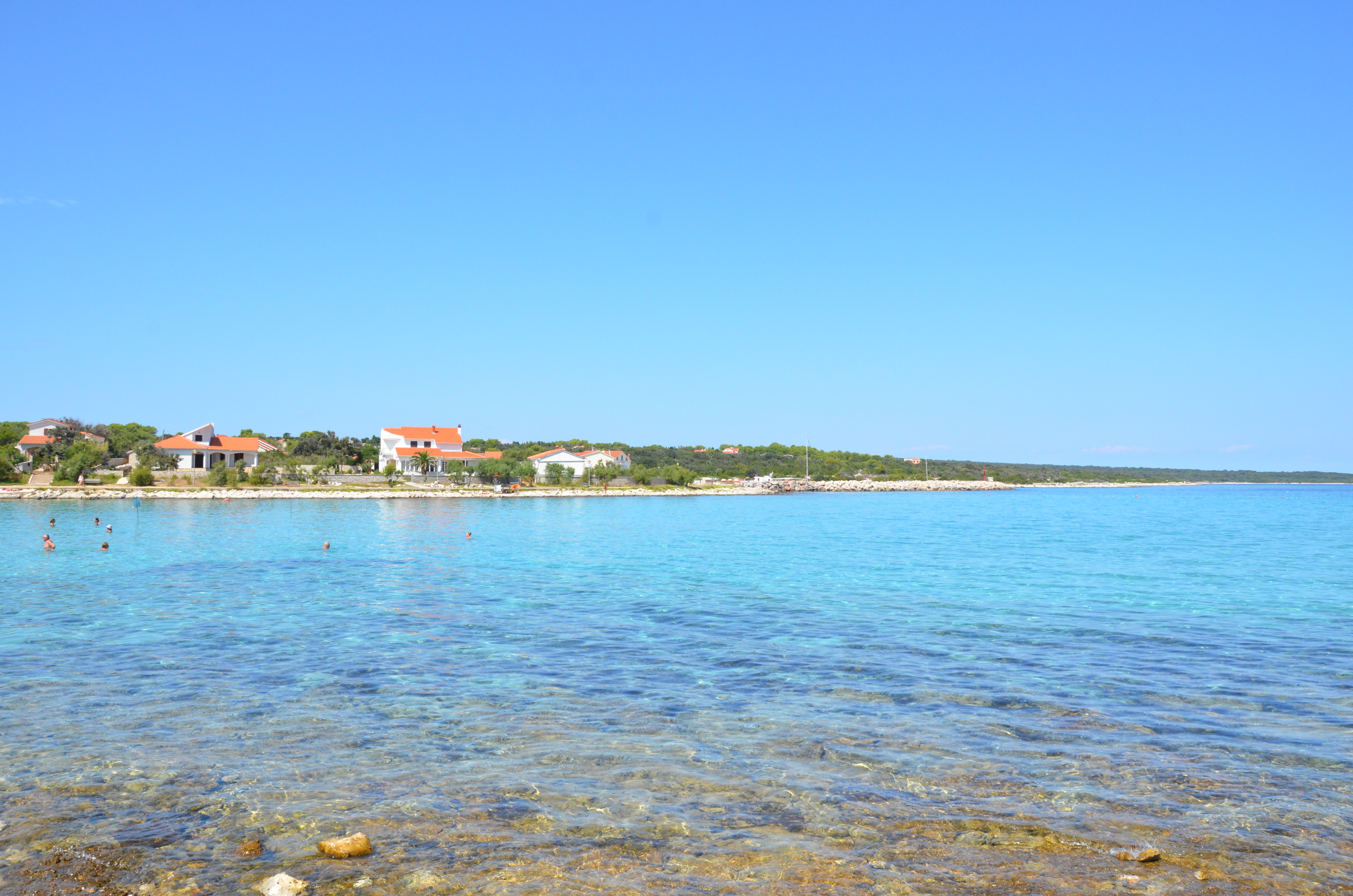
- Sotorišće bay on Silba

Geography
- Location: Adriatic Sea
- Coordinates: 44°22′29″N 14°41′43″E
- Area: 15 km^{2} (5.8 sq mi)
- Highest elevation: 80 m (260 ft)
- Highest point: Varh

Administration
- Croatia
- County: Zadar County

Demographics
- Population: 292 (2011)
- Pop. density: 20.46/km^{2} (52.99/sq mi)

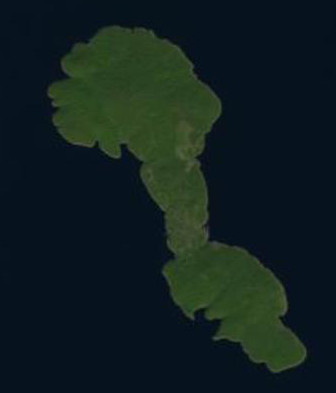
Satellite image

Silba (pronounced [sîlba]) is an island in Croatia with an area of 15 km^{2}, northern Dalmatia, south-east of Lošinj, between the islands of Premuda and Olib. It has a Mediterranean climate with 2570 hours a year of sunshine. Most summer days are hot, bright and clear with light westerly maestral wind cooling the island in the afternoons.

Silba has an area 15 square kilometres (6 sq mi) in the shape of number 8, with the village of Silba located at the narrowest point in the middle. It takes only around 10 minutes to walk the 600 m from the north-eastern harbour of Mul to the south-western harbour of Žalić.

Officially, Silba's population is 292, but it varies seasonally; from a few hundred, mainly pensioners, in the winter, to several thousand during summer months. Many have jobs and properties on the mainland. There is also an influx of tourists during the summer months as tourism is now the main economic activity on the island. The whole island is a pedestrian zone, no traffic is allowed with the exception of vehicles supplying the local businesses.

Zadar is Silba's mainland administrative center; it is part of the Zadar County.

== Geography ==
The island has numerous small beaches and coves. The main public beach Sotorišće, located close to the harbour of Mul, has very clear shallow waters with sandy bottom. On Žalić, there are a number of pebbly beaches and a pier. Ships carrying passenger and commercial traffic dock here.

There are a number of coves outside the village that can be reached by footpaths. On the southern side of the island, at walking distances of about 30–45 minutes, are:

- Vele Stene, the only point on the island where the shores are steep and rocky.
- Port Sv. Ante, favoured with yachtsmen because it is protected from major winds.

One can also view a small chapel on the side of the bay.

- Dobre Vode, a beach with shallow sandy bottom.
- Nozdre, a big cove with characteristic flat rock formations cut out by the sea.

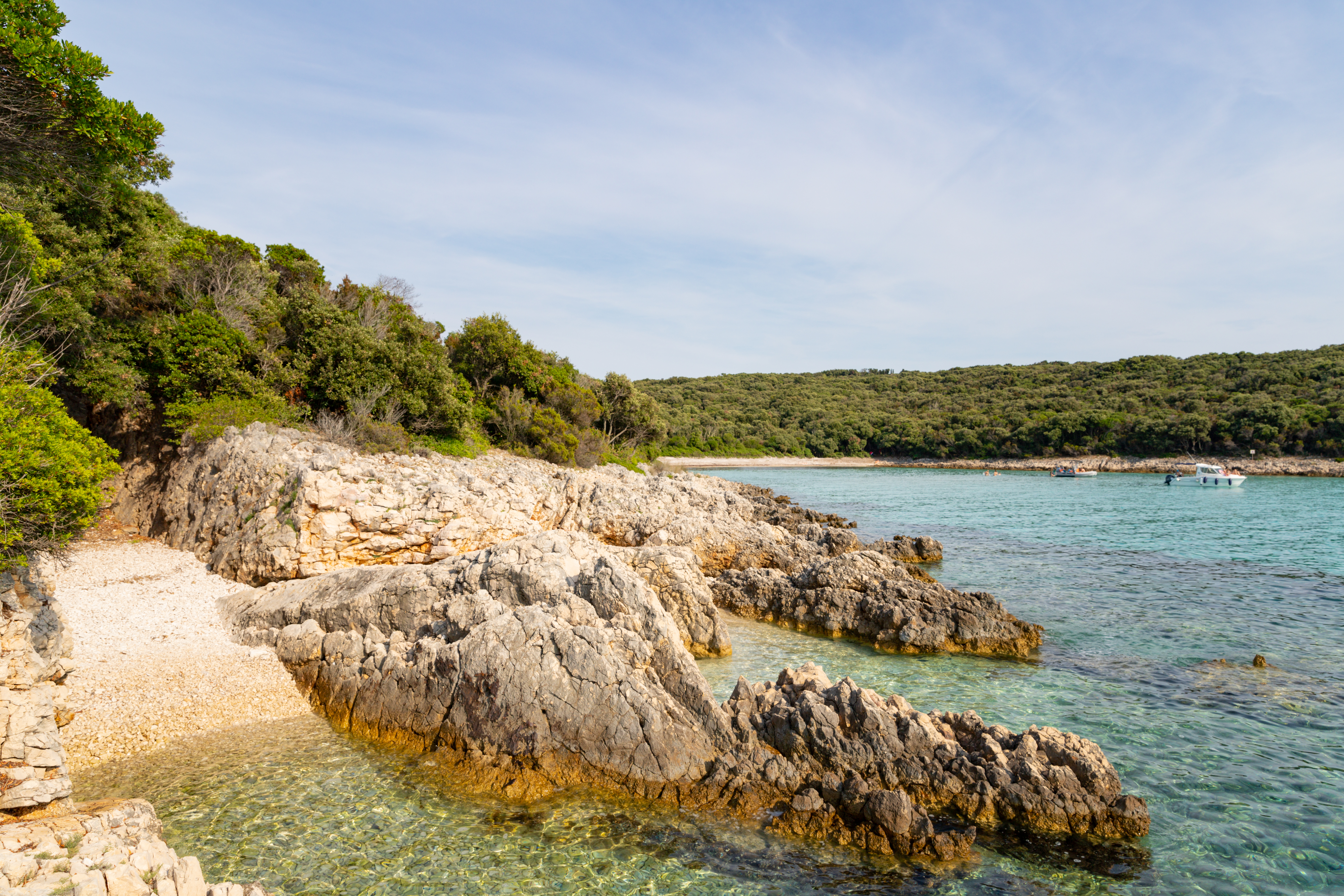
Uvala Pernestica viewed from a zawn on its north shore. Characteristic of the north of Silba.

On the north side of the village is the highest point on Silba, Varh (86m). The northern shore is less accessible than the southern due to rocky shores, however, there is a path leading north out of the village to the small port of Papranica. Further on along the path, about an hours walk from the main village, is a cove Pernastica which is considered one of the nicest coves on the island. It faces westwards towards the sunset and has a long shallow sandy bottom.

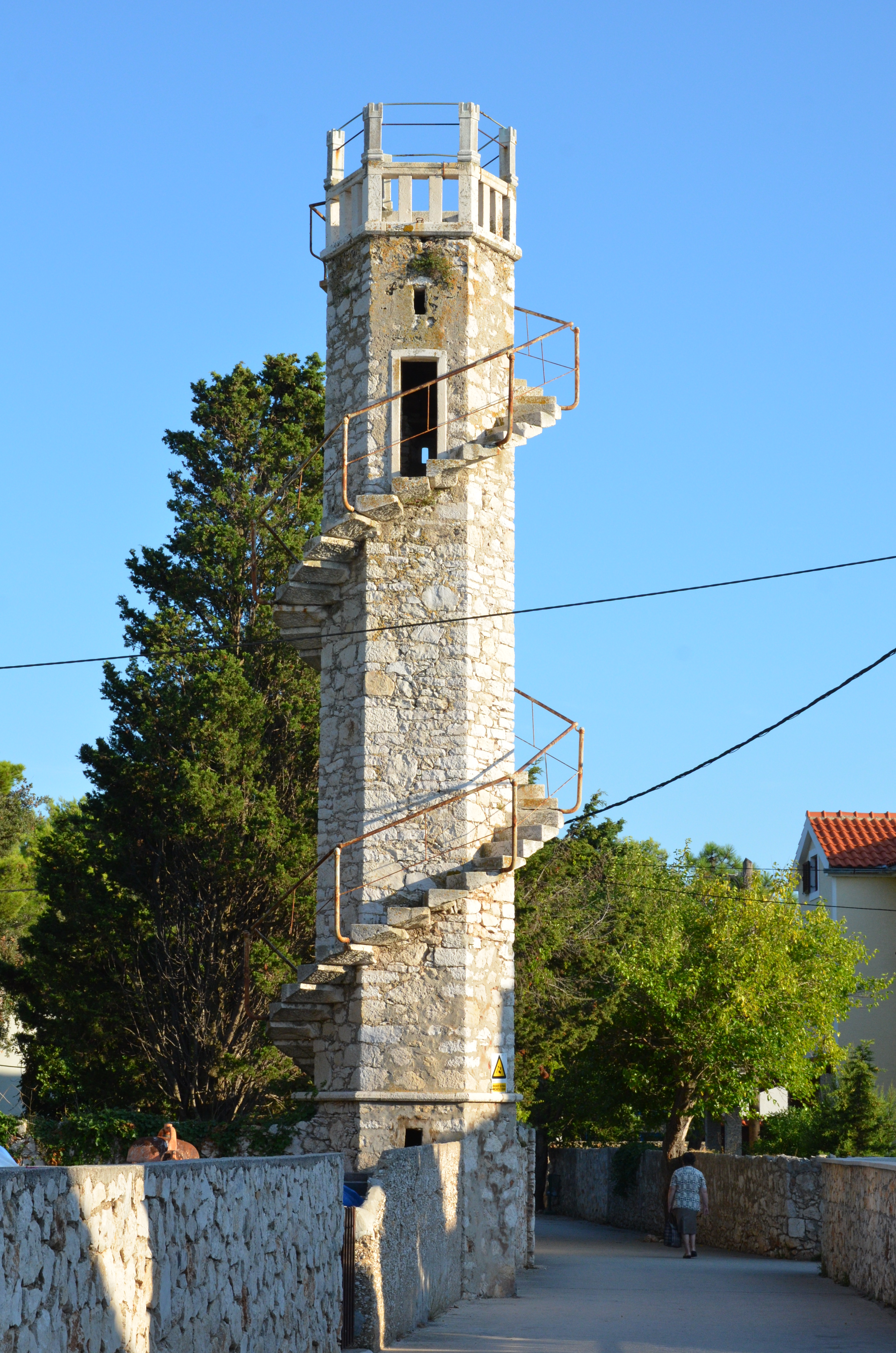
Toreta - iconic observation tower on the island of Silba

One of the symbols of Silba is the "Torretta Marinich", a hexagonal observation tower, 15 m high, with an external spiral staircase. It was built by the Podestà, Captain Pietro Marinich (1816-1897), in the garden of the family house built in 1872, then accompanied by the chapel consecrated in 1894. It is in the centre of the village right on Veli Put - Silba's High Street. The village has several cafés, four restaurants, a number of shops, post office and a local GP. From any point in the village it takes only around 10 min or less to walk to the nearest beach.

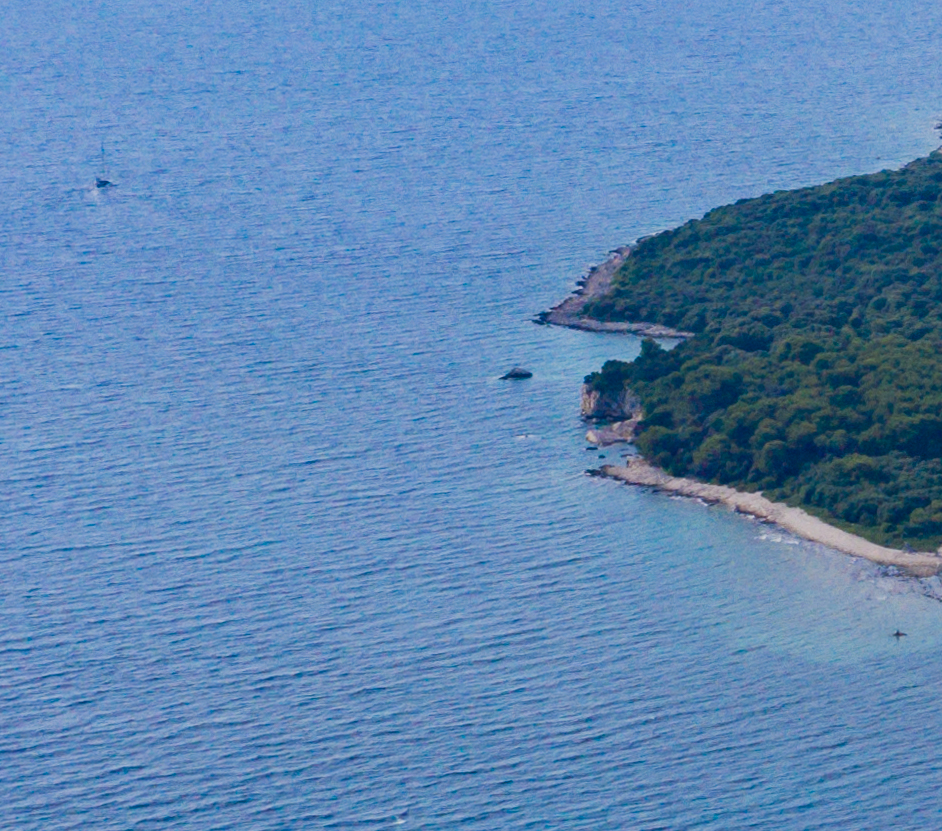
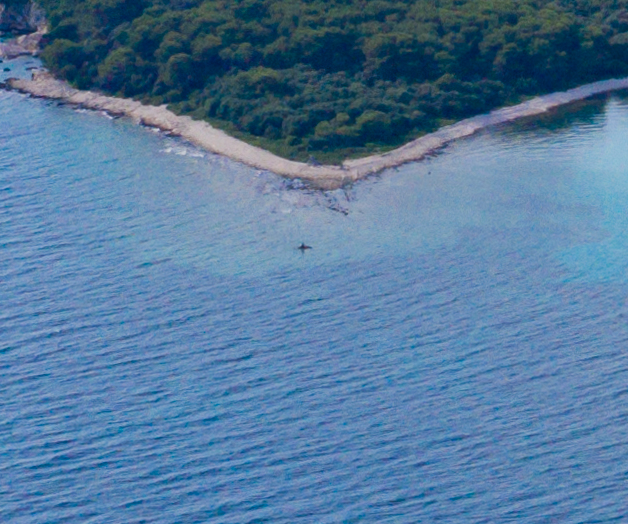
Islets and shallows of Silba. Školjić on the left, Škar on the right.
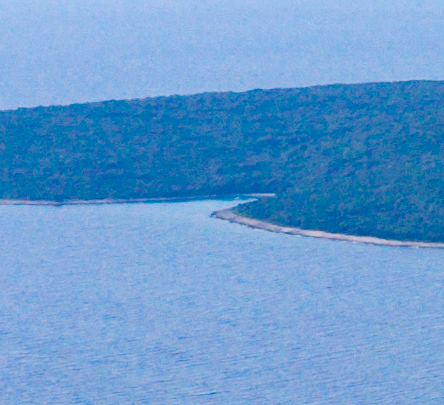
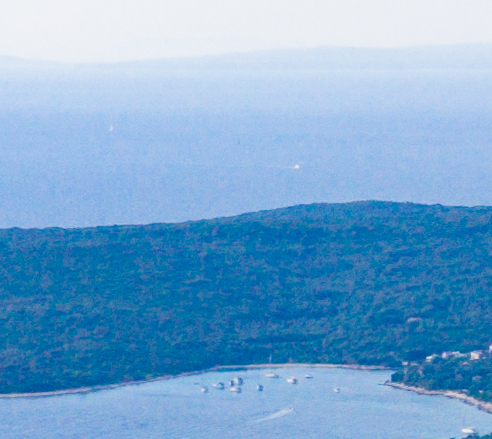
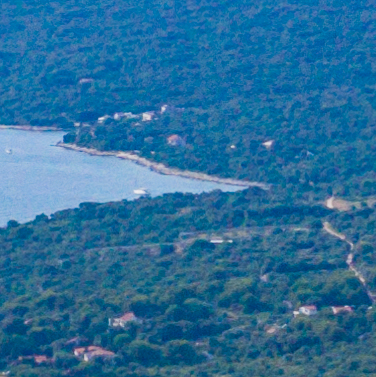
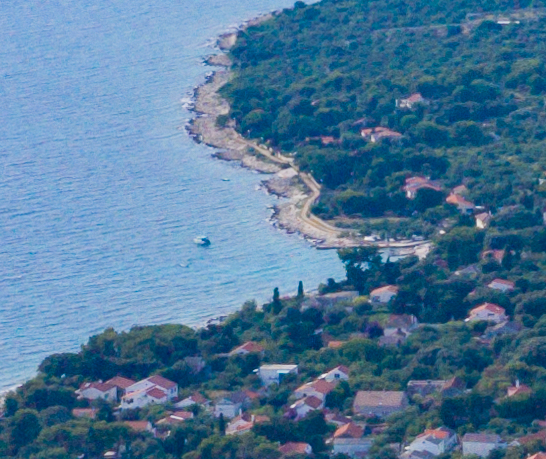
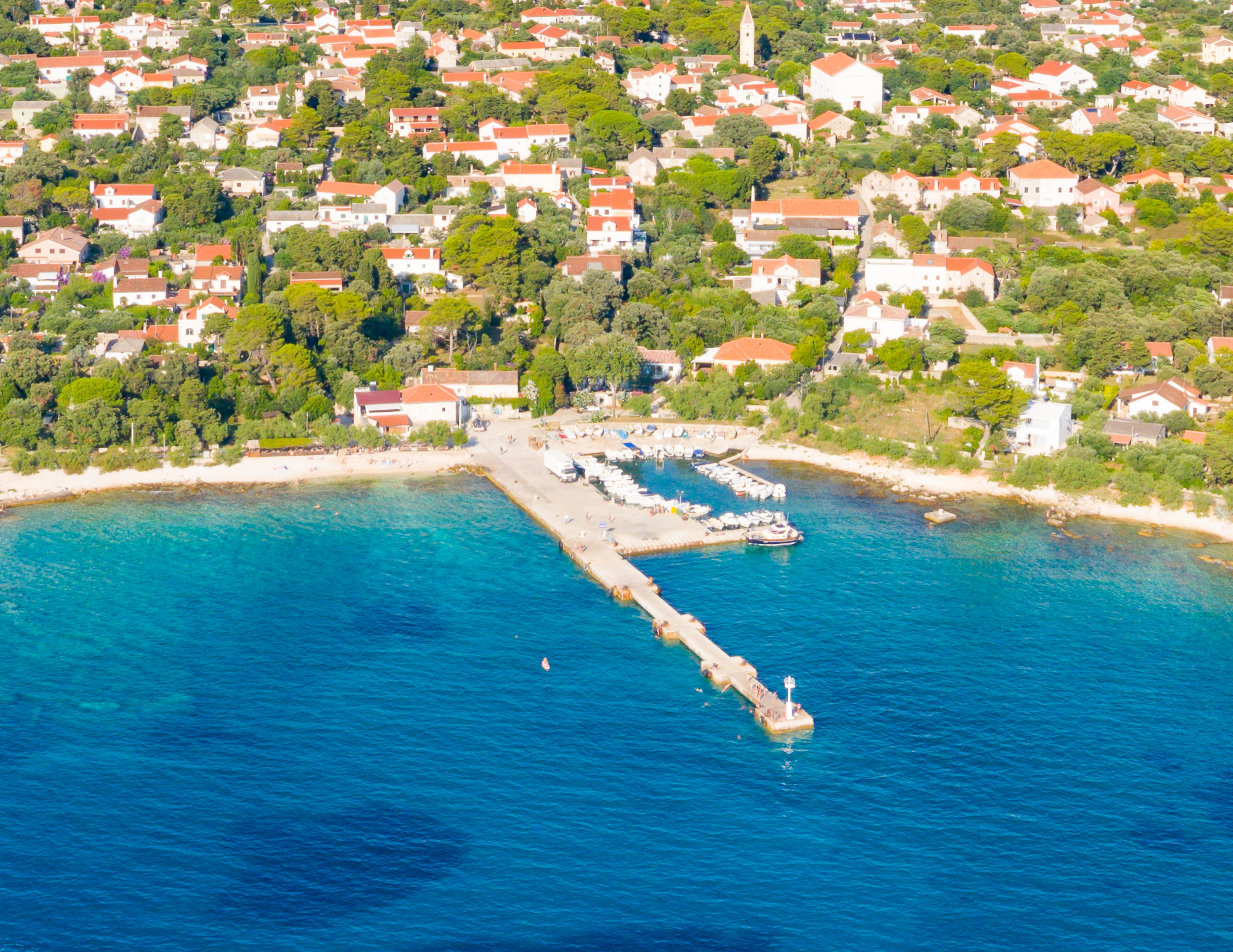
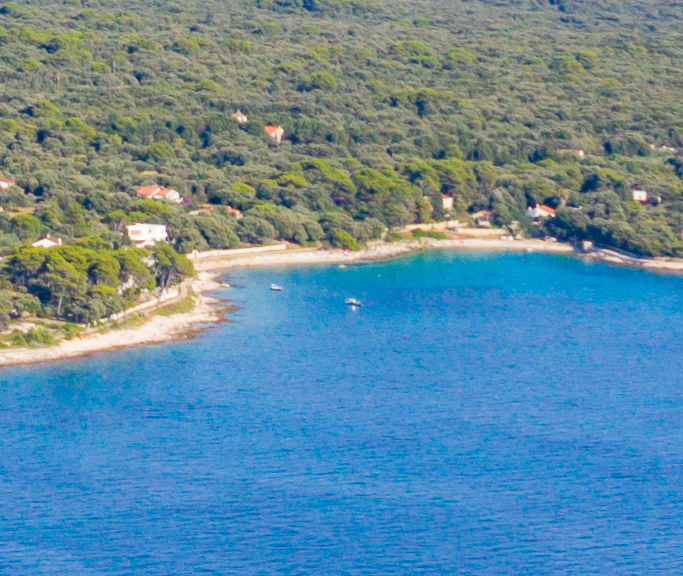
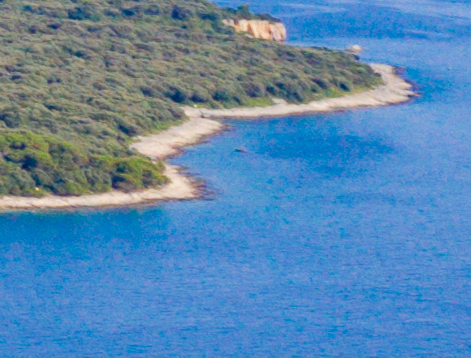
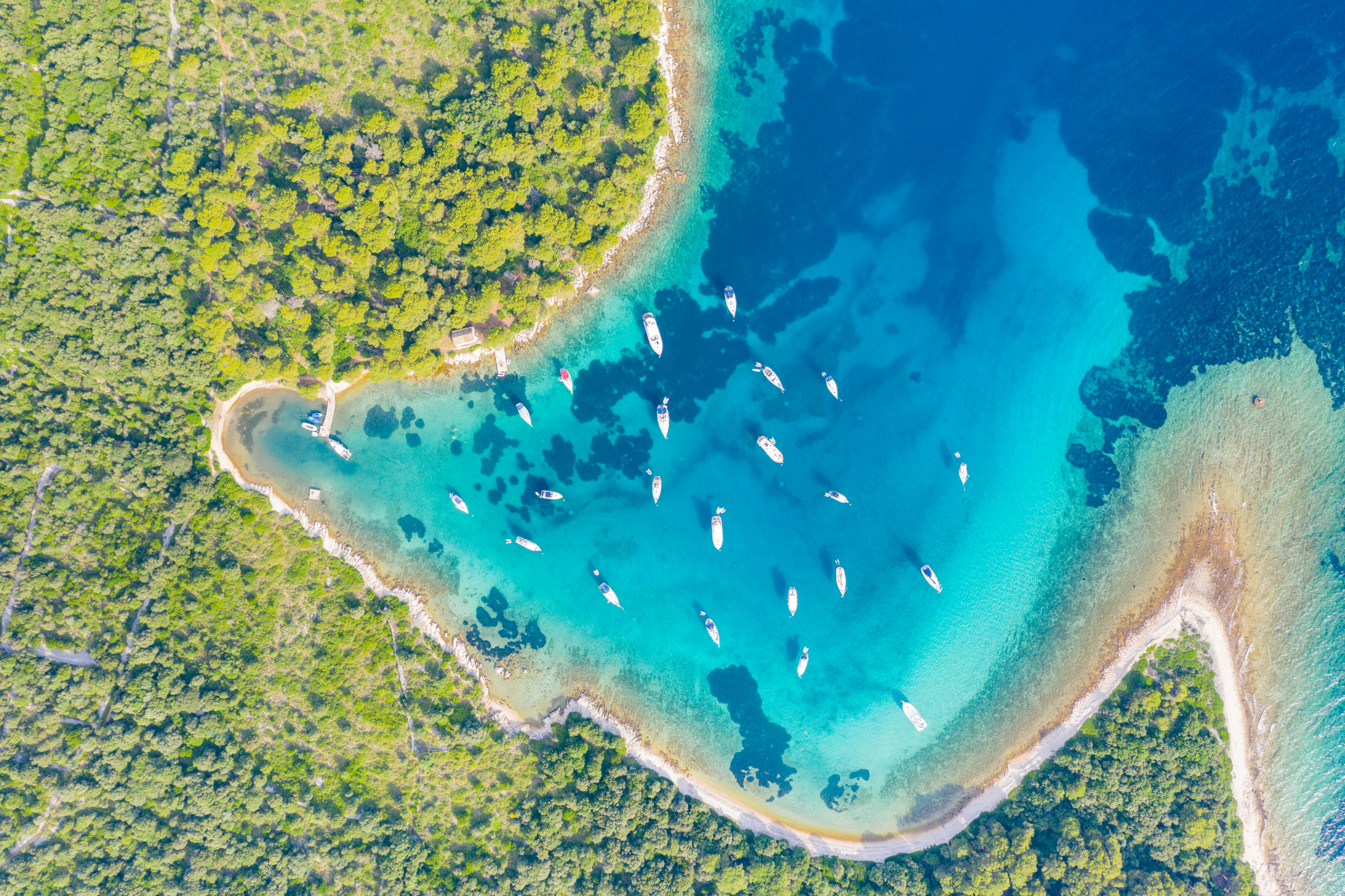
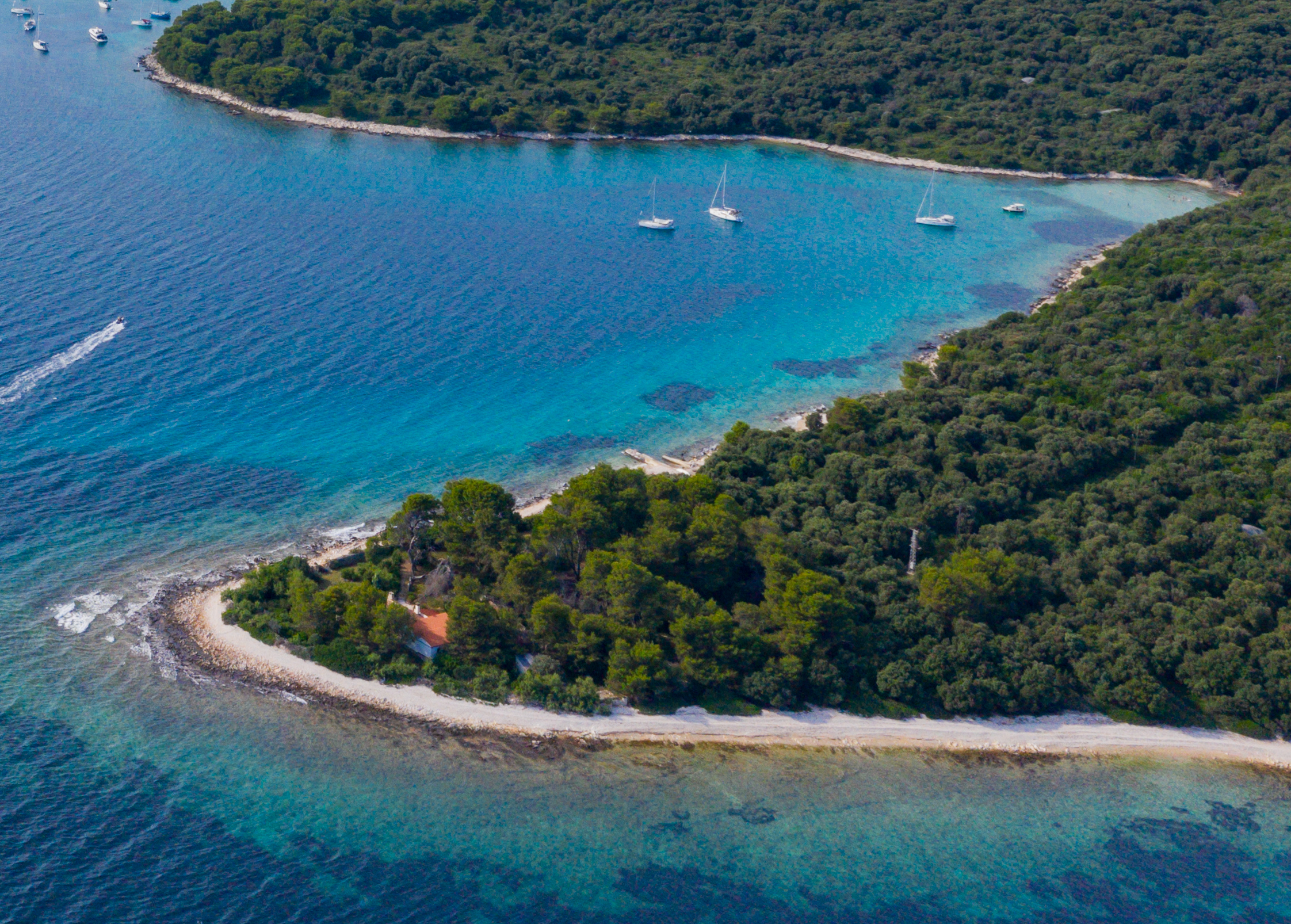
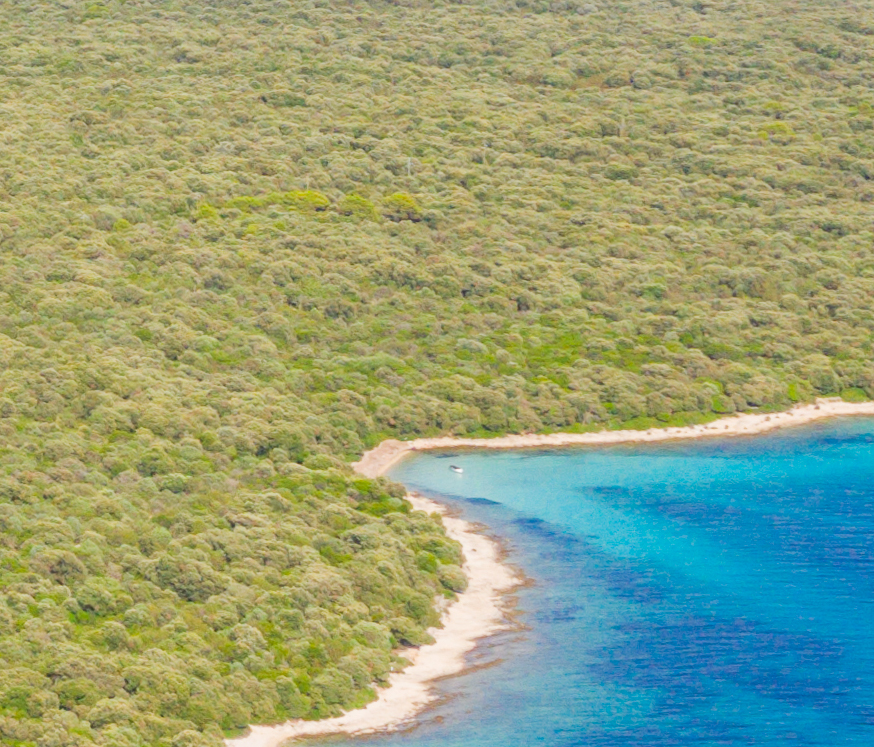
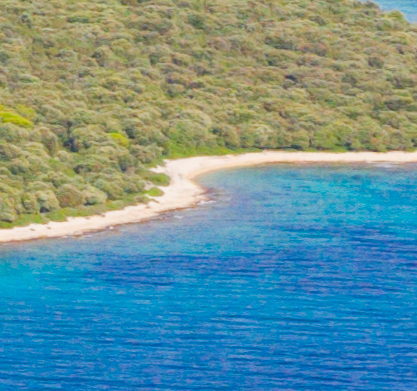
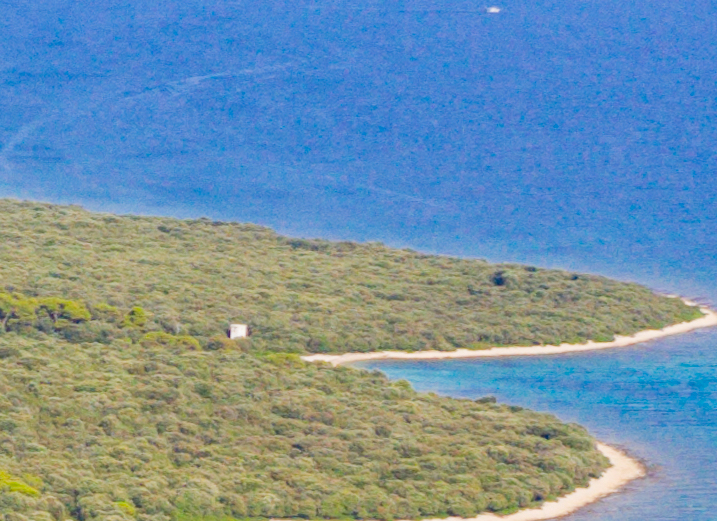
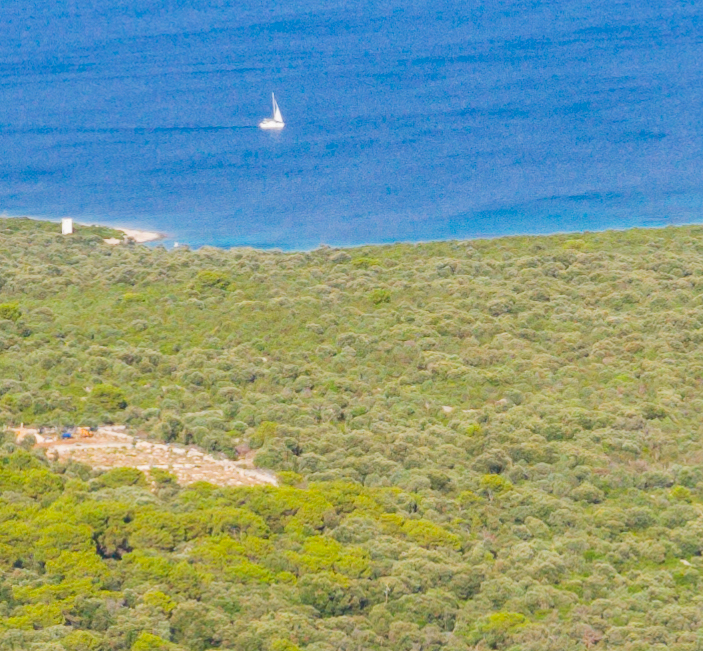
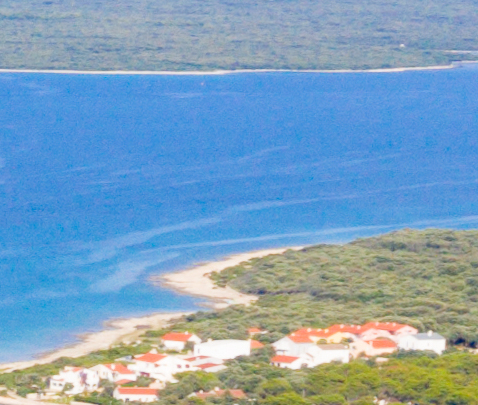
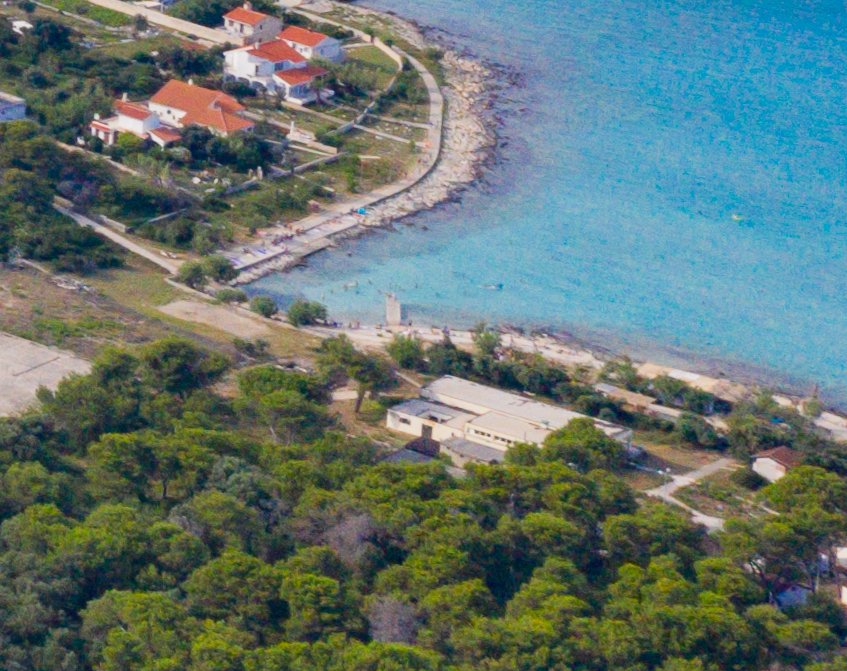
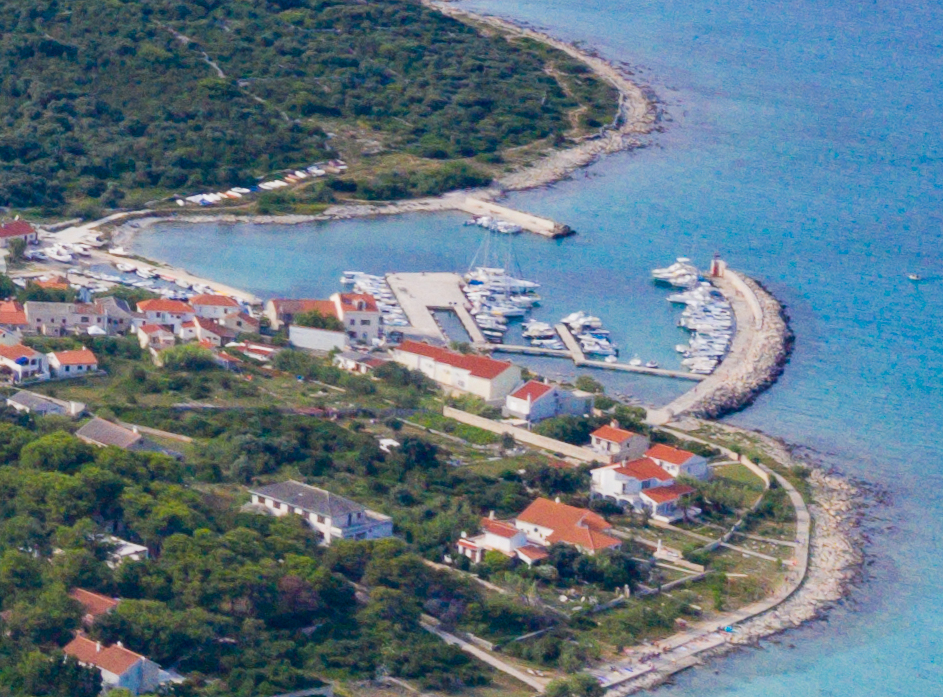
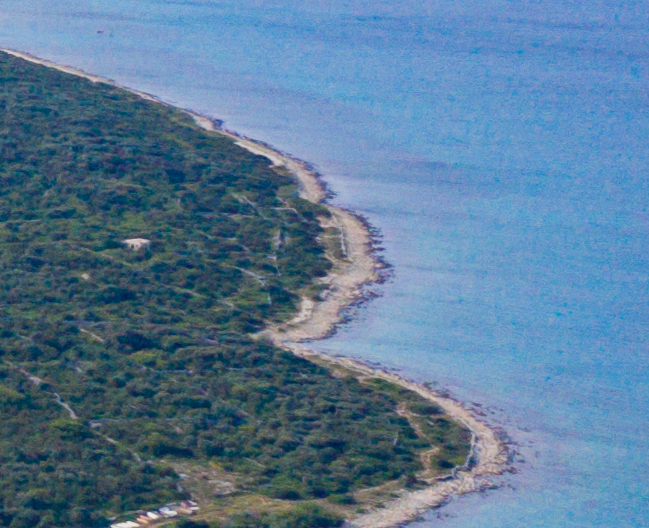
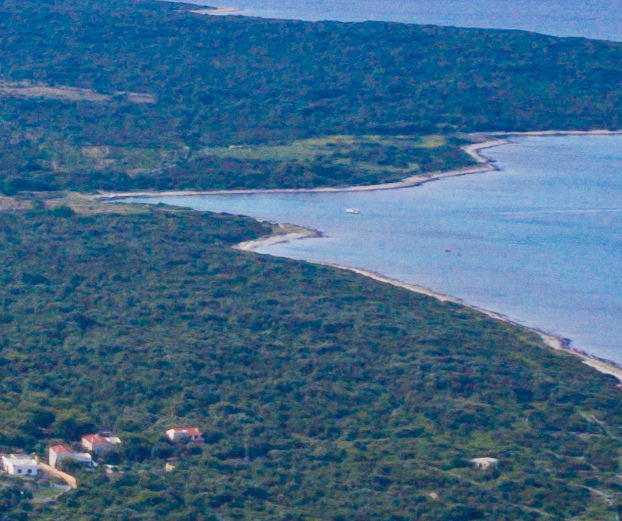
Bays of Silba. Clockwise from upper left: Uvala Lojišće, Luka Papranica, Bujusna Uvala, Čarpusina Uvala, Žalić, Uvala Pocukmarak, Uvala Ugljenica, Luka Sveti Ante, Uvala Južni Porat, Mavrova Uvala, Uvala Dobra Voda, Uvala Slatina, Uvala Nozdre, Kadetova Uvala, Sotorišće, Luka Silba, Zaniska Uvala, Draga.
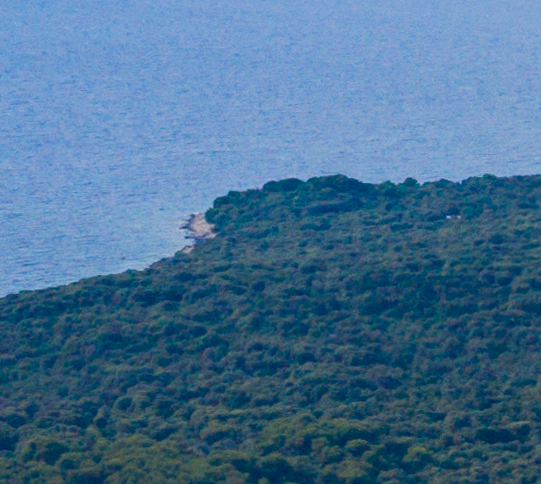
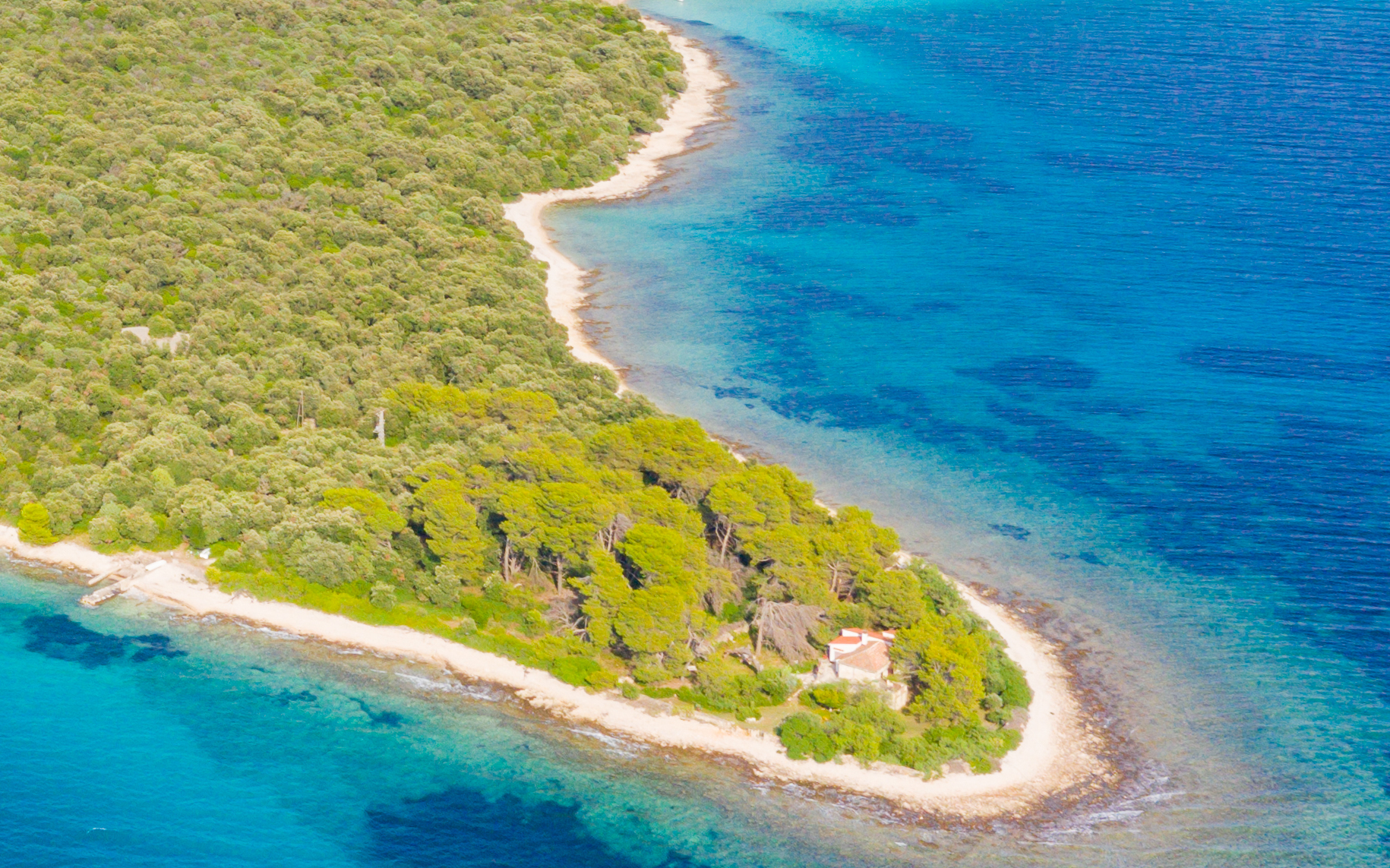
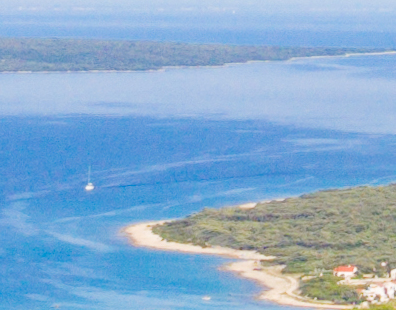
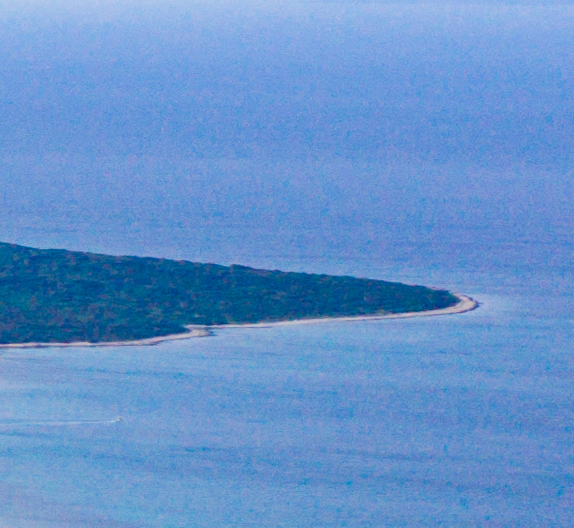
Capes of Silba. Clockwise from upper left: Rt Pocukmara, Mavrov Rt, Rt Marta, Rt Karf.

== Climate ==
Since records began in 1981, the highest temperature recorded at the local weather station was 37.1 °C (98.8 °F), on 8 August 2013. The coldest temperature was −7.5 °C (18.5 °F), on 4 February 2012.

== Important Bird Area ==
The island is part of the northern Zadar Archipelago, which has been designated an Important Bird Area (IBA) by BirdLife International because it supports breeding populations of several species of fish-eating seabirds.

== History ==
The old name for this island is Selbo. It's supposed to come from the Latin word "Silva", meaning "forest". The island Silba is mentioned in historical records in the 9th century. In 827, it belonged to the Zadar county. In 1073, in the last year of Petar Krešimir's reign, probably at the request of his sister Cika, the first nun of St. Maria in Zadar, the county donated the island to the monastery St. Maria, at the ceremony of sacrament of their church (some say this happened in 1027). Later, the island fell into the hands of the Venetian authorities, which sold it to captain Fani Soppe for 12,350 ducats.

It is not known how it later came into the ownership of Venetian family Morosini. Silba was held by family Morosini until the first quarter of 19th century. As it was too far to govern and receive tax on yield in nature they agreed with inhabitants of Silba in 1770 to receive each year 2000 Venetian lira in rent. Silbans called this rent četvrtina (quarter), as it amounted to a quarter of the land's yields, which is what serfs elsewhere also gave to their masters.

In 1838, for 28,500 Austrian lira, family Morosini sold the island to Marko Ragusin from Veli Lošinj, who returned wealthy from United States.

As Silbans paid rent to previous owner in currency, they assumed they will do the same to the new landowner, but since he lived in Lošinj, near to Silba, he refused and demanded a quarter of land's yield in crop. A lawsuit ensued which lasted for 13 years when Ragusin finally decided to sell the island to these same inhabitants who bought it, each paying proportionally to the size of their plot, in total 5,025 bavarian thalers. On 19 March 1852 ownership of the island by inhabitants was registered. It became the island's main holiday, day of Saint Joseph.

In the 18th century Silba had a fleet 38 three-masted sailing boats called Manzere of 220 Mt and 60 two-masted sailing boats called Kastrere of 63 Mt. The fleet was destroyed by the French at the beginning of the 19th century. The economic benefits to the island from sailing boats led to general well-being on the island. An old local saying goes: Silba zlatom siva, i u njoj se raj uživa, that is: "Silba shines with gold, on it heavenly enjoyment".

There used to be a custom of "village king" elections. The king would get elected on Saint Stephen's Day (26 December) and his rule would last until Three Kings (6 January). During his twelve-day rule, he would preside, crowned and surrounded by twelve councillors, over village gatherings and deal out justice. His task was to name the village head, the head and members of village guards, close the previous year's budget and plan the next year's. He would hand down verdicts regarding the complaints and disputes that had accumulated during the year. This custom died out in the first quarter of the 19th century. The king's crown still exists in the treasury of the parish church.

In 1943 Silba was the scene of a naval action during the Adriatic Campaign of World War II.

== Bibliography ==
- Lazarević, Aleksandra-Sanja (1985-12-01). "Tradicijska prehrana na otocima Silbi i Olibu (Pokušaj interdisciplinarnog pristupa)" [Traditional Food Consumption on the Islands of Silba and Olib: an Interdisciplinary Approach]. Etnološka tribina (in Serbo-Croatian). 15 (8): 61–70. ISSN 0351-1944.
- Šebečić, Berislav; Šinkovec, Boris; Trutin, Mladen (1999-12-04). "Donjopaleogenski boksiti Vinišća, Ugljana, Silbe i Oliba" [Lower Paleogene Bauxites of Vinišće, Ugljan, Silba and Olib]. Rudarsko-geološko-naftni zbornik (in Serbo-Croatian). 11 (1): 17–26. ISSN 0353-4529.
- Vigato, Ivica (2010-04-30). "Stranci u silbenskim matičnim knjigama iz 17., 18. i prve polovice 19. stoljeća" [Foreigners in Silba Registers in the 17th, 18th, and the first half of the 19th century]. Folia onomastica Croatica (in Serbo-Croatian). pp. 223–265. eISSN 1848-7858.
- Goričanec, Lovro Krešimir (2020-11-16) [defended 2020-09-25]. Antička topografija otoka Silbe [The topography of Silba in Classical Antiquity] (Thesis) (in Serbo-Croatian). Zadar: Sveučilište u Zadru.
- Vejmelka, Jadranka; Tomić, Marijana; Vigato, Ivica (2021-12-21). "Prikaz knjige Bibliografija radova o otoku Silbi autora Ivana Boškovića i Helene Novak Penge u izdanju naklade Bošković". Čakavska rič. 44 (1–2): 215–220. eISSN 1849-1081.
- Bošković, Ivan; Bošković, Helena (2021). Bibliografija radova o otoku Silbi. Posebna izdanja. Vol. 29. Split: Naklada Bošković. ISBN 978-953-263-656-7.

=== Name ===
- Šenoa, Milan (1949). "Prilog poznavanju starih naziva naših otoka" [A Contribution to Learning the Old Names of Our Islands]. Hrvatski geografski glasnik (in Serbo-Croatian) (11–12) (published 1950-06-15): 75–82. ISSN 1331-5854.

=== Anthropology ===
- Mićković, Vlatko; Karlak, Ivan; Lazić, Jelenko; Lončar, Zoran; Domijan, Marina; Sirovatka, Goran (2018-12-29). "Harmonic Structure of Selected Ergonomic Anthropometric Sizes". Collegium antropologicum. 42 (4): 281–286. eISSN 1848-9486.

=== Archaeology ===
- Brusić, Zdenko (2011-10-04). "Ranosrednjovjekovni nalazi iz hrvatskog podmorja" [Early Medieval Finds from the Croatian Undersea World]. Archaeologia Adriatica (in Serbo-Croatian). 4: 243–255. eISSN 1848-9281.

=== Economy ===
- Tomljenović, Mladen (1983-12-01). "Ribolov na Silbi" [Fishing on Silba]. Etnološka tribina (in Serbo-Croatian). 11–12 (4–5): 45–48. ISSN 0351-1944.

=== Geology ===
- Waagen, Lukas (1909). Geologische Spezialkarte der im Reichsrate vertretenen Königreiche und Länder der Österreichisch-Ungarischen Monarchie 1:75.000 (PDF) (Map) (in German). Vienna. § 6253: Selve.
- Waagen, Lukas (1914). Erläuterungen zur Geologischen Karte der im Reichsrate vertretenen Königreiche und Länder der Österreichisch-Ungarischen Monarchie: SW-Gruppen Nr. 114 und 117a, Selve und Zapuntello (Zone 28, Kol. XI, und Zone 29, Kol. XI in Spezialkarte der Österr.-ung. Monarchie im Maßtab 1 : 75.000) (PDF) (in German). Vienna.
- Matoušek, Otakar (1927). "The Dalmatian Island Silba and its Geology". Věstník České akademie věd a umění. 27. ISSN 1802-5765.
- Moro, Alan; Ćosović, Vlasta (2013-02-28). "Upper Turonian–Santonian slope limestones of the Islands of Premuda, Ist and Silba (Adriatic Coast, Croatia)". Geologia Croatica. 66 (1): 1–13. doi:10.4154/GC.2013.01. eISSN 1333-4875.

=== Parish ===
- Modrić, Oliver (2025-01-27). "Prijenos i zbrinjavanje gradiva župnih arhiva u Arhiv Zadarske nadbiskupije" [Transfer and storage of materials of the parish archives to the Archives of the Archdiocese of Zadar]. Vjesnik dalmatinskih arhiva (in Serbo-Croatian). 5: 109–124. doi:10.58565/vda.5.1.5. eISSN 2806-8459.

=== Ornithology ===
- Mužinić, Jasmina; Purger, Jenő J. (2013). "Ptice otoka Silbe i obližnjih Grebena" [Birds of island Silba and nearby Grebeni]. Otok Silba, prirodno i kulturno blago (in Serbo-Croatian). Zadar: Sveučilište u Zadru. pp. 120–131. ISBN 978-953-331-028-2.
