= D106 road =

Road in Croatia

D106 state road

Route information
- Length: 73.8 km (45.9 mi)

Major junctions
- From: D8 in Posedarje
- A1 in Posedarje interchange D107 near Novalja; D108 near Povljane
- To: Žigljen ferry port

Location
- Country: Croatia
- Counties: Zadar, Lika-Senj
- Major cities: Pag, Novalja

Highway system
- Highways in Croatia

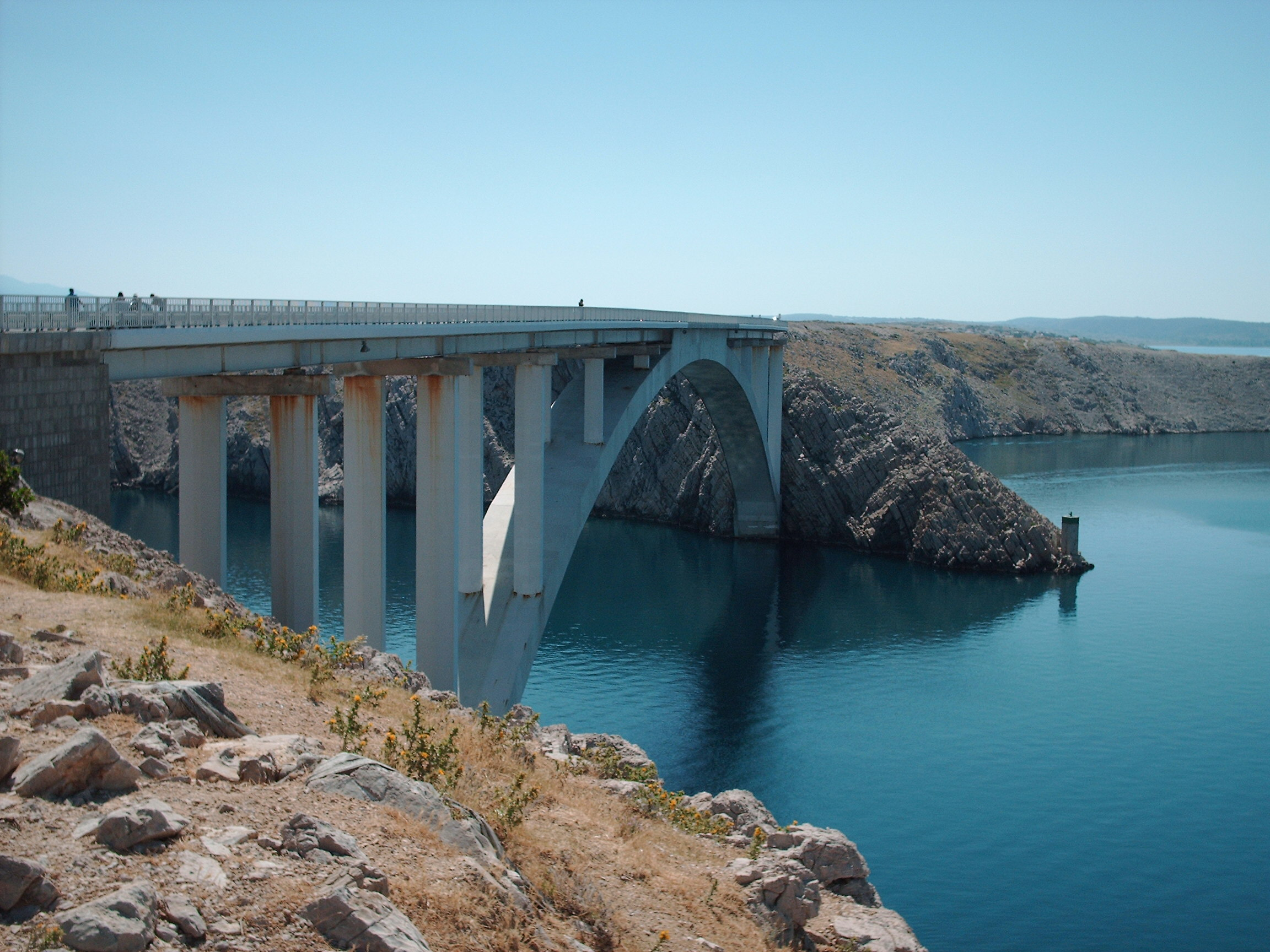
Pag Bridge, carrying the D106 state road

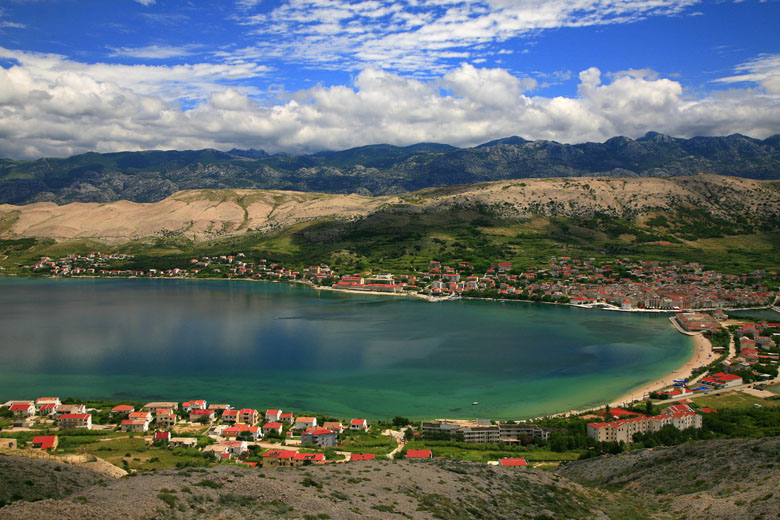
The city of pag, on the D106 road route

D106 is a state road connecting the mainland to island of Pag and terminating in Žigljen ferry port, from where Jadrolinija ferries fly to the mainland, docking at Prizna and D406 state road. The road is 73.8 km long.

D106 is the main road route on the island of Pag. The southern terminus of the road is located in Posedarje, at an intersection with D8 state route - the Adriatic Highway. The road uses Pag Bridge as a crossing between the mainland and Pag Island.

The road also comprises an interchange with A1 motorway in Posedarje interchange.

The road, as well as all other state roads in Croatia, is managed and maintained by Hrvatske ceste, a state-owned company.

== Traffic volume ==
Traffic is regularly counted and reported by Hrvatske ceste (HC), operator of the road. Furthermore, the HC report number of vehicles using Prizna-Žigljen ferry line, connecting D106 to the D406 state road. Substantial variations between annual (AADT) and summer (ASDT) traffic volumes are attributed to the fact that the road connects a number of summer resorts to Croatian motorway network.

D106 traffic volume
Road	Counting site	AADT	ASDT	Notes
D106	4801 Pag Bridge	2,931	5,497	Between Ž6005 and Ž6007 junctions.
D106	335 Prizna-Žigljen	816	2,601	Vehicles using Prizna-Žigljen ferry line.

== Road junctions and populated areas ==
D106 junctions/populated areas
Type	Slip roads/Notes
	Posedarje; D8 - connection to Zadar (northern part) and Maslenica. Southern terminus of the road.
	A1 - Posedarje interchange - connection to Zadar and Split to the south and to Gospić and Zagreb to the north.
	L63028 to Vinjerac
	Ž6017 to Slivnica
	Ž6018 to Radovin
	Jovići; Junction with L63027
	Ž6007 to Ražanac
	Ritna
	Pag Bridge - 301 m long arch bridge
	Miškovići
	Dinjiška
	Ž6005 to Vlašići
	to Vrčići
	Gorica; D108 to Povljane
	Pag; Junctions with L63001, L63007 and L63008
	L63005 to Košljun
	to Šimuni
	L63002 to Kolan - the route loops from D106 to the village and back, forming 2 intersections with D106
	to Gajac
	Ž5151 to Novalja and Lun
	L59007 to Novalja, Zubovići and Metajna
	D107 to Stara Novalja
	Žigljen ferry port - access to the mainland port of Prizna (by Jadrolinija) and D406 to Senj, Rijeka and Karlobag (via D8 state road); Northern terminus of the road.
