= D108 road (Croatia) =

Road in Croatia

D108 state road

Route information
- Length: 7.6 km (4.7 mi)

Major junctions
- From: D106 near Gorica
- To: Povljane

Location
- Country: Croatia
- Counties: Zadar
- Major cities: Povljane

Highway system
- Highways in Croatia

D108 is a state road branching off from D106 trunk road on the island of Pag and terminating in Povljane. The road is 7.6 km long.

The road, as well as all other state roads in Croatia, is managed and maintained by Hrvatske ceste, a state-owned company.

== Road junctions and populated areas ==
D108 junctions/populated areas
Type	Slip roads/Notes
	Gorica; D106 - connection to Pag and Posedarje. Northern terminus of the road.
	L63019 to Vlašići (via Ž6005)
	Povljane. Southern terminus of the road.
