= D107 road (Croatia) =

County road in Croatia

D107 state road

Route information
- Length: 8.0 km (5.0 mi)

Major junctions
- From: D106 near Novalja
- To: Stara Novalja ferry port

Location
- Country: Croatia
- Counties: Lika-Senj
- Major cities: Stara Novalja

Highway system
- Highways in Croatia

D107 is a state road of Croatia, branching off from D106 trunk road on the island of Pag and terminating in Stara Novalja ferry port. The road is 8.0 km long.

The road, as well as all other state roads in Croatia, is managed and maintained by Hrvatske ceste, a state-owned company.

== Road junctions and populated areas ==
Destinations	Notes	
	D106 - connection to Novalja and Žigljen ferry port.	Southern terminus of the road.
	Stara Novalja	
	Stara Novalja ferry port.	Northern terminus of the road.
