= Damir Mišković =

Croatian businessman and entrepreneur

Chairman of HNK Rijeka
- Incumbent
- Assumed office 20 March 2012
- Preceded by: Robert Komen

Personal details
- Born: 20 March 1965 (age 61) Rijeka, SR Croatia, SFR Yugoslavia (modern Croatia)
- Spouse: Snježana Mišković
- Children: 2
- Parent(s): Šime Mišković (father); Anna Mišković (mother)
- Education: University of Rijeka
- Occupation: Businessman, football executive
- Known for: Chairman and owner of HNK Rijeka

Damir Mišković (pronounced [ˈdamiːr ˈmiʃkoʋitɕ]; born 20 March 1965) is a Croatian businessman and football executive. He is the chairman and owner of Croatian Football League club HNK Rijeka, a position he has held since 2012.

== Early life and education ==
Mišković was born in Rijeka in the former Socialist Republic of Croatia, then part of Yugoslavia. His family originates from the village of Miškovići on the island of Pag, which his grandfather left after the Second World War and moved to Rijeka, where he found employment at the city's port. Damir's father, Šime, grew up in the old part of Rijeka, where he met his future wife and Damir's mother, Anna, who worked at a footwear store "Beograd".

Mišković attended and graduated from the Maritime School in Rijeka. In his youth, he played football as a goalkeeper for several local clubs, including Orijent, Pomorac Kostrena and Grobničan.

Due to his work obligations Mišković spends most of his time in Dubai, London, and Africa.

== Business career ==
After completing the maritime high school, Mišković moved to Norway where he worked at a port and was responsible for controlling the loading and unloading of goods. He continued his career in West Africa, where he initially worked in the port town of Warri in Nigeria for Orlean Invest Holding - a leading logistics corporation in the oil and gas industry. Despite facing difficult working conditions, Mišković soon became the youngest general manager in the company and, through the years, rose to be the executive director.

On 20 March 2012, Mišković rescued Croatian football club Rijeka from debt and threatening collapse, becoming the club's owner and chairman. HNK Rijeka is his hometown club which he has a big fan of from his earliest days. Over the next several years, he transformed the club into a title contender, recording great results both domestically and in Europe. Over the years, Mišković has invested more than 50 million euros into the club and associated infrastructure, which included the construction of a new training camp and a new club stadium named Rujevica. Since Mišković took ownership and puzzled together the management team which still leads the club as of 2025, HNK Rijeka has won a total of seven domestic trophies, becoming champions of the Croatian Football League twice (in 2017 and 2025), and winners of the Croatian Football Cup five times - in 2014, 2017 (with which they secured their first domestic double), 2019, 2020, and 2025 (club's second domestic double).
