= D406 road =

Road in Croatia

D406 state road

Route information
- Length: 2.9 km (1.8 mi)

Major junctions
- From: D8 near Prizna
- To: Prizna ferry port

Location
- Country: Croatia
- Counties: Lika-Senj

Highway system
- Highways in Croatia

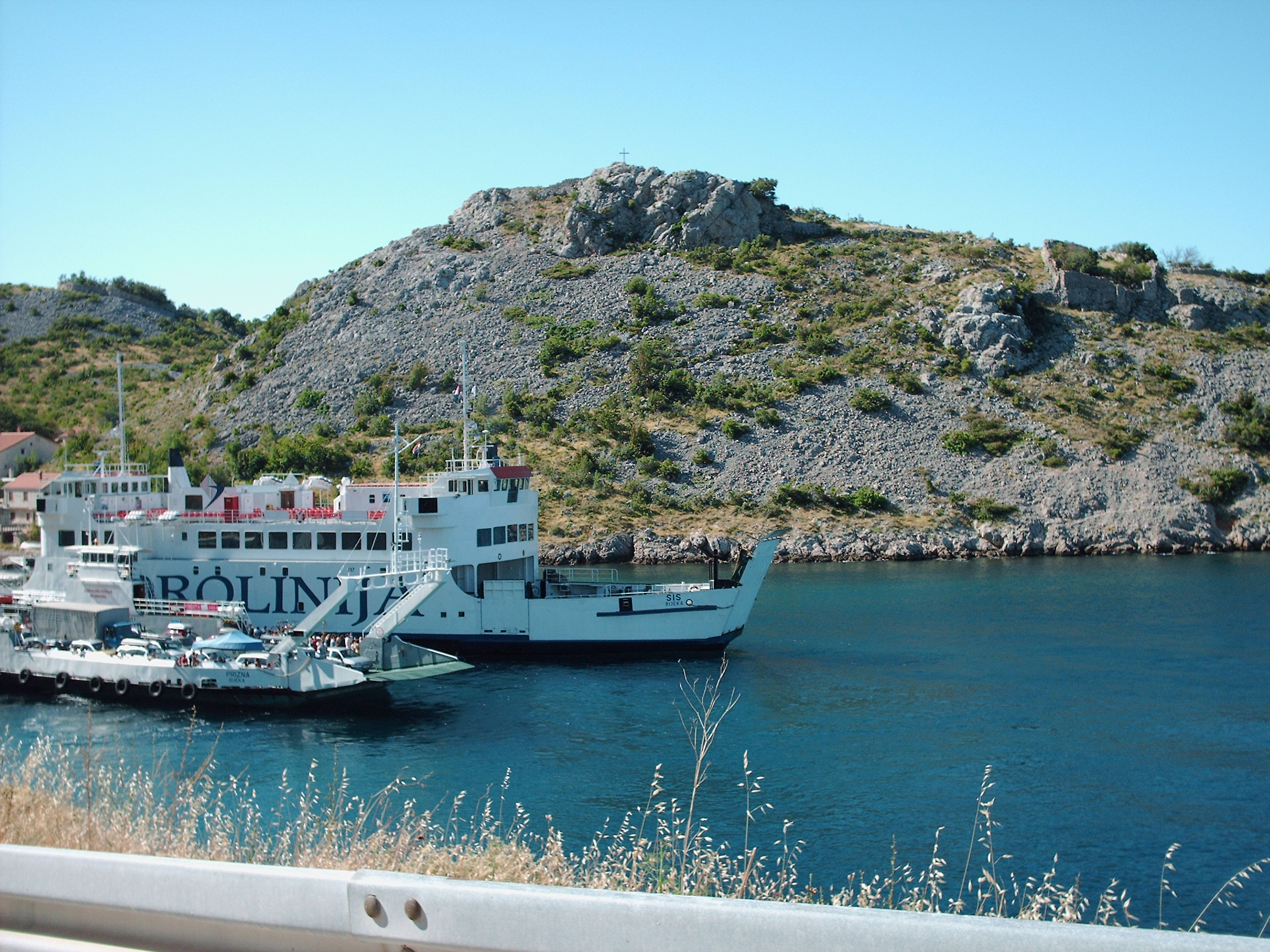
Prizna-Žigljen ferry, connecting the D106 and the D406 roads

D406 branches off to the southwest from D8 near Prizna towards Prizna ferry port - ferry access to Žigljen, island of Pag (D106). The road is 2.9 km long.

As with all other state roads in Croatia, the D406 is also managed and maintained by Hrvatske ceste, state owned company.

== Traffic volume ==
Traffic is not regularly counted on the road, however, Hrvatske ceste report number of vehicles using Prizna-Žigljen ferry line, connecting D406 to the D106 state road. Substantial variations between annual (AADT) and summer (ASDT) traffic volumes are attributed to the fact that the road connects to a number of summer resorts.

D406 traffic volume
Road	Counting site	AADT	ASDT	Notes
D406	335 Prizna-Žigljen	816	2,601	Vehicles using Prizna-Žigljen ferry line.

== Road junctions and populated areas ==
D406 junctions/populated areas
Type	Slip roads/Notes
	D8 to Rijeka (to the north) and Zadar (to the south). Northern terminus of the road.
	Prizna
	Prizna ferry port - ferry access to Žigljen, island of Pag (D106). Southern terminus of the road.
