= Bošana, Croatia =

Village in Zadar County, Croatia

Bošana Bossana
- Village
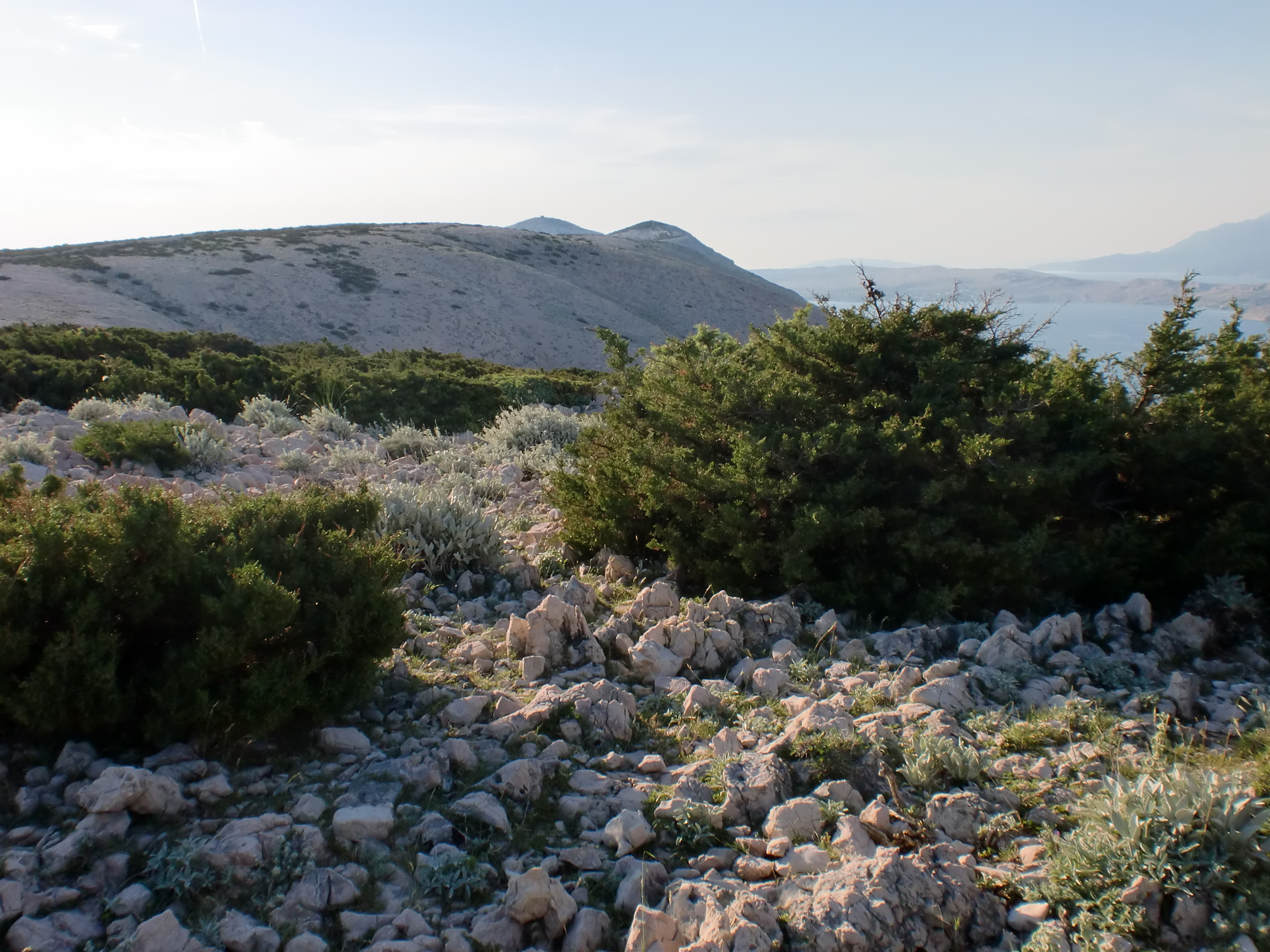
- Landscape near Bošana

- Location within Croatia
- Coordinates: 44.46620°N 15.01632°E
- Country: Croatia
- County: Zadar County
- Town: Pag

Area
  - Total: 0.7 km^{2} (0.27 sq mi)

Population (2021)
  - Total: 29
  - Density: 41/km^{2} (110/sq mi)
- Time zone: UTC+1 (CET)
  - Summer (DST): UTC+2 (CEST)
- Postal code: 23250
- Area code: 023
- Vehicle registration: ZD

Bošana (Italian: Bossana) is a village on the Croatian island of Pag, in Zadar County. Administratively, it is part of the town of Pag. As of 2021, it had a population of 29. The village overlooks Pag Bay.
