= D108 =

D108 may refer to:

- D108 road (Croatia), a state road branching off from D106 trunk road on the island of Pag and terminating in Povljane
- HMS Cardiff (D108), a British Type 42 destroyer and the third ship of the Royal Navy
- HMS Dainty (D108), a Daring class destroyer of the British Royal Navy
