= Dinjiška =

- Village
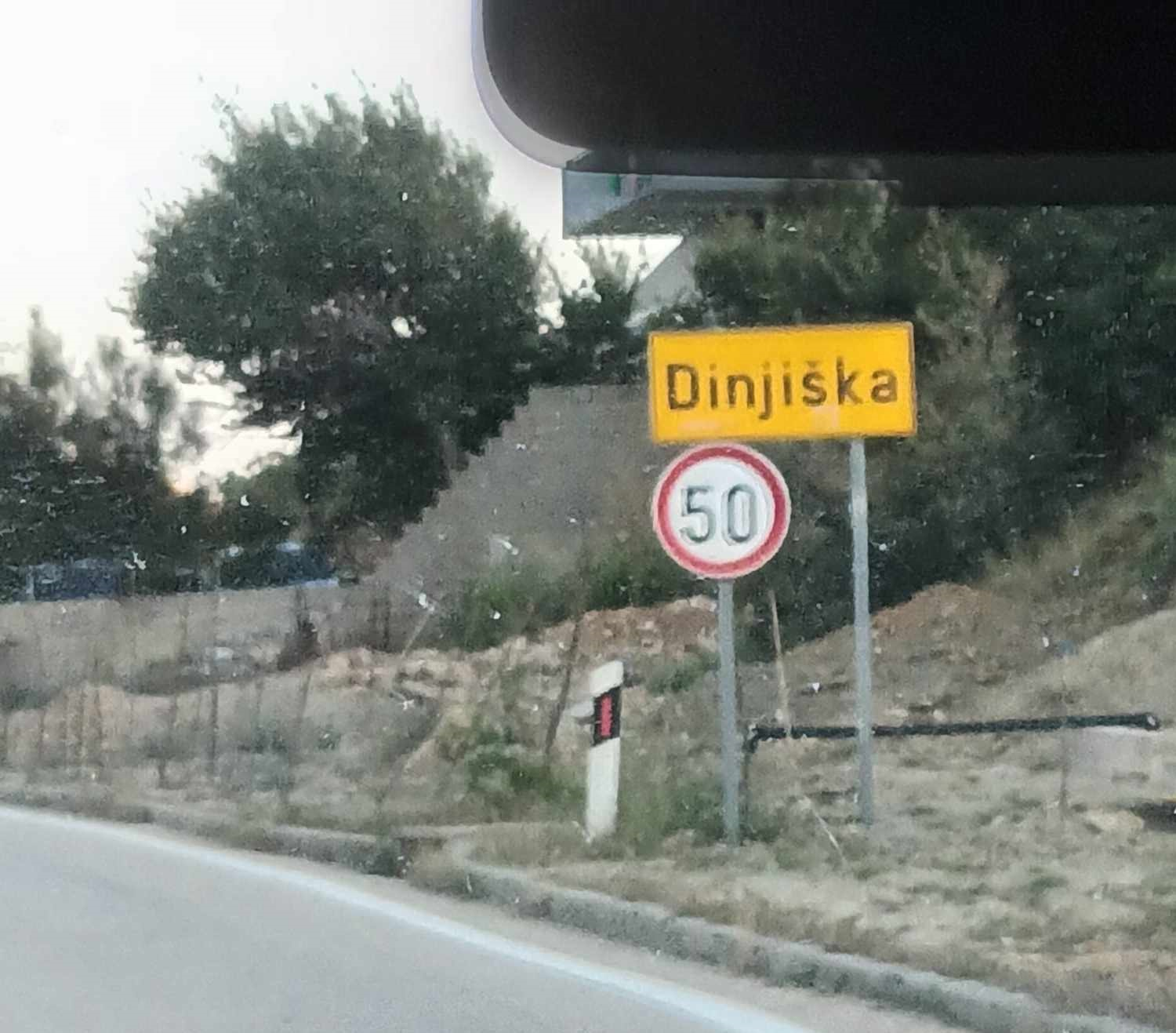

- Location within Croatia
- Coordinates: 44°22′N 15°11′E
- Country: Croatia
- County: Zadar County
- Town: Pag

Area
  - Total: 10.0 km^{2} (3.9 sq mi)

Population (2021)
  - Total: 111
  - Density: 11.1/km^{2} (28.7/sq mi)
- Time zone: UTC+1 (CET)
  - Summer (DST): UTC+2 (CEST)

Dinjiška is a village on the Croatian island of Pag, in Zadar County. Administratively, it is part of the town of Pag. As of 2021, it had a population of 111. It is connected by the D106 highway.

In Dinjiška, there used to be a working saltworks, built during the French administration. In the center of the town is the church of St. Maura, thoroughly rebuilt in the 16th century.
