= Šimuni =

Village in Zadar County, Croatia

Šimuni San Simone di Pago
- Village
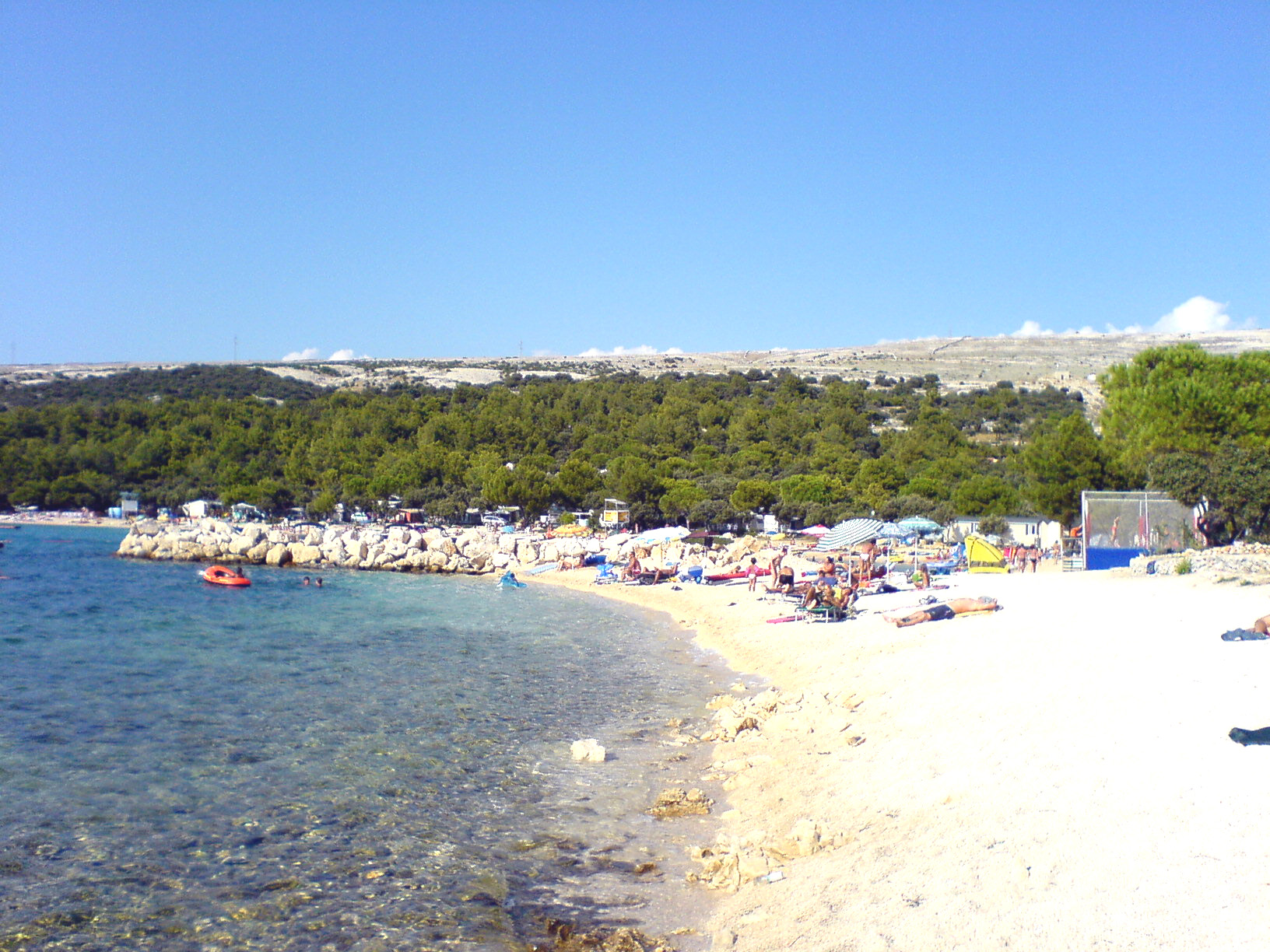
- Beach in Šimuni

- Location within Croatia
- Coordinates: 44.46919°N 14.95871°E
- Country: Croatia
- County: Zadar County
- Town: Pag

Area
  - Total: 3.4 km^{2} (1.3 sq mi)

Population (2021)
  - Total: 164
  - Density: 48/km^{2} (120/sq mi)
- Time zone: UTC+1 (CET)
  - Summer (DST): UTC+2 (CEST)
- Postal code: 23251
- Area code: 023
- Vehicle registration: ZD

Šimuni (Italian: San Simone di Pago) is a coastal village on the Croatian island of Pag, in Zadar County. Administratively, it is part of the town of Pag. As of 2021, it had a population of 164.
