= Vrčići =

Village in Zadar County, Croatia

Vrčići Vercici
- Village
- Location within Croatia
- Coordinates: 44.38584°N 15.14358°E
- Country: Croatia
- County: Zadar County
- Town: Pag

Area
  - Total: 9.8 km^{2} (3.8 sq mi)

Population (2021)
  - Total: 27
  - Density: 2.8/km^{2} (7.1/sq mi)
- Time zone: UTC+1 (CET)
  - Summer (DST): UTC+2 (CEST)
- Postal code: 23249
- Area code: 023
- Vehicle registration: ZD

Vrčići (Italian: Vercici) is a village on the Croatian island of Pag, in Zadar County. Administratively, it is part of the town of Pag. As of 2021, it had a population of 27.
