= Veliko Blato =

Veliko Blato may refer to:

- Veliko Blato (Serbia), a lake near the Danube north of Belgrade
- Veliko Blato (Croatia), a wetland on the island of Pag
