= Košljun =

Košljun may refer to:

- Košljun (island), located near Krk, Croatia
- Košljun, Pag, a village on the island of Pag, Croatia
