= Pag Triangle =

Land formation on the Croatian island of Pag

Coordinates: 44.56255751°N 14.91909027°E

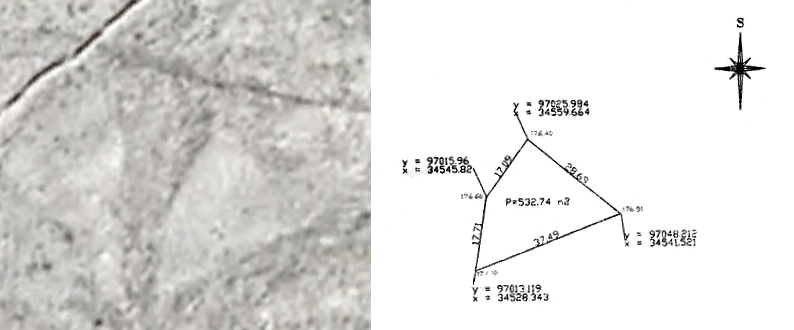
image from airplane and drawing

Pag triangle (Croatian: Paški trokut) is a pareidolia and land formation in the shape of an irregular quadrilateral located near the village Caska, adjacent to Novalja on the Croatian island Pag. It has been designated a natural landmark by the town of Novalja. It is often referred to as the Bermuda triangle of Croatia.

The formation was noted on the 9th of May 1999 by Zdenko Grbavac, a surveyor taking measurements for a quarry.

In ten years since its discovery, media sensationalism turned it into an urban myth and claims have been made of over 500,000 tourist visitors.

Croatian ufologists have linked the existence of the formation to a series of UFO sightings in the late 20th century over the island of Pag.

In early 2009, a road was built connecting the triangle to the nearby village of Caska, thus making it more accessible to visitors. Many visitors have taken rocks as souvenirs or charms due to unsubstantiated claims about their healing powers, which have left the area with holes. Others have repositioned some rocks, creating petroforms.

The formation is one of many polygonal shapes on the broken karst terrain. There are no scientifically proven geological or geochemical differences compared to the rest of the area.
