= Miškovići =

Village in Zadar County, Croatia

Miškovići Miskovici
- Village
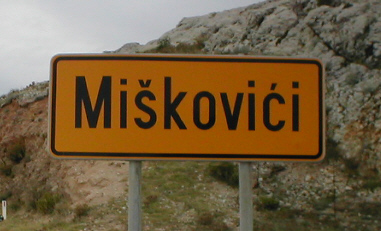
- Entrance to Miškovići

- Location within Croatia
- Coordinates: 44.33729°N 15.22811°E
- Country: Croatia
- County: Zadar County
- Town: Pag

Area
  - Total: 9.0 km^{2} (3.5 sq mi)

Population (2021)
  - Total: 55
  - Density: 6.1/km^{2} (16/sq mi)
- Time zone: UTC+1 (CET)
  - Summer (DST): UTC+2 (CEST)
- Postal code: 23250
- Area code: 023
- Vehicle registration: ZD

Miškovići (Italian: Miskovici) is a village on the Croatian island of Pag. Administratively, it is part of the town of Pag. As of 2021, it had a population of 55.
