= Veliko Blato (Croatia) =

Protected area in Croatia

Coordinates: 44.35823°N 15.1469°E

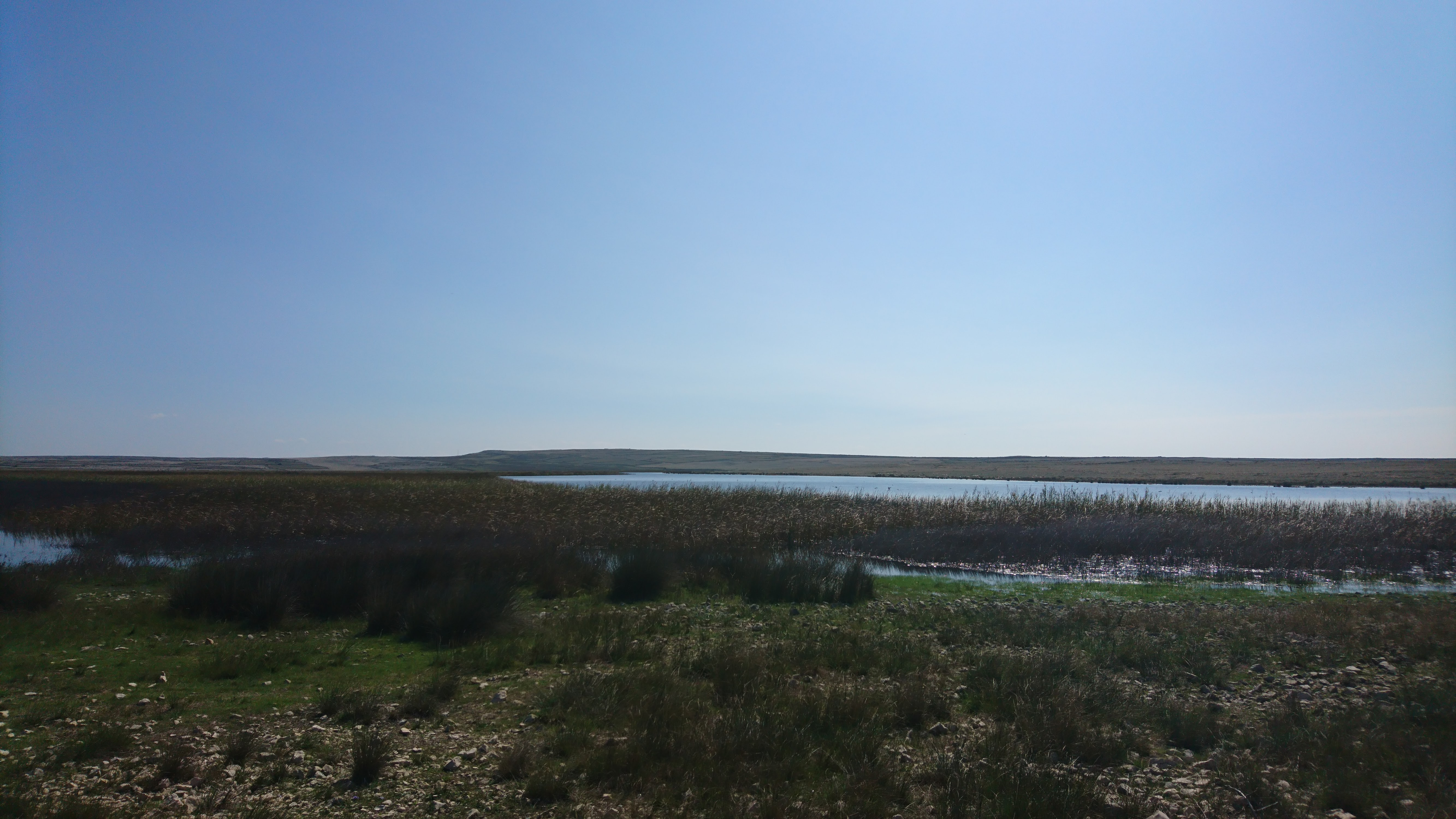
- Interactive map of Veliko Blato
- Established: 1988

Veliko Blato is an ornithological reserve on the Croatian island of Pag.

== Description ==
The reserve has a length of about 2 km and an average width of 1.2 km. It forms a shelter for a wide variety of marsh birds, especially during the nesting, migration and hibernation period.

== Flora ==
The northern part of the reserve is surrounded by reeds, mainly Phragmites, which are especially well-developed in the southeastern part of the reserve. Besides reeds, there are some varieties of sedges like Carex species, rushes including Juncus acutus, Juncus conglomeratus and Juncus maritimus and other marsh varieties like Scirpus species and Sparganium erectum. The edge of the lake is covered with meadows which are sometimes flooded in spring and fall. The southern part of the reserve is surrounded by karst terrain covered with karst plants like Euphorbia spinosa, Helichrysum italicum, Salvia officinalis, Inula candida and Stachis salviaefolius.

== Fauna ==
Many birds visit the reserve throughout the year. Some of the visiting species are the Eurasian coot, little grebe, great crested grebe, grey heron, great egret, bittern, glossy ibis, ferruginous duck and the common spoonbill. Many species also nest in the area. These species include the gadwall, Montagu's harrier, and the calandra lark. Other animals present in the reserve include the Italian wall lizard.

== Tourism ==
The reserve is an important bird-watching location and has a watch tower and an infoboard. Tickets for sightseeing in the Veliko Blato reserve are sold by the tourist board in Povljana.
