= Košljun, Pag =

Village in Zadar County, Croatia

Košljun Cassione
- Village
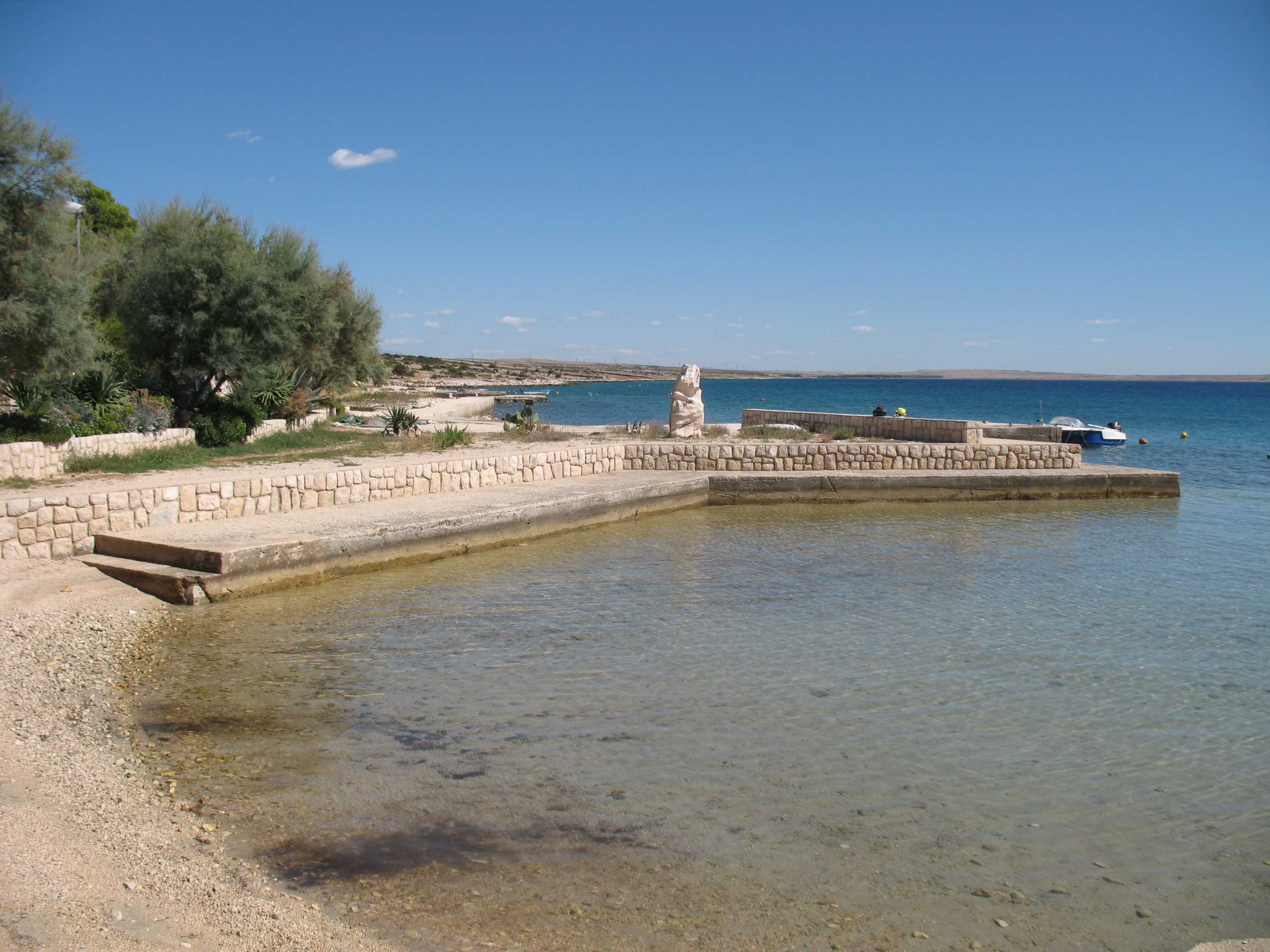
- Košljun beach

- Location within Croatia
- Coordinates: 44.39873°N 15.07899°E
- Country: Croatia
- County: Zadar County
- Town: Pag

Area
  - Total: 7.0 km^{2} (2.7 sq mi)

Population (2021)
  - Total: 68
  - Density: 9.7/km^{2} (25/sq mi)
- Time zone: UTC+1 (CET)
  - Summer (DST): UTC+2 (CEST)
- Postal code: 23250
- Area code: 023
- Vehicle registration: ZD

Košljun (Italian: Cassione) is a small coastal village on the Croatian island of Pag, in Zadar County. Administratively, it is part of the town of Pag. As of 2021, it had a population of 68.

== Bibliography ==
=== Biology ===
- Šašić, Martina; Nahirnić, Ana; Tarmann, Gerhard M. (2016-12-31). "Zygaenidae (Lepidoptera) in the Lepidoptera collections of the Croatian Natural History Museum". Natura Croatica: Periodicum Musei Historiae Naturalis Croatici. 25 (2): 233–248. doi:10.20302/NC.2016.25.19. eISSN 1848-7386.
