= Pag Bridge =

Pag Bridge Paški most
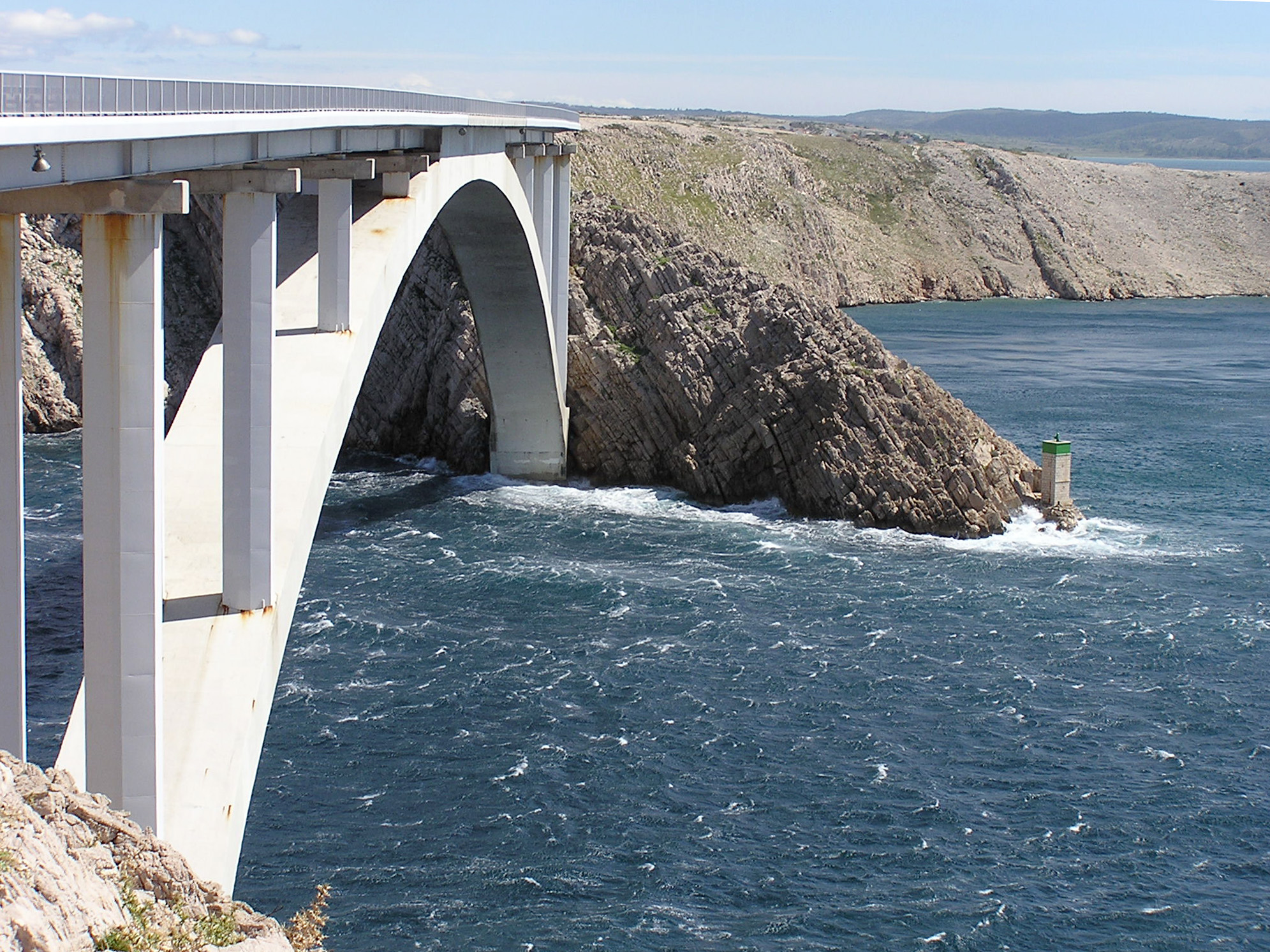
- Coordinates: 44.325°N 15.258°E
- Carries: D106 road
- Crosses: Ljubačka Vrata Strait
- Locale: Zadar County, Croatia
- Named for: Island of Pag
- Maintained by: Hrvatske ceste

Characteristics
- Design: concrete arch bridge
- Total length: 301 m
- Width: 9 m
- Longest span: 201 m
- Clearance below: 35 m

History
- Opened: 1968

Location
- Interactive map of Pag Bridge

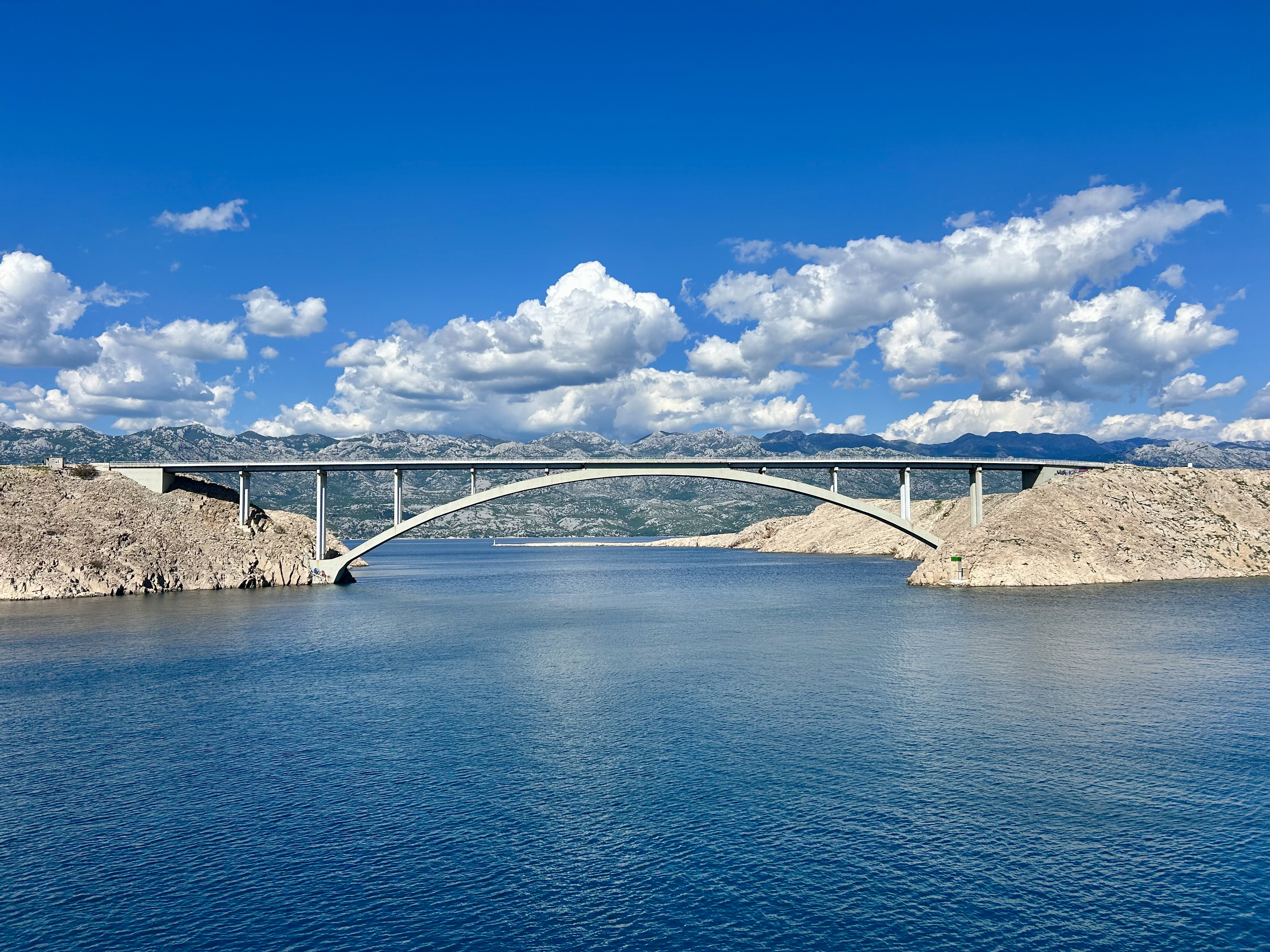
Paški most

The Pag Bridge (Croatian: Paški most) is the bridge that connects the island of Pag to the Croatian mainland. It is a 301 meters (988 ft) long, 9 meters (30 ft) wide bridge whose 201 meters (659 ft) long arch rises 35 meters (115 ft) above an Adriatic Sea strait called Ljubačka Vrata. It was opened on 17 November 1968, and it transformed life on the island of Pag to be able to function more as a peninsula.

The bridge was built by the local company Mostogradnja, designed by civil engineer Ilija Stojadinović, who also designed the nearby Šibenik Bridge. The location of the bridge near Velebit causes the bridge to endure strong gusts of wind, the bora, and during the construction the wind speed was 8 on the Beaufort scale for a period of four months. In a 2019 spring storm, the top wind speed on the bridge was 198 kilometres per hour (123 mph).

== Sources ==
- Festini, Alenka (7 February 2008). "Paški most slavi 40. rođendan". Zadarski list (in Croatian).
- "Nevrijeme u Hrvatskoj od 12. do 14. svibnja 2019" (in Croatian). Croatian Meteorological and Hydrological Service. 14 May 2019.
