= Vlašići =

Village in Zadar County, Croatia

Vlašići Valassichi
- Village
- Location within Croatia
- Coordinates: 44.32569°N 15.20716°E
- Country: Croatia
- County: Zadar County
- Town: Pag

Area
  - Total: 9.7 km^{2} (3.7 sq mi)

Population (2021)
  - Total: 212
  - Density: 22/km^{2} (57/sq mi)
- Time zone: UTC+1 (CET)
  - Summer (DST): UTC+2 (CEST)
- Postal code: 23249
- Area code: 023
- Vehicle registration: ZD

Vlašići (Italian: Valassichi, German: Walassigy) is a village on the Croatian island of Pag. Administratively, it is part of the town of Pag. As of 2021, it had a population of 212.
