= Gorica, Pag =

Village in Zadar County, Croatia

Gorica Valsaline
- Village
- Location within Croatia
- Coordinates: 44.39755°N 15.11904°E
- Country: Croatia
- County: Zadar County
- Town: Pag

Area
  - Total: 8.2 km^{2} (3.2 sq mi)

Population (2021)
  - Total: 87
  - Density: 11/km^{2} (27/sq mi)
- Time zone: UTC+1 (CET)
  - Summer (DST): UTC+2 (CEST)
- Postal code: 23250
- Area code: 023
- Vehicle registration: ZD

Gorica (Croatian pronunciation: [ɡɔrìːt͡sa], Italian: Valsaline) is a small village on the Croatian island of Pag, in Zadar County. Administratively, it is part of the town of Pag. As of 2021, it had a population of 87.
