= Pag lace =

Form of lacework

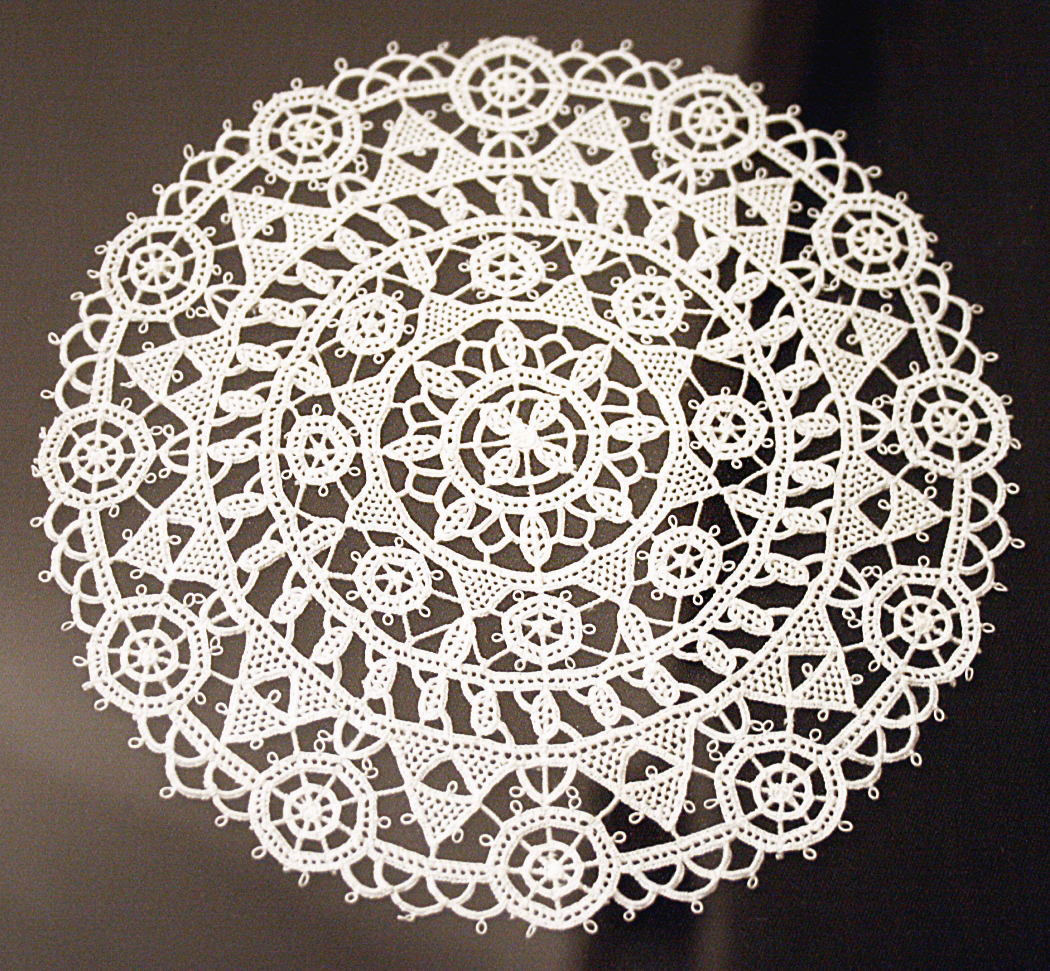
- Type: Lace
- Production method: Needle lace
- Production process: Handicraft
- Place of origin: Pag, Croatia
- Introduced: 15th century

Lacemaking in Croatia
- UNESCO Intangible Cultural Heritage
- Country: Croatia
- Reference: 00245
- Region: Europe and North America

Inscription history
- Inscription: 2009 (4th session)
- List: Representative

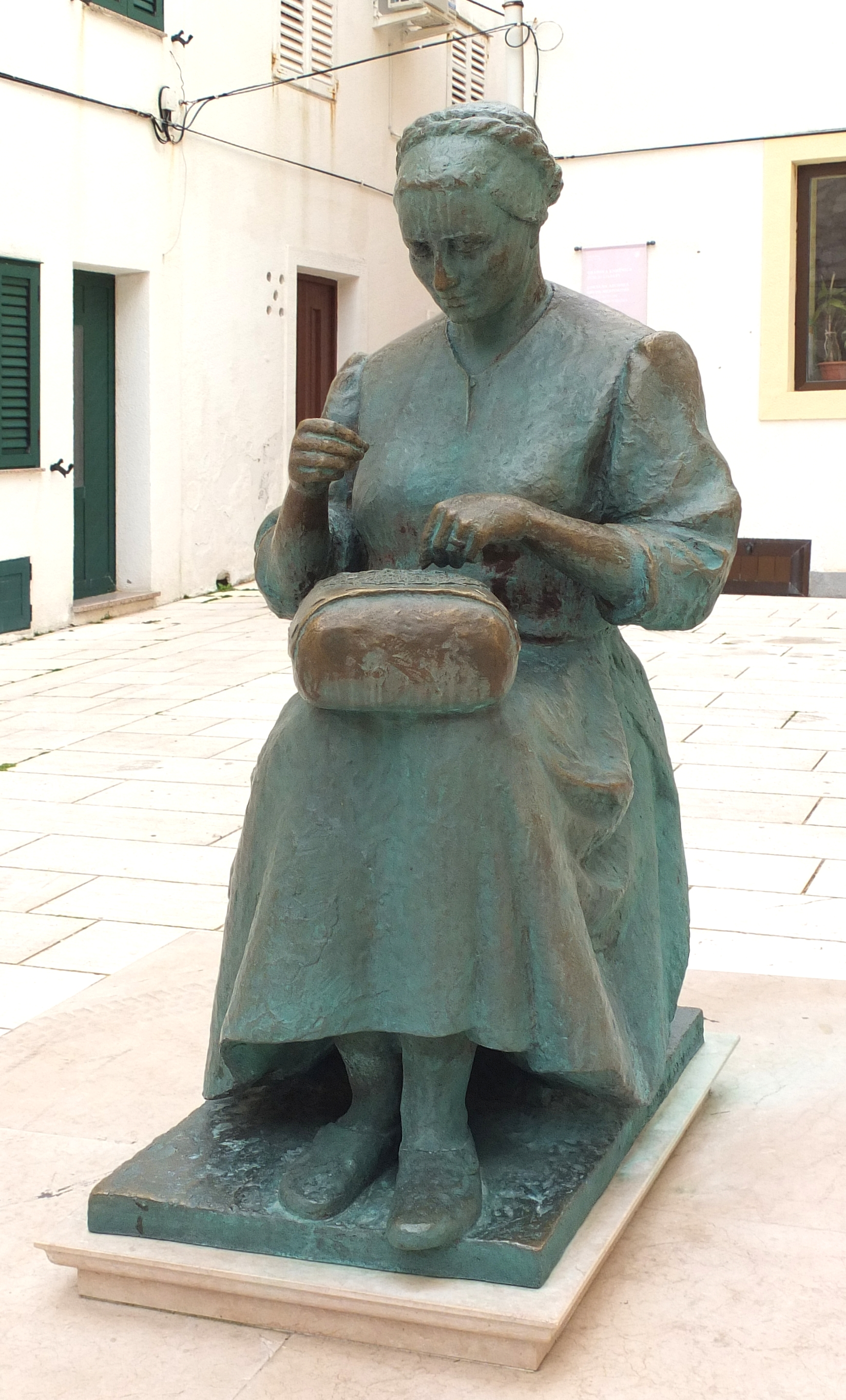
Bronze statue of a Pag lace-maker, Pag (town)

Pag lace (Croatian: Paška čipka) is a distinct form of lacework originating from Pag, an island in Croatia. Creating Pag lace involves using a needle, thread, and a firm round or square pillow as a backing.

Traditionally, lace-makers of Pag did their teg (work) without any drawings. Each woman would inherit works from her mother and grandmothers, incorporating their techniques while adding a personal touch, resulting in unique and exceptional pieces. The creation of each lacework symbolizes the anonymous, modest, and self-sacrificing lives of the skilled artisans.

In 2009, Lacemaking in Croatia, represented by Lepoglava lace, Pag lace and Hvar lace, was inscribed in the UNESCO's Representative List of the Intangible Cultural Heritage of Humanity.

== History ==
Pag lace is notable for its unique origins, believed to trace back to Mycenae, and has been preserved in the city of Pag since ancient times. The earliest documented records of Pag lace date back to the 15th century, mentioning the involvement of the Benedictine nuns from the monastery. Before, there were no stencils or blueprints for making, the work being entirely empirical. The way they were made and their pattern was passed from generation to generation, from mother to daughter by word of mouth and practical work. Benedictine Monastery of St. Margaritas is also responsible for spreading Pag lace, which they sold to Venice or Vienna. The Benedictine sisters were the main initiators of lacemaking and the lace school in Pag. Today, the monastery has a collection of over a hundred exhibits that has been preserved and collected for over 150 years.

For the first time that Pag lace was officially presented at the exhibition in 1880. In the period from 1906 to 1943, Pag lace was shown at numerous exhibitions around the world, in London, New York, Budapest, Belgrade, Vienna, Milan, Prague. At the World's Fair in Paris in 1937, it received a gold plaque as an extremely valuable handiwork. Empress Maria Theresa kept a Pag lacemaker at the Viennese court, who sewed lace for the needs of the court.

== See also ==
- Lacemaking in Croatia
