= Stara Novalja =

Village in Lika-Senj County, Croatia

- Village
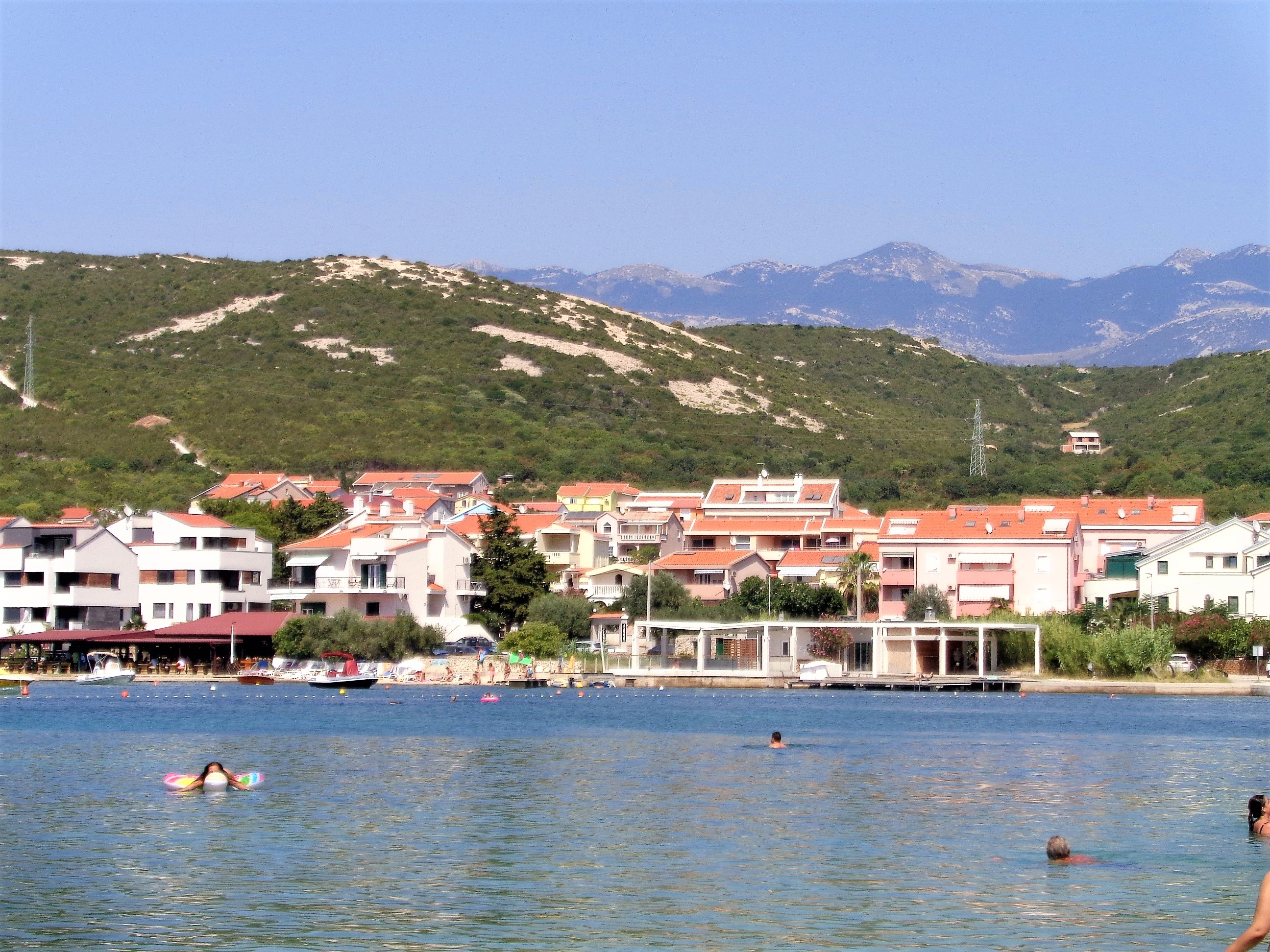
- View of Stara Novalja

- Location within Croatia
- Coordinates: 44.59668°N 14.87592°E
- Country: Croatia
- County: Lika-Senj
- Town: Novalja

Area
  - Total: 11.4 km^{2} (4.4 sq mi)

Population (2021)
  - Total: 281
  - Density: 24.6/km^{2} (63.8/sq mi)
- Time zone: UTC+1 (CET)
  - Summer (DST): UTC+2 (CEST)
- Postal code: 53 291

Stara Novalja is a village in the cove of the same name in the north-eastern part of the island of Pag, 5 kilometers north of Novalja in Croatia. The economy is based on farming, viniculture, fishing and tourism.

The cove of Stara Novalja is the submerged part of the "Pasko-Dinjiska" valley. The safest dock for larger ships is located south of the cove called "Drljanda", where the depth reaches 27–38 meters. Smaller ships and yachts drawing up to 3.5 meters are docked along the external part of the jointed pier in front of the village.

Stara Novalja is located on the M29 road. In its vicinity are remains of antique walls, a late antique necropolis, and ruins of the pre-Romanesque church of the Holy Cross.

Since the ferry harbor was relocated to Žigljen (except in some extraordinary weather conditions), Stara Novalja has become a quiet place that offers accommodation facilities in private homes, as well as lodging and boarding services. As such it is preferred by families. The major event is the feast day of Saints Peter and Paul on 29 June.

== Beaches ==
The biggest beach in Stara Novalja is the sand beach, "Trincel". There are also many smaller beaches and jetties in front of the houses on the coastline.

== Climate ==
The climate in the village is mild and Mediterranean. Springs are lush and green, summers are dry and warm, falls pleasant and winters mild with the cold northeast bora winds sometimes blowing. Daily summer temperatures can reach 30 degrees and nights are pleasantly fresher. Summer sea temperatures reach 25 degrees, while the bathing season starts in May.

== Bibliography ==
=== Biology ===
- Šašić, Martina; Nahirnić, Ana; Tarmann, Gerhard M. (2016-12-31). "Zygaenidae (Lepidoptera) in the Lepidoptera collections of the Croatian Natural History Museum". Natura Croatica: Periodicum Musei Historiae Naturalis Croatici. 25 (2): 233–248. doi:10.20302/NC.2016.25.19. eISSN 1848-7386.
