= Prizna =

- Village
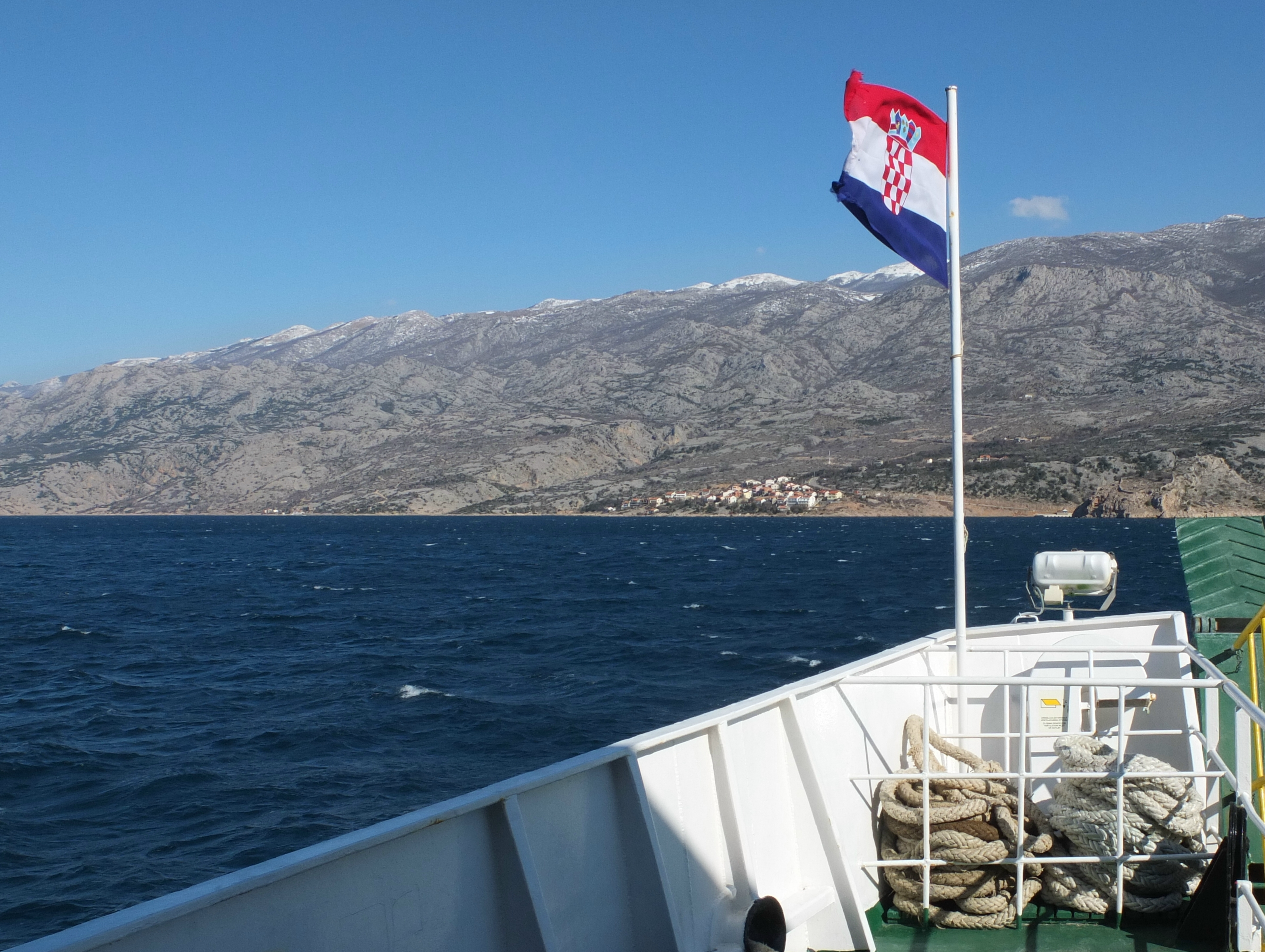
- Ferry between Prizna (mainland) and the Island of Pag, Prizna in the background

- Location within Croatia
- Coordinates: 44°36′07″N 14°58′13″E
- Country: Croatia

Area
  - Total: 63.8 km^{2} (24.6 sq mi)
- Elevation: 0 m (0 ft)

Population (2021)
  - Total: 27
  - Density: 0.42/km^{2} (1.1/sq mi)
- Time zone: UTC+1 (CET)
  - Summer (DST): UTC+2 (CEST)

Prizna is a port village in Croatia. It is connected by the D406 highway and by ferry.
