= Metajna =

Village in Lika-Senj County, Croatia

Metajna Mettaina
- Village
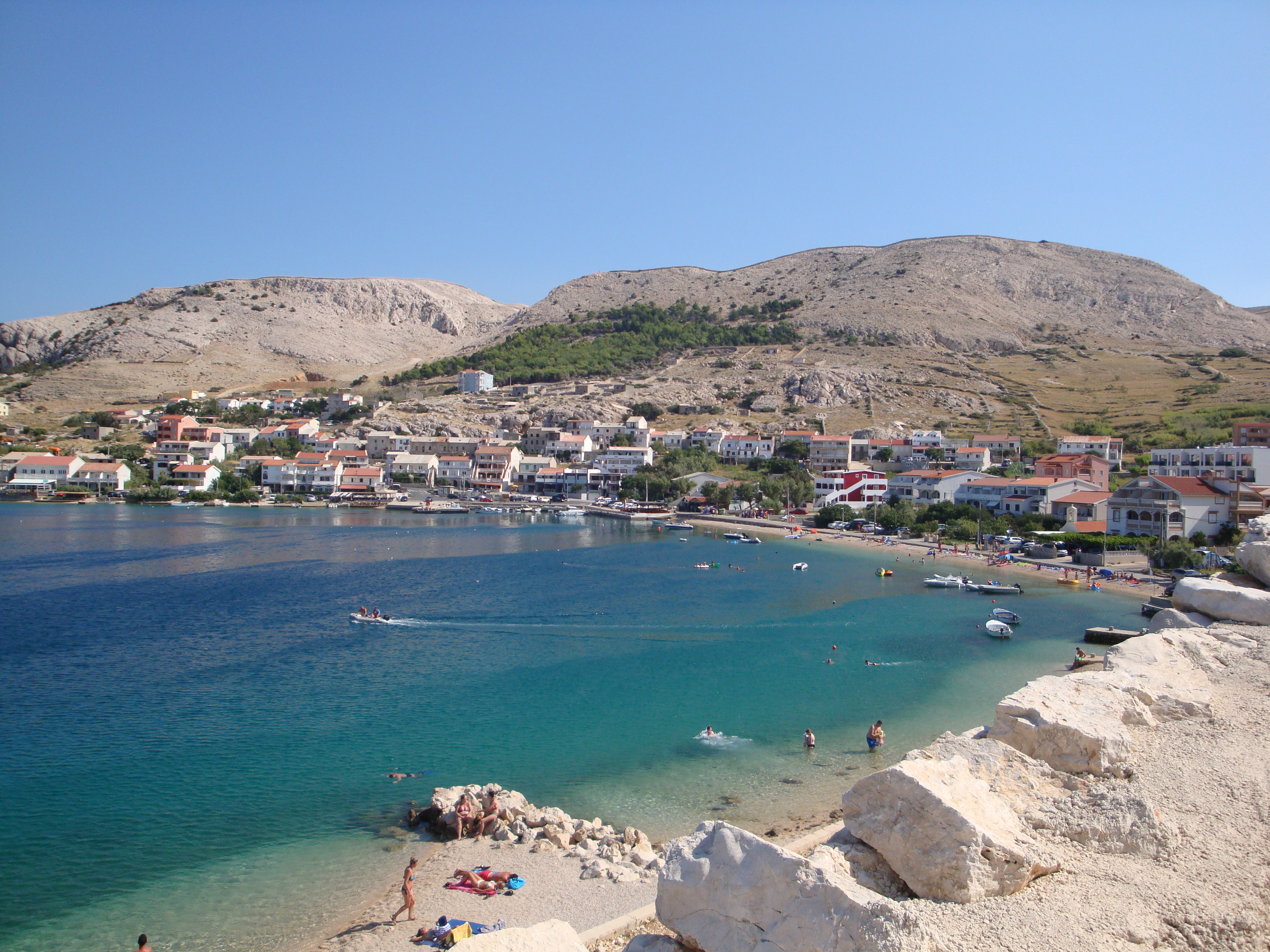
- View of Metajna

- Location within Croatia
- Coordinates: 44.50774°N 15.01091°E
- Country: Croatia
- County: Lika-Senj
- Town: Novalja

Area
  - Total: 9.7 km^{2} (3.7 sq mi)

Population (2021)
  - Total: 253
  - Density: 26/km^{2} (68/sq mi)
- Time zone: UTC+1 (CET)
  - Summer (DST): UTC+2 (CEST)
- Postal code: 53 291
- Vehicle registration: GS

Metajna (Italian: Mettaina) is a village on the Croatian island of Pag. Administratively, it is part of the town of Novalja. As of 2021, it had a population of 236. It is located on Pag Bay.
