= Povljana =

- Municipality
- Općina Povljana; Municipality of Povljana
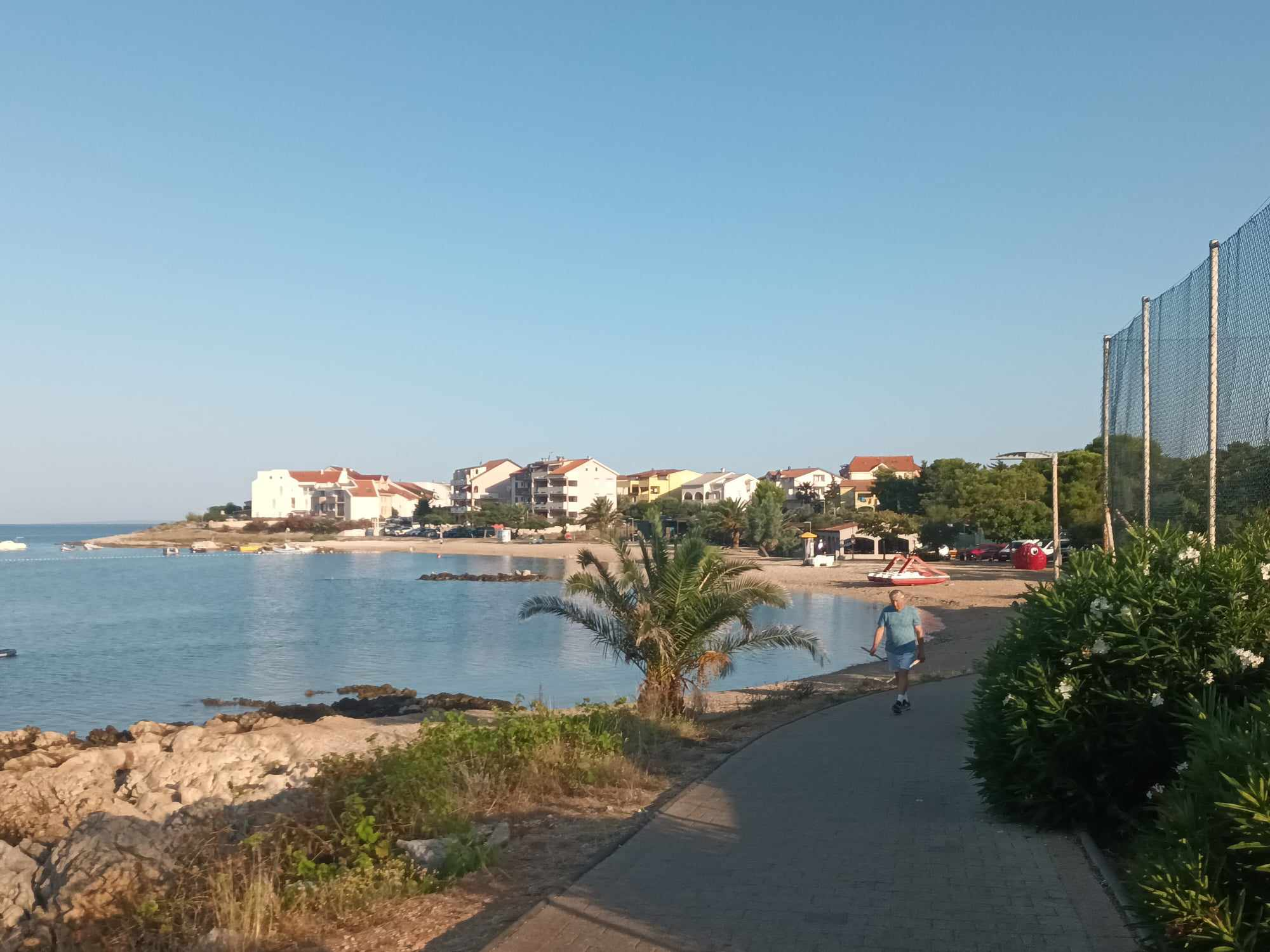
- Beach Mali Dubrovnik in Povljana

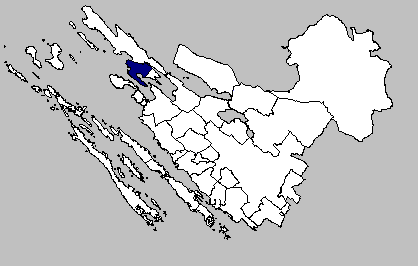
- Location of municipality within Zadar County
- Interactive map of Povljana
- Location of Povljane in Croatia
- Coordinates: 44°20′48.12″N 15°06′56.16″E
- Country: Croatia
- Region: Dalmatia
- County: Zadar County

Government
  - Municipal mayor: Ivica Pogorilić

Area
  - Municipality: 38.4 km^{2} (14.8 sq mi)
  - Urban: 38.4 km^{2} (14.8 sq mi)

Population (2021)
  - Municipality: 669
  - Density: 17.4/km^{2} (45.1/sq mi)
  - Urban: 669
  - Urban density: 17.4/km^{2} (45.1/sq mi)
- Time zone: UTC+1 (CET)
  - Summer (DST): UTC+2 (CEST)
- Postal code: 23294 Povljana
- Vehicle registration: ZD
- Website: povljana.hr

Povljana is a village and the only settlement in the eponymous municipality on the island of Pag, in Zadar County, Croatia. It is located 12 km southeast of town of Pag. The nearby shoreline has steep slopes and small cliffs.

The name of the place Povljana comes from the Latin word PAULINIANA with the Latin suffix -ANA, which is the Roman name Paulus. ''Old Povljana'' was mentioned for the first time in historical documents during the construction of the church of St. Martin on February 13, 1345.

== Demographics ==
According to the 2011 census, there were 759 inhabitants, 95% of whom were Croats.

Povljana: Population trends 1857–2021
v

population	132	322	207	185	176	236	236	405	635	698	746	693	655	678	713	759	669
	1857	1869	1880	1890	1900	1910	1921	1931	1948	1953	1961	1971	1981	1991	2001	2011	2021

Sources: Croatian Bureau of Statistics publications

== Politics ==
=== Minority councils and representatives ===
Directly elected minority councils and representatives are tasked with consulting tasks for the local or regional authorities in which they are advocating for minority rights and interests, integration into public life and participation in the management of local affairs. At the 2023 Croatian national minorities councils and representatives elections Albanians of Croatia fulfilled legal requirements to elect 10 members minority councils of the Municipality of Povljana but the elections were not held due to the absence of candidatures.

== Bibliography ==
=== Biology ===
- Šašić, Martina; Nahirnić, Ana; Tarmann, Gerhard M. (2016-12-31). "Zygaenidae (Lepidoptera) in the Lepidoptera collections of the Croatian Natural History Museum". Natura Croatica: Periodicum Musei Historiae Naturalis Croatici. 25 (2): 233–248. doi:10.20302/NC.2016.25.19. eISSN 1848-7386.
