= Žigljen =

Coordinates: 44°34′48″N 14°56′55″E

Žigljen is a port in Croatia. It is connected by the D106 highway and by ferry. Regular ferries run to the isle of Pag, in the Adriatic Sea.

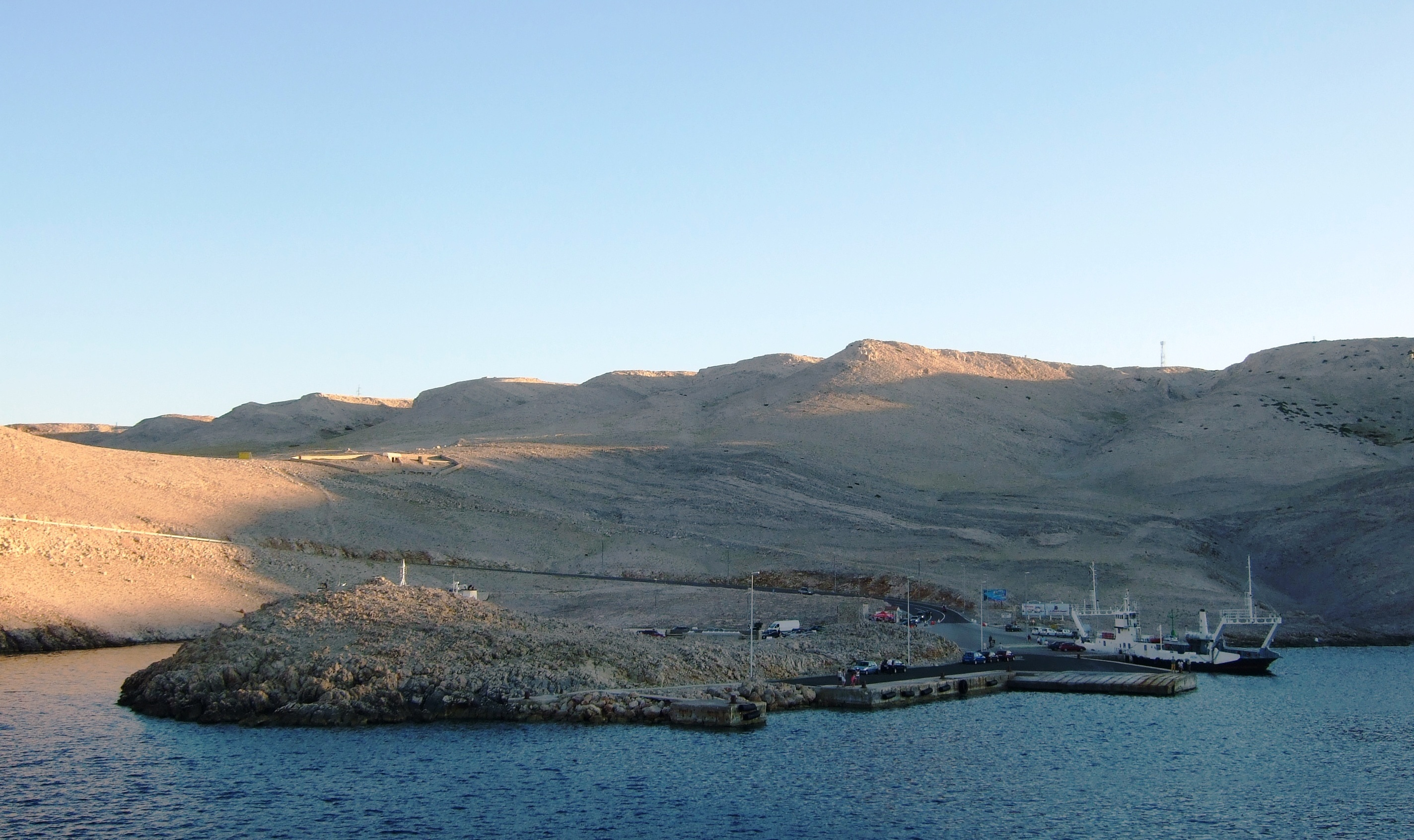
Žigljen port
