= Pag (island) =

Island of Croatia

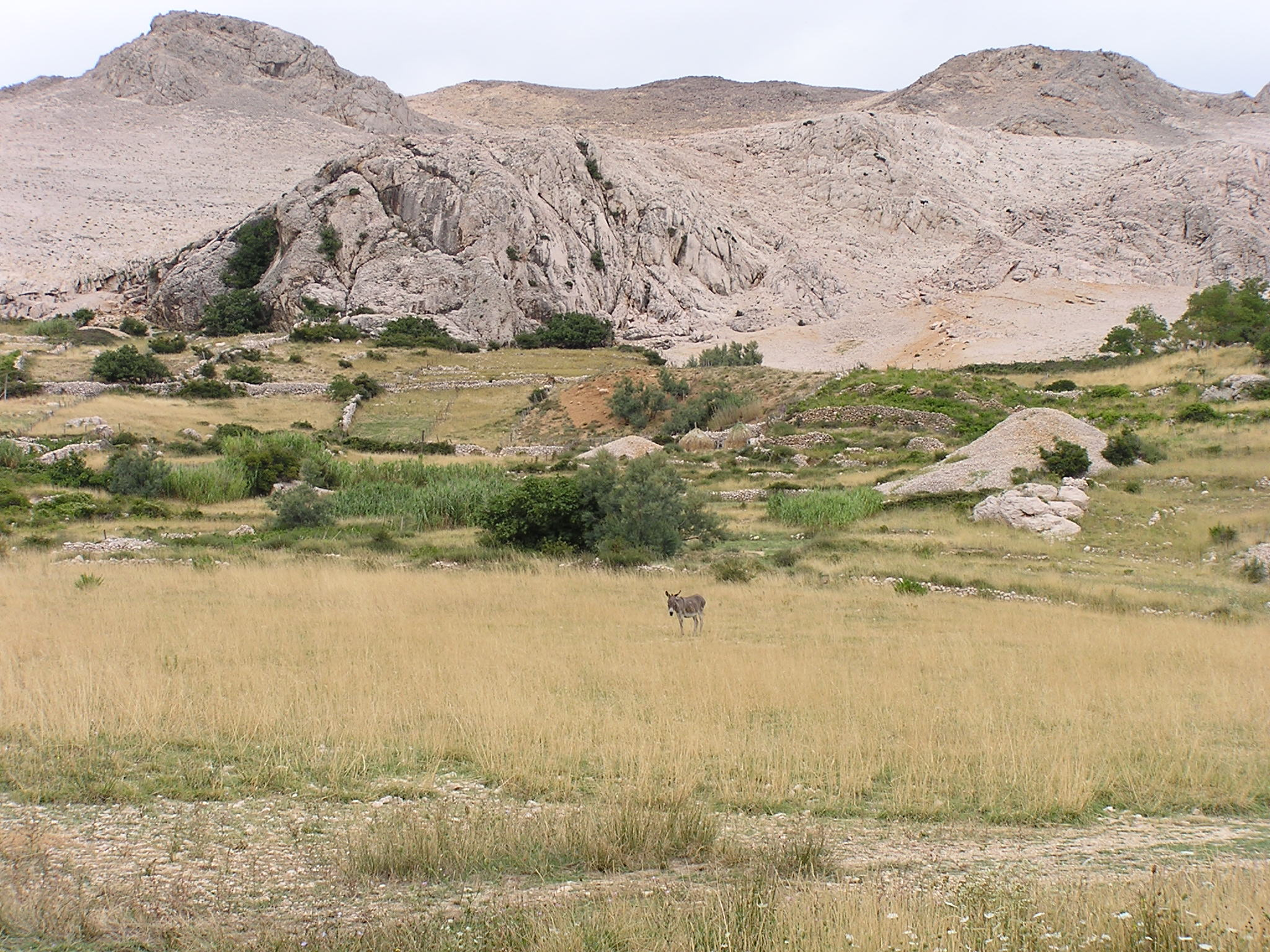
- Pag island landscape

- Location within Croatia
- Interactive map of Pag

Geography
- Location: Adriatic Sea
- Coordinates: 44°29′N 14°58′E
- Archipelago: north-Dalmatian
- Area: 284.56 km^{2} (109.87 sq mi)
- Length: 58.25 km (36.195 mi)
- Width: 2–10 km (1.2–6.2 mi)
- Coastline: 269.2 km (167.27 mi)
- Highest elevation: 349 m (1145 ft)
- Highest point: Sveti Vid

Administration
- Croatia
- County: Lika-Senj County; Zadar County
- Largest settlement: Pag (pop. 3,846)

Demographics
- Population: 9,059 (2011)
- Pop. density: 26.13/km^{2} (67.68/sq mi)

Pag (pronounced [pâːɡ]) is a Croatian island in the northern Adriatic Sea. It is the fifth-largest island of the Croatian coast and the one with the longest coastline.

In the 2011 census, the population of the island was 9,059. There are two towns on the island, Pag and Novalja, as well as many smaller villages and tourist places. Pag is the only Croatian island that is administratively divided between two counties. Its northern part belongs to Lika-Senj County, while the central and southern parts belong to Zadar County.

Due to its moon-like landscape, it is nicknamed "Moon Island".

== Geography ==
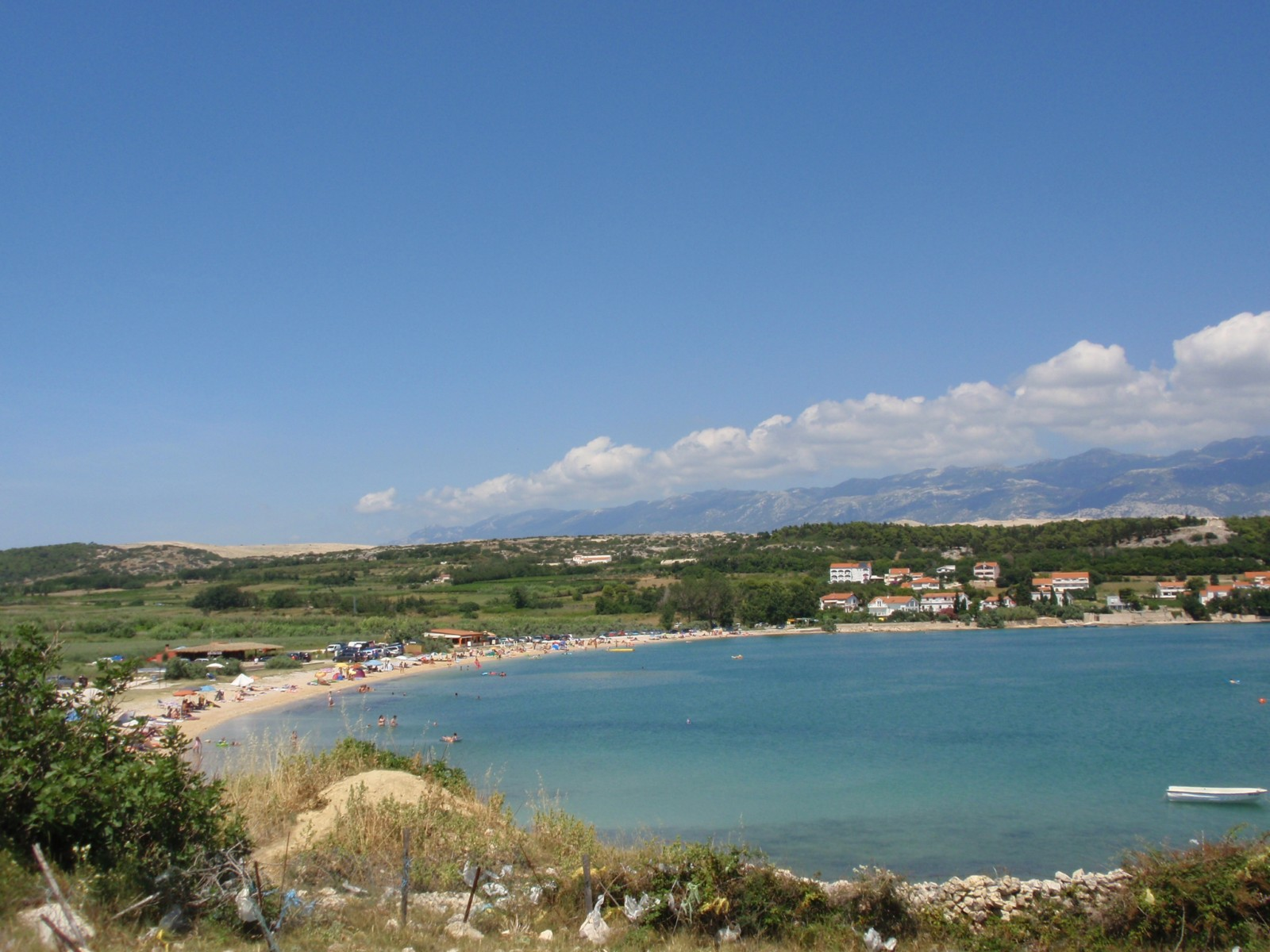
Beach and town at Caska on Pag

Pag is generally considered part of the northern Dalmatian islands and it extends northwest–southeast along the coast, separated from the mainland by the Velebit Channel. The island has an area of approximately 284.18 square kilometres (109.72 sq mi) and the coastline is 269.2 kilometres (167.27 mi). It is around 60 kilometres (37 miles) long (from northwest to southeast) and between 2 and 10 kilometres (1.2 and 6.2 miles) wide.

The island of Pag features a complex geological structure dominated by Cretaceous to Eocene shallow-water carbonates, deformed within the External Dinarides fold-and-thrust belt, and includes a more diverse lithology than most Dalmatian islands, with occurrences of breccias, sandstones, marls, and flysch sequences.

The southwestern coast of the island is low (including the Pag Bay with the large Caska cove), and the northwestern is steep and high (including Stara Novalja Bay). Most of the island is rocky; smaller areas are covered with Mediterranean shrubs. The southeast of the island contains karst lakes Velo Blato and Malo Blato. Sveti Vid, 348 m above sea level (St Vitus).

Grapes, vegetables, and fruit are grown in the valleys and fields. The northern area of the Lun peninsula is mostly under olive groves. Most communities on the island are connected by a road. A 300 m (980 ft)-long arch Pag Bridge connects the southern part of the island to the mainland. The Prizna–Žigljen ferry connects the northern part of the island to the mainland. The island has two municipalities with city status: Pag and Novalja, and many smaller villages and communities, including Lun, Stara Novalja, Gajac, Kolan, Metajna, Dinjiška, Povljana, and others. The island is administratively divided between Zadar County and Lika-Senj County, with Novalja, Stara Novalja, Lun, and Metajna being part of the northern Lika-Senj County, and the remainder of the island south of an isthmus at Gajac, including the town of Pag, being part of the southern Zadar County.

=== Important Bird Area ===
The island forms part of the Kvarner Islands Important Bird Area (IBA), designated as such by BirdLife International because it supports significant numbers of many bird species, including breeding populations of several birds of prey.

== History ==
The earliest settlers on the island were an Illyrian tribe that came to the region in the Bronze Age; traces of their settlement can still be seen around Pag. In the 1st century BC, the Romans took possession, and have left numerous archeological and cultural artifacts.

The Croats arrived in the 7th century along with the great migration and settled in the area. The island was for some time under the rule of the Croatian kingdom. Yet the island was always fought over, and in the 11th and 12th centuries was divided between the communities of Rab (Arbe) and Zadar (Zara).

From the 12th to 14th centuries, Pag, along with other Dalmatian islands and towns, was fiercely contested between the Republic of Venice and the Croatian-Hungarian rulers. For four centuries from the start of the 15th century, it was held by Venice, until Venice lost its independence in 1797. Austria and France then fought over Dalmatia with victory going to the Austrians.

The island passed from Austria-Hungary to the Kingdom of Yugoslavia after World War I, and then to the Independent State of Croatia (1941–45) when the Ustashe set up concentration camps at Slana and Metajna, where they killed thousands of Serbs, Jews, and Croatian anti-fascists.

On 10 April 1944, the Kotar Committee of the Communist Party of Senj (Croatian: Kotarski komitet KP Senja) placed priority on the assignment to secure a food supply line from Olib to Velebit over the 2nd Coastal Operation Sector (Serbo-Croatian: II. Primorska Operativna Sekcija). Already on March 16th the Secretary of the Kotar Committee of Senj relayed the information from Olib to the Okrug Committee of the Communist Party of Croatia (Croatian: Okružni komitet KPH), that the task had been carried out and that he was returning to Velebit in the evening with 16 Yugoslav Partisans from various command posts who were on Olib with him, and with 2 saboteurs who had participated in the operation. The transport of food from Olib to Pag had been difficult, as it had to be done in small brazzera with oars. The food was kept in bunkers and at night transported from Stara Novalja to Velebit in three trips. The process was repeated regularly. Still in March, a regular transport route Velebit-Olib-Molat was established in two variants: one across the Velebit Channel between Pag and Rab ending variously at Olib or Molat, and the other across the Velebit Channel to Pag at Pastura, where the Novalja Partisans transported it to a rowboat hidden by a valley, and on to Olib.

After the Second World War it returned to Yugoslavia and, after the dissolution of Yugoslavia in 1991, the island became part of the Republic of Croatia.

== Economy ==
The first Croatian wind farm was constructed on Pag island, just northeast of Pag town. The 5.95 MW "Vjetroelektrana Ravna 1" wind farm is composed of seven Vestas V52 wind turbines and has operated since 2004.

Throughout its history, Pag has been connected with salt production, a traditional activity that has been practiced for more than a thousand years. While the earliest historical records of salt production on the island date to 999, it is believed salt was produced on Pag in Roman times. The origin of the town of Pag is connected with the exploitation of natural suitably shallow coves within the closed bay (the so-called Valle di Pago) for salt manufacturing.

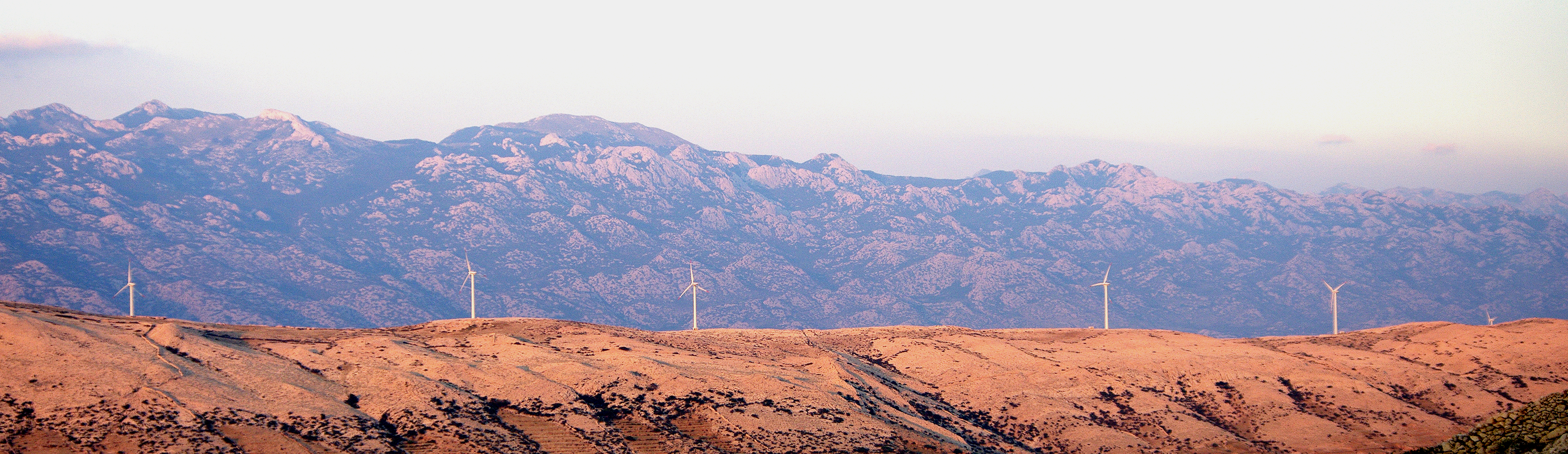
Ravne 1 wind farm

== Notable people ==
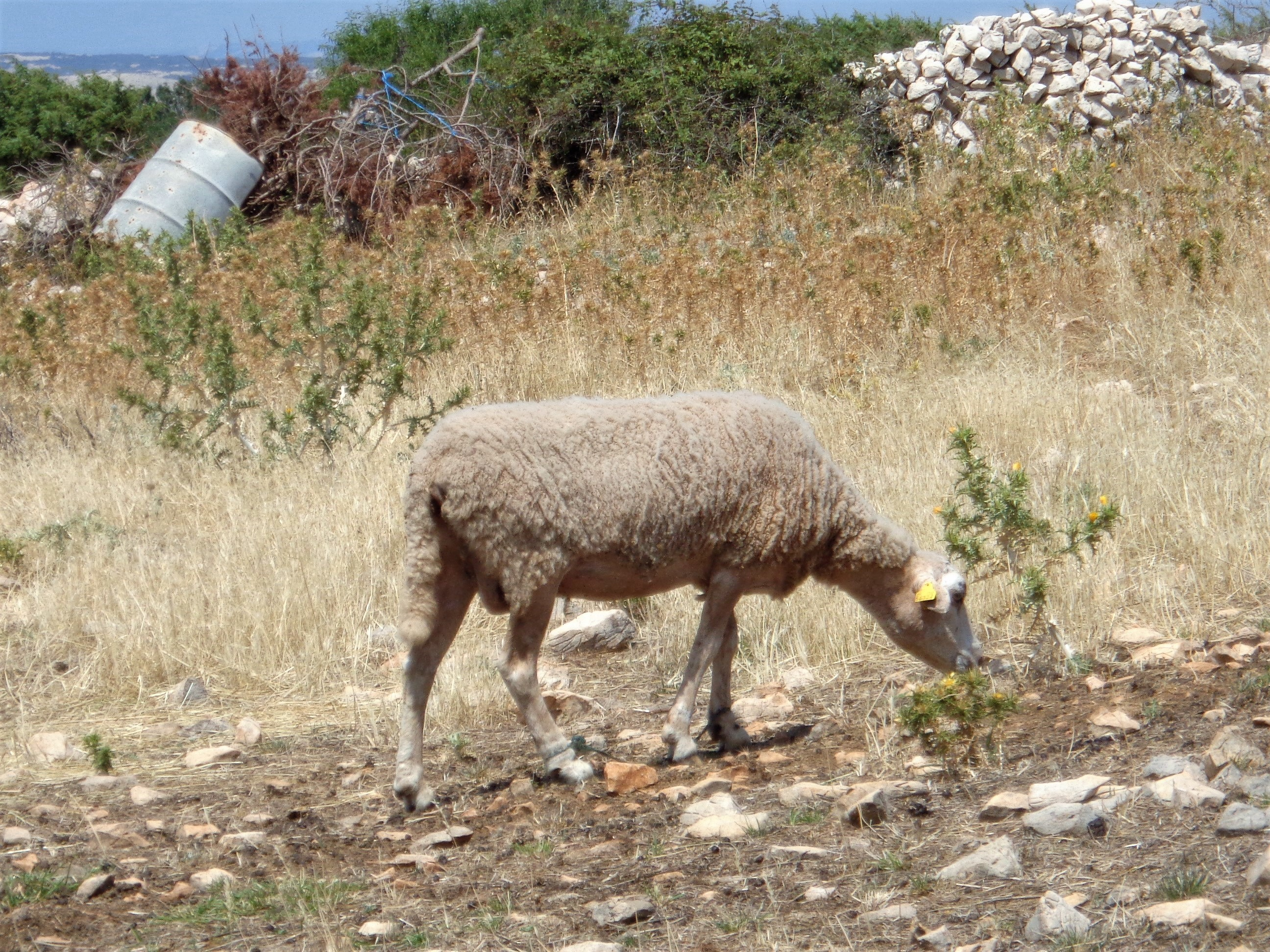
Pag sheep

- Bartol Kašić (August 15, 1575 – December 28, 1650) was a Jesuit clergyman and grammarian during the Counter-Reformation, who wrote the first Croatian grammar and translated the Bible and the Roman Rite into Croatian.

== See also ==
- Pag cheese
- Pag lace
- Pag Triangle

== Bibliography ==
- Ružić, Oren (1984-02-15). "Uspostavljanje i funkcioniranje komunikacija Velebitskim kanalom između otoka Paga i Raba i Podgorja u tijeku Narodnooslobodilačke borbe". Senjski zbornik (in Croatian). 10–11 (10–11): 307–310. ISSN 0582-673X.
