= Pag (town) =

- Town
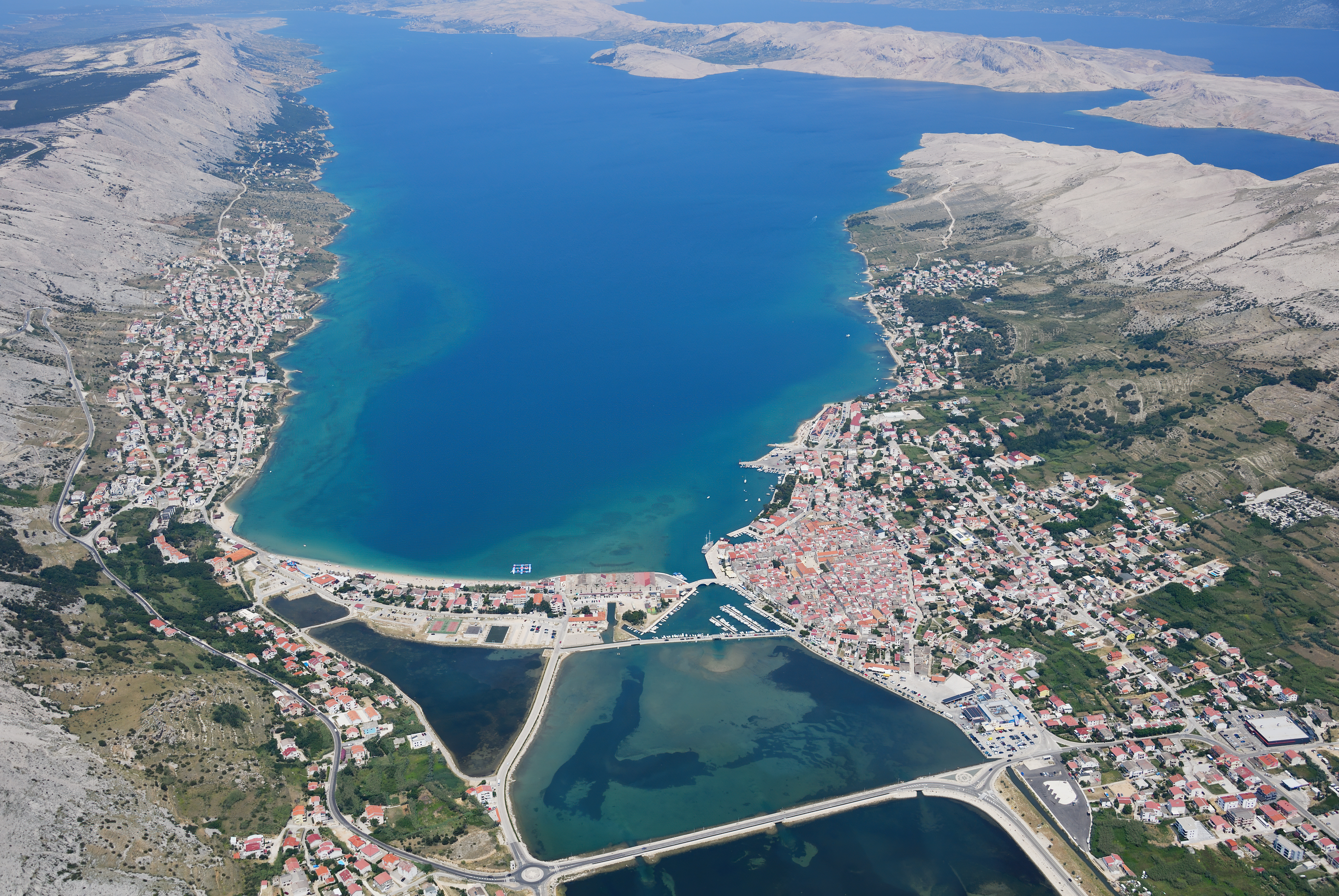
- Aerial view of the town

- Location of Pag within Croatia
- Coordinates: 44°29′N 14°57′E
- Country: Croatia
- County: Zadar County
- Island: Pag

Government
  - Mayor: Ante Fabijanić Njokulin (MODES)

Area
  - Town: 132.8 km^{2} (51.3 sq mi)
  - Urban: 65.1 km^{2} (25.1 sq mi)
- Elevation: 0 m (0 ft)

Population (2021)
  - Town: 3,175
  - Density: 23.91/km^{2} (61.92/sq mi)
  - Urban: 2,322
  - Urban density: 35.7/km^{2} (92.4/sq mi)
- Time zone: UTC+1 (CET)
  - Summer (DST): UTC+2 (CEST)
- Postal code: 23 250
- Area code: 023
- Website: pag.hr

Pag (Italian: Pago, German: Baag) is the largest town on the island of Pag, with a population of 2,343 (2021) in the urban core and 3,178 in the entire municipality.

== History ==
Medieval Pag emerged near the salterns where the abandoned Old Town used to be, 3 kilometres (2 miles) south of the present location. According to historical documents, the name Pag was mentioned for the first time in the 10th century. In 976, the Croatian king Stjepan Držislav took Pag from the Byzantine authority and appointed a Croatian district Prefect as the administrator of the town. In 1102, the Croatians voluntary formed a union with Hungary under King Coloman, as they had a succession crisis after the death of Demetrius Zvonimir. Hungary did agree to maintain the Croatian nobility, with the Sabor (Council of Croatian nobles) and a ban (Croat viceroy).

In 1244 Hungarian king Béla IV granted Pag the status of a free royal town. After the rebellion against Zadar, Pag obtained partial autonomy, and Ludovic I acknowledged its full autonomy in 1376 as to all other Dalmatian towns. In the battles against Zadar which took place in 1394, Pag suffered a heavy defeat and devastation, and the inhabitants moved to a new location, where the present Pag was founded.

In 1403, King Louis the Great, the King of Hungary and also of Croatia and Poland, sold his share of Dalmatia, Pag included, to Venice and thus sentenced Pag to a centuries-long life under Venetian rule. In 1433 Pag received the Town Statute, one of the first documents of that sort in Croatia.

In the middle of the 15th century, the Ottoman threat kept rising and therefore the inhabitants of Pag decided to build a new town. The construction works began on today's location of the town, on 18 May 1443. The urban plans of the new town were developed in Venice respecting the principles of architecture and urbanism of that time. Giorgio da Sebenico (= Juraj Dalmatinac), a great constructor and sculptor participated in the development of the urban plan.

In the 19th century, the town was ruled by the Austrian monarchy, Dalmatia Province, until the creation of the Kingdom of Serbs, Croats and Slovenes in 1918, under the bilingual name Pag-Pago.

In the late 19th century and the early 20th century, the town of Pag had 4700 inhabitants. In later years, and especially in 1905, following the emergence of a blight, which had destroyed the vineyards, the population started declining. Many inhabitants emigrated, mostly to the United States, Canada and Australia.

Another wave of depopulation of Pag town and island took place at the end of the Second World War. In this period, the nobility completely ceased to exist.

During the Croatian War of Independence in 1991, the only link between southern and northern Croatia was the island Pag, thanks to the bridge that connects it to the mainland on the south and a ferry line on the north of Pag.

== Climate ==
Since records began in 1978, the highest temperature recorded at the local weather station was 40.4 °C (104.7 °F), on 24 July 1998. The coldest temperature was −8.0 °C (17.6 °F), on 4 February 2012.

== Cultural heritage ==
Pag was the seat of a Roman Catholic Bishop of Cissa.

In 1443 the new town was founded and built according to new principles of town-planning. The longitudinal and the transversal streets, the latter known as Vela ulica, intersect at a right angle, forming in this way a rectangular square with the Collegiate Church, the Duke's Palace and the unfinished Bishop's Palace, which, as well as the town walls, were built by the famous mason and sculptor Giorgio da Sebenico.

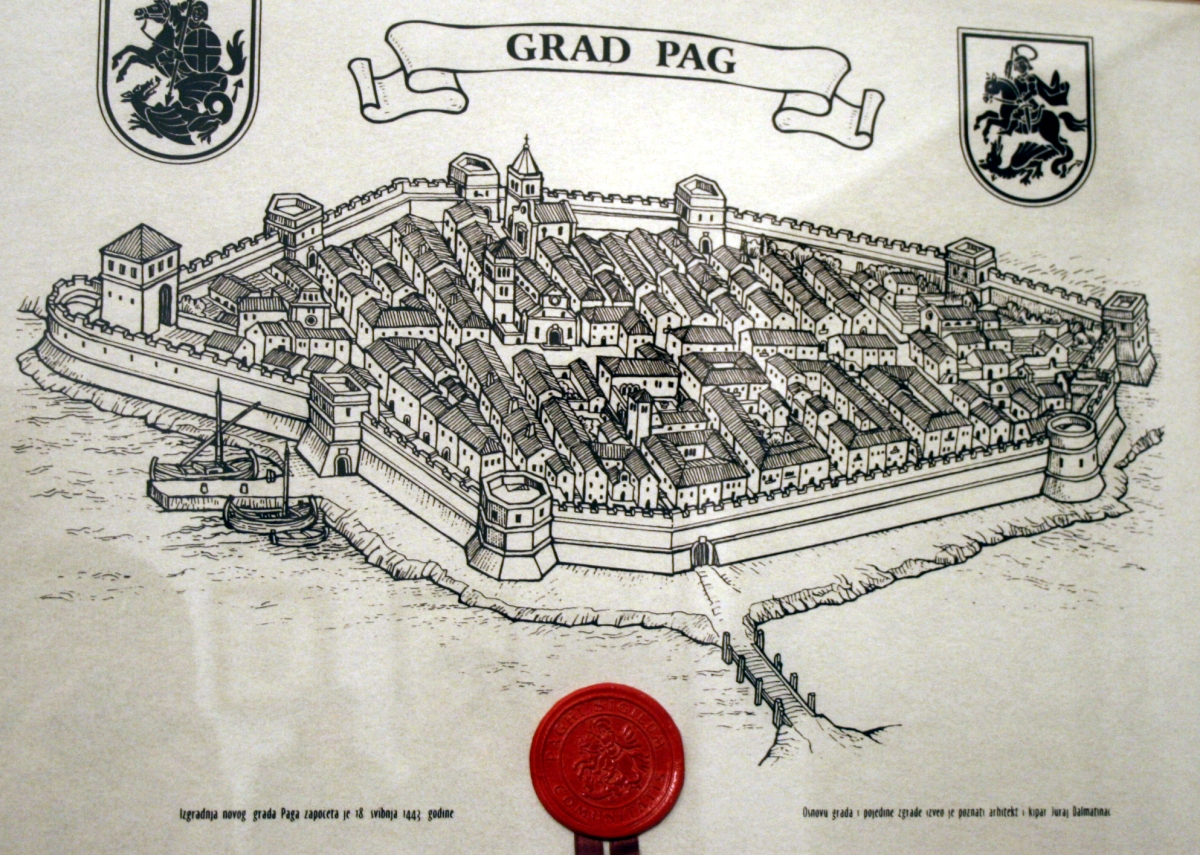
Pag 1443

The Collegiate Church is a three-nave basilica with three apses. The simple front is decorated with a Gothic portal, a Renaissance rosette and unfinished figures of the saints. In 1466 Juraj Dalmatinac became supervisor of the construction works on the church, while the building itself was carried out by his disciples; finished not before the beginning of the 16th century; restored in the 18th century, when the stucco work on the ceiling was performed. The church accommodates valuable works of art: the altar painting Our Lady of the Rosary, the Gothic wooden cross, and the silver processional crucifix and reliquaries are safeguarded in the treasury. The bell tower with its present height was erected in 1526.

In the Benedictine church of St. Marguerite, constructed after the plan of Giorgio da Sebenico, a silver processional cross and reliquaries are kept. The church of St. George, bearing Renaissance features, is a work of local masons from the 16th century.

There are several houses and smaller palaces with Renaissance façades, portals and coats of arms of local noble families in the town.

The Old Town includes partially preserved walls and the main church, a three-nave basilica built in the Romanesque style; the fronts of the Romanesque and Gothic styles were built in 1392 by the sculptor Paul from Sulmona. The ruins of a Franciscan monastery from 1589 are near the church.

Pag Town is also the place of origin of Paška čipka, the famous lacework whose first mention is related to sisters of the Order of Saint Benedict in 1579. It has been on Unesco's list of Intangible cultural heritage since 2009.

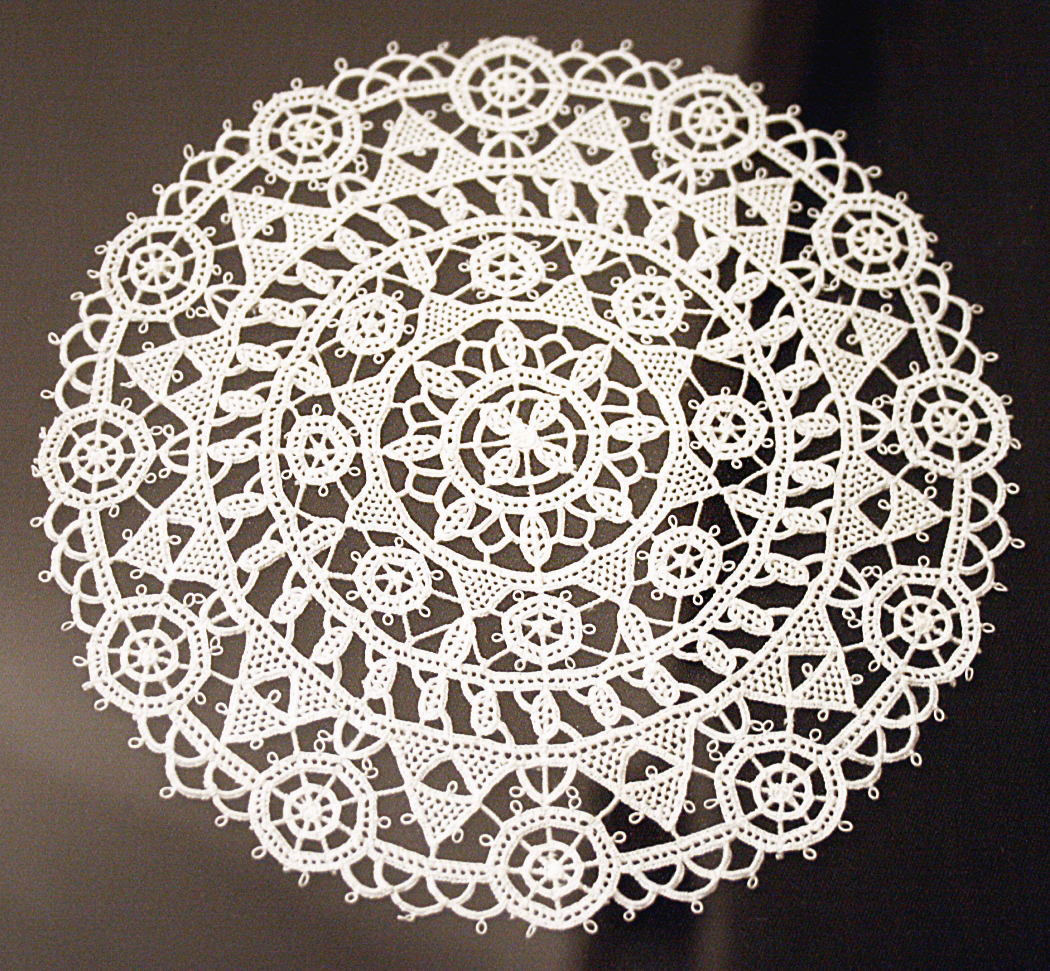
Famous lacework of Pag

== Population ==
Town of Pag: Population trends 1857–2021
v

population	3407	3643	3964	4142	4712	4585	4585	4479	4754	4683	4289	3819	3733	4116	4350	3846	3175
	1857	1869	1880	1890	1900	1910	1921	1931	1948	1953	1961	1971	1981	1991	2001	2011	2021

Sources: Croatian Bureau of Statistics publications

== Politics ==
=== Minority councils and representatives ===
Directly elected minority councils and representatives are tasked with consulting tasks for the local or regional authorities in which they are advocating for minority rights and interests, integration into public life and participation in the management of local affairs. At the 2023 Croatian national minorities councils and representatives elections Albanians of Croatia fulfilled legal requirements to elect 15 members minority councils of the Town of Pag but the elections were not organized due to the absence of candidatures.

== Economy ==
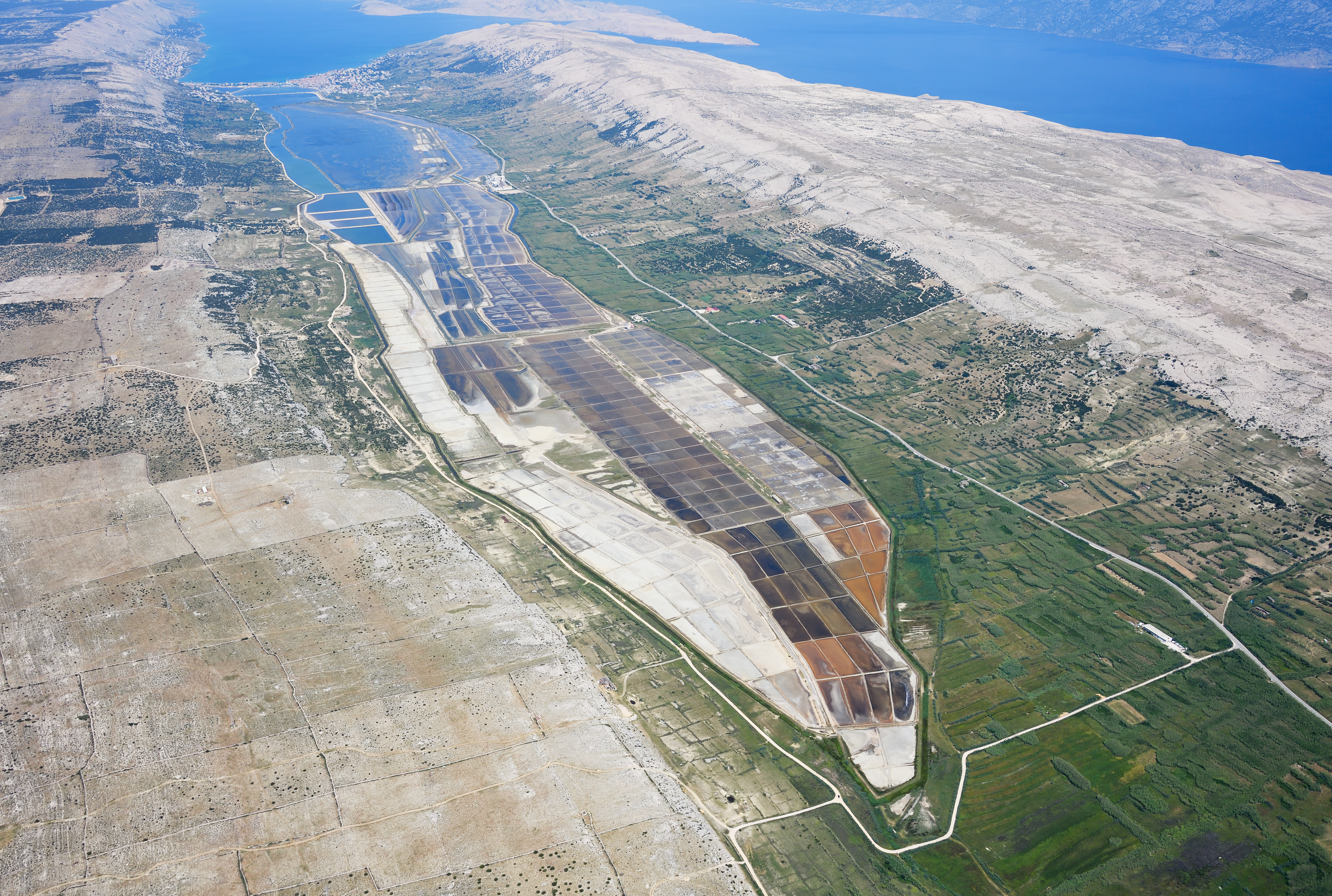
Aerial view of the Pag salt evaporation ponds

Traditionally, cattle and sheep breeding, along with salt extraction, fishing and agriculture have been the basis of survival on the island throughout the centuries. The tradition of salt extraction most probably originates from the times of the first settlement in this area.

These traditional activities have been maintained until the present day. Now, around 40,000 sheep are kept on the island. Around 33,000 tons of salt are produced yearly, two-thirds of the total production in Croatia. The salt basins are spread over 3.01 square kilometres (301.00 hectares).

Pag's economy is predominantly centered on tourism, which has experienced significant growth in recent decades. The town features a well-maintained public beach suitable for families near its center. Local cultural products include traditional Pag lace, recognized nationally, and Paški sir, a prominent regional cheese. Traditional national costumes also serve as notable local souvenirs. Together with its distinctive karst landscape, these cultural and natural attributes support Pag and the Pag Bay as a prominent regional destination.

Pag is often called the "island of stone" or the "island of the moon" because of the appearance of its surface, and is one of the sunniest islands in the Adriatic with over 2,500 hours of sunshine per year.

== Gallery ==
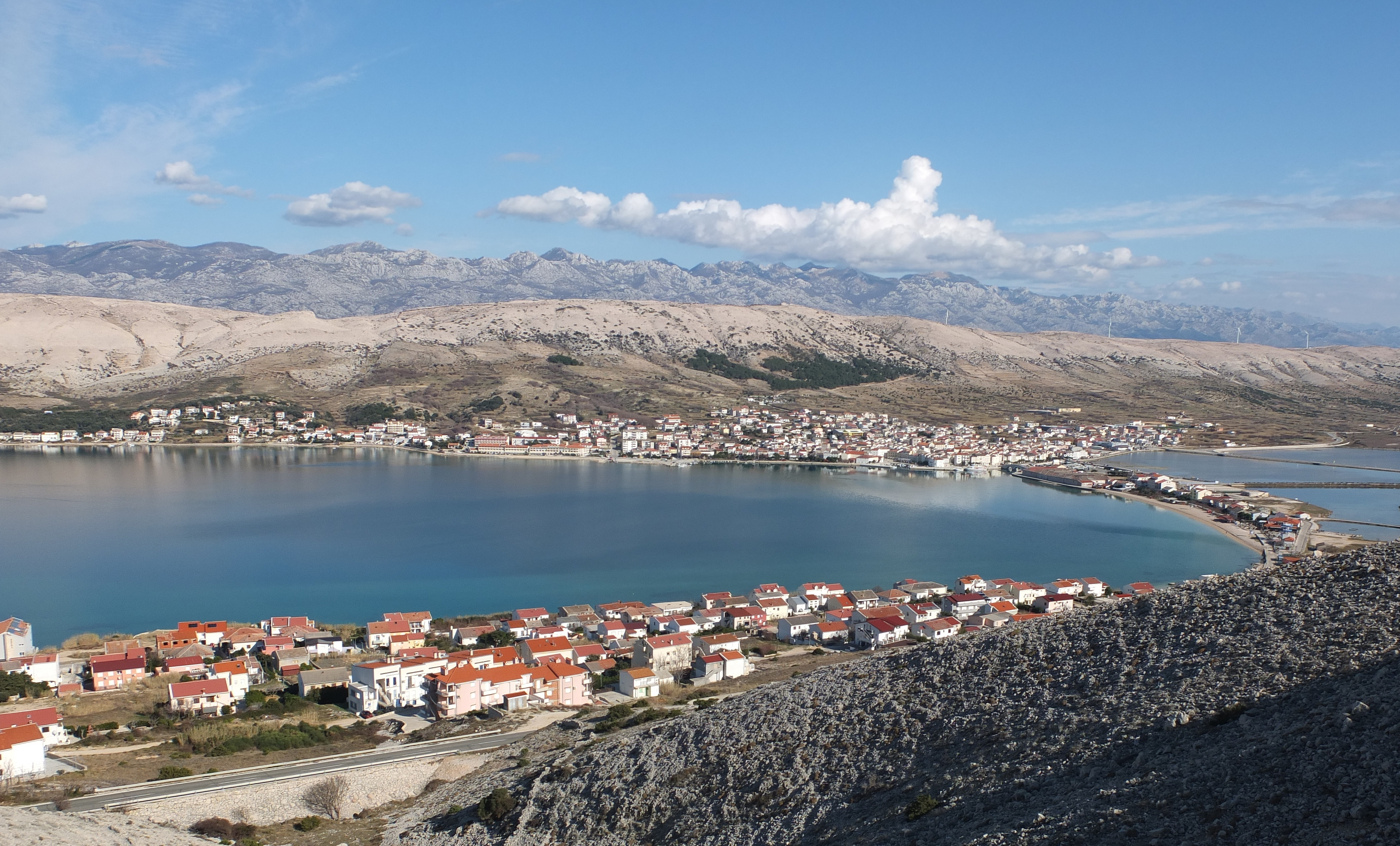
View of Pag from West.

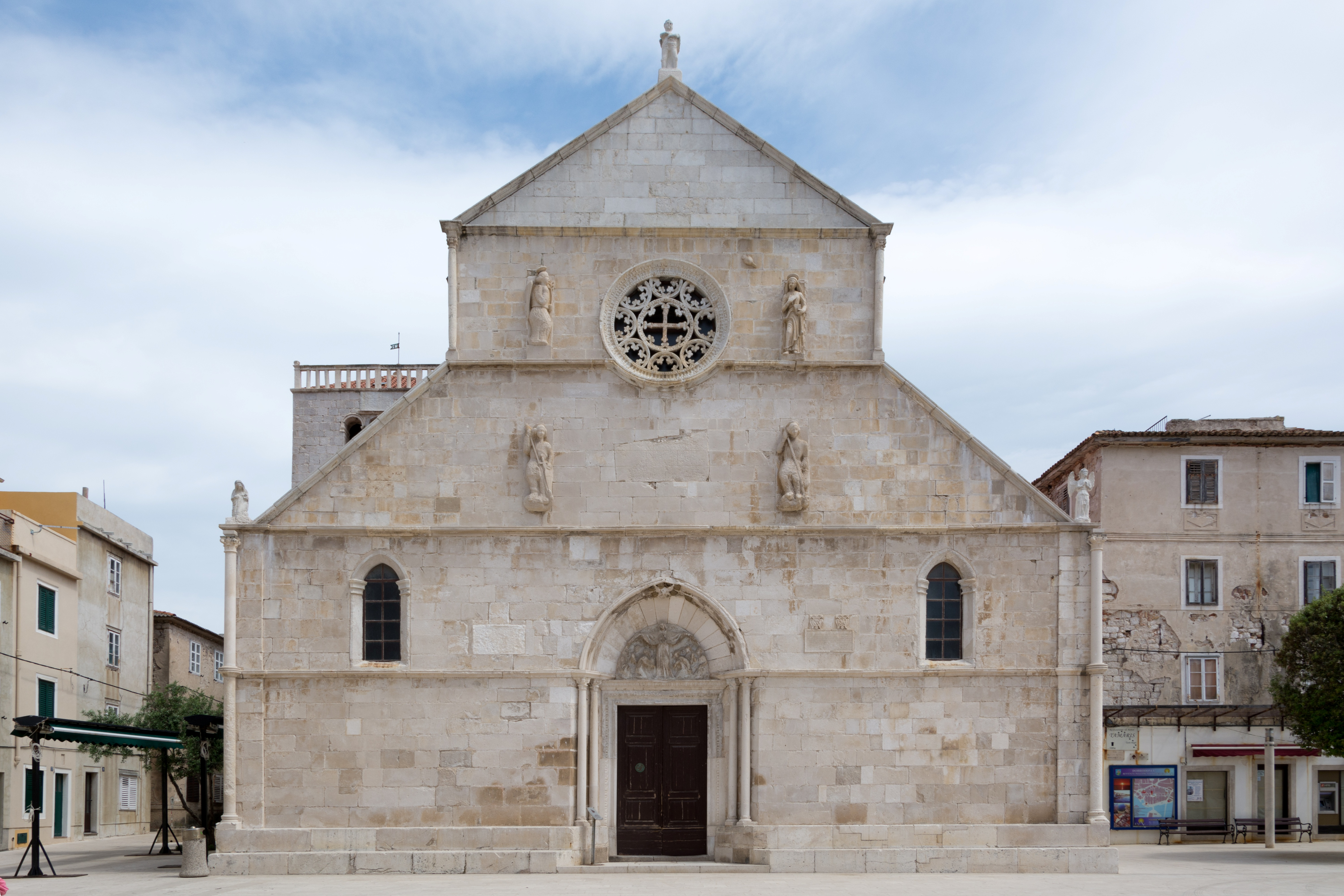
Basilika Assumption of Mary

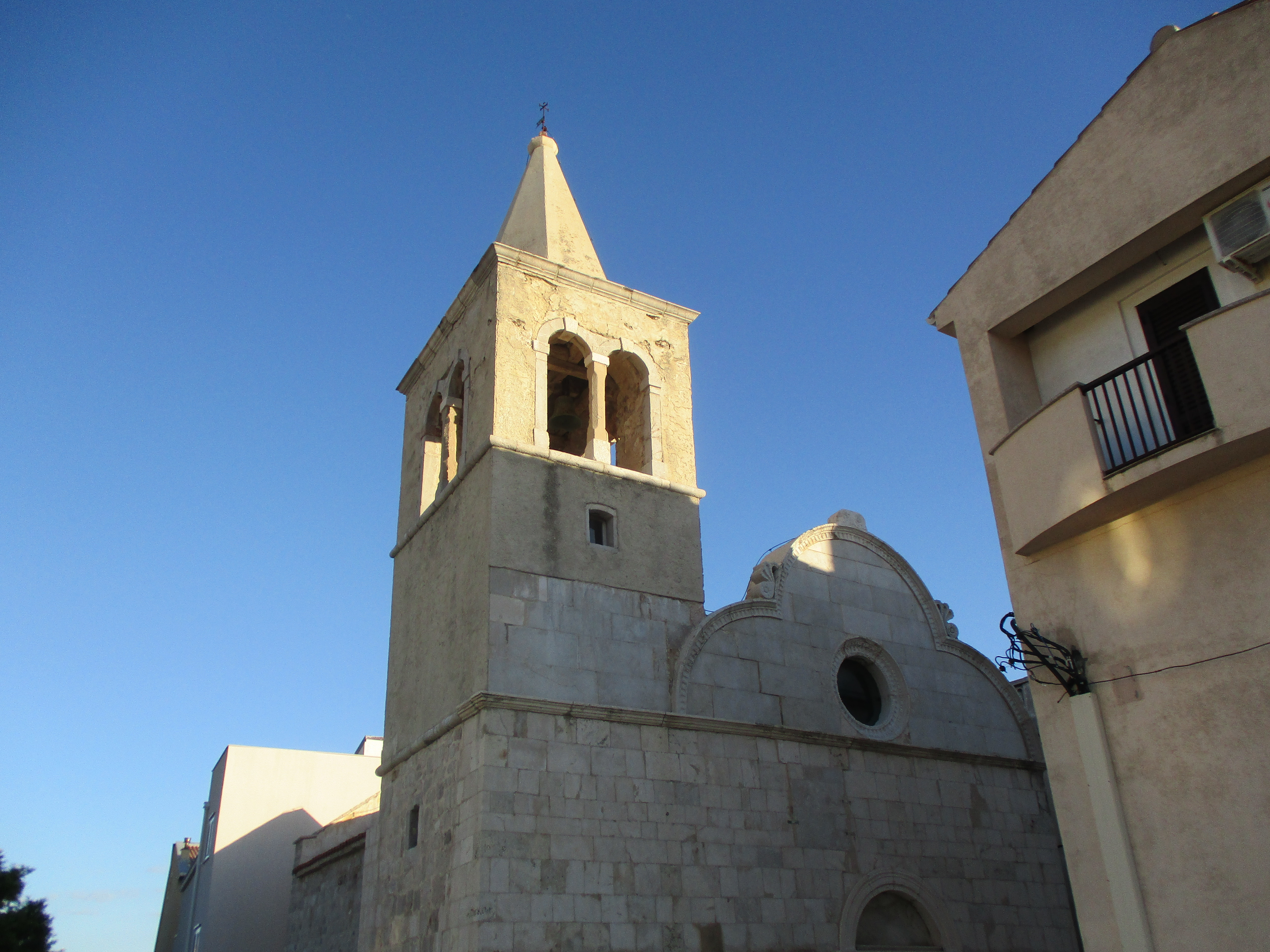

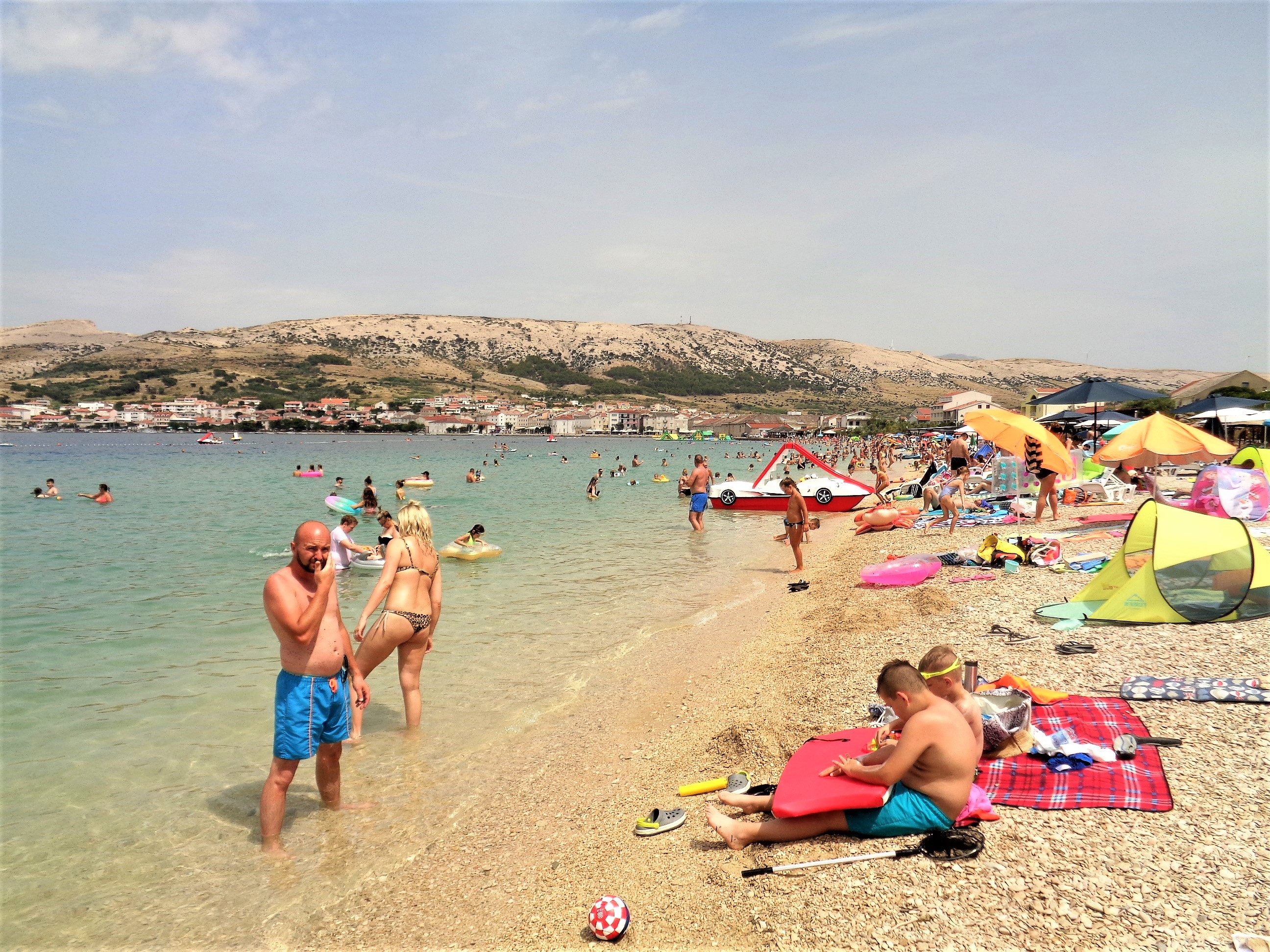
Prosika Beach
