= Gajac =

Gajac may refer to:

- Gajac, Croatia, a village on the island of Pag
- Kolanjski Gajac, a village on the island of Pag
- Gajac, Gironde, a village in France
