= Mandre =

Mandre may refer to:

- Mandré, stage name of Michael Andre Lewis (1948–2012), American musician
- Mandre, Croatia, a village on the island of Pag, Zadar County
