= Kolanjski Gajac =

Village in Zadar County, Croatia

- Village
- Location within Croatia
- Coordinates: 44.52774°N 14.90099°E
- Country: Croatia
- County: Zadar County
- Municipality: Kolan

Area
  - Total: 0.5 km^{2} (0.19 sq mi)

Population (2021)
  - Total: 16
  - Density: 32/km^{2} (83/sq mi)
- Time zone: UTC+1 (CET)
  - Summer (DST): UTC+2 (CEST)
- Postal code: 23251
- Area code: 023
- Vehicle registration: ZD

Kolanjski Gajac is a coastal village located on the Croatian island of Pag, in Zadar County. It is part of the municipality of Kolan. As of 2021, it had a population of 16. The settlement was created in 2001 by dividing Gajac between the town of Pag and Novalja.
