= Dubac-Varsan =

- Village
- Interactive map of Dubac-Varsan
- Location within Croatia
- Coordinates: 44.61613°N 14.81530°E
- Country: Croatia
- County: Lika-Senj
- Municipality: Novalja

Population (2021)
  - Total: 6
- Time zone: UTC+1 (CET)
  - Summer (DST): UTC+2 (CEST)

Dubac-Varsan is a village in Novalja, Croatia. It is located at the western coast of the island of Pag and it is connected by the D107 road.

== History ==
Dubac-Varsan was separated from the village of Potočnica, which it was part of until 2012.
