= LUN =

LUN or Lun may refers the same

- Logical Unit Number, in computer storage
- Los Angeles Union Station (Amtrak identifier code)
- Lun, Croatia, a town
- Lusaka International Airport (IATA airport code)
- Lunda language (ISO 639-3 language code)
- Lun-class ekranoplan, ground effect vehicles
- Monday (shorthand in several Romance languages)

== See also ==
- Las Últimas Noticias, Chilean daily, frequently shortened to LUN
