= Jakišnica =

Village in Lika-Senj County, Croatia

Jakišnica Iachisnizza
- Village
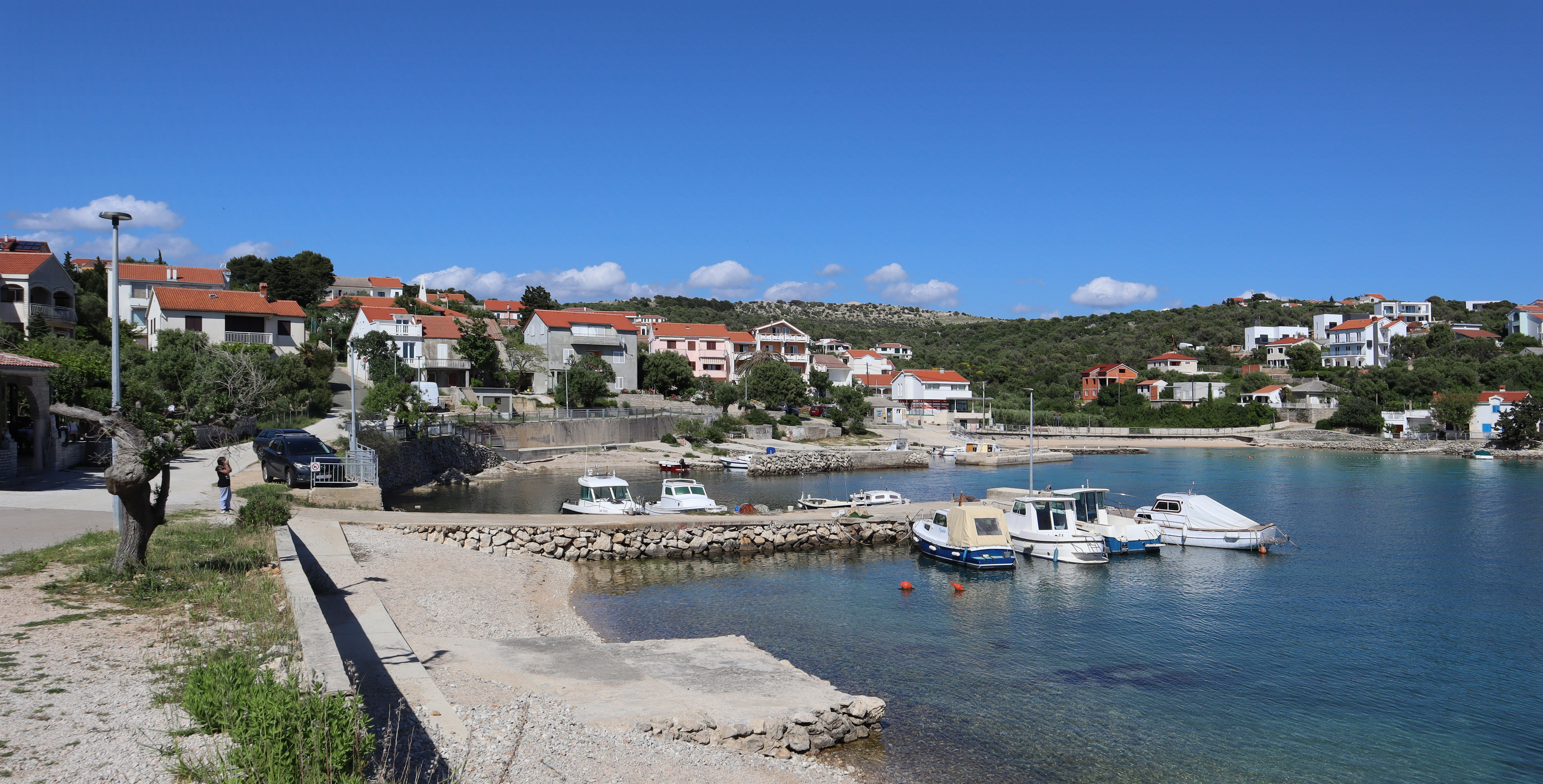
- Port of Jakišnica

- Location within Croatia
- Coordinates: 44.64478°N 14.77956°E
- Country: Croatia
- County: Lika-Senj
- Town: Novalja

Area
  - Total: 3.9 km^{2} (1.5 sq mi)

Population (2021)
  - Total: 118
  - Density: 30/km^{2} (78/sq mi)
- Time zone: UTC+1 (CET)
  - Summer (DST): UTC+2 (CEST)
- Postal code: 53 291
- Vehicle registration: GS

Jakišnica (Italian: Iachisnizza) is a coastal village on the Croatian island of Pag, in Lika-Senj County. Administratively, it is part of the town of Novalja. As of 2021, it had a population of 118. It is a popular tourist destination with many tourist facilities.
