= Zubovići, Croatia =

Village in Lika-Senj County, Croatia

Zubovići
- Village
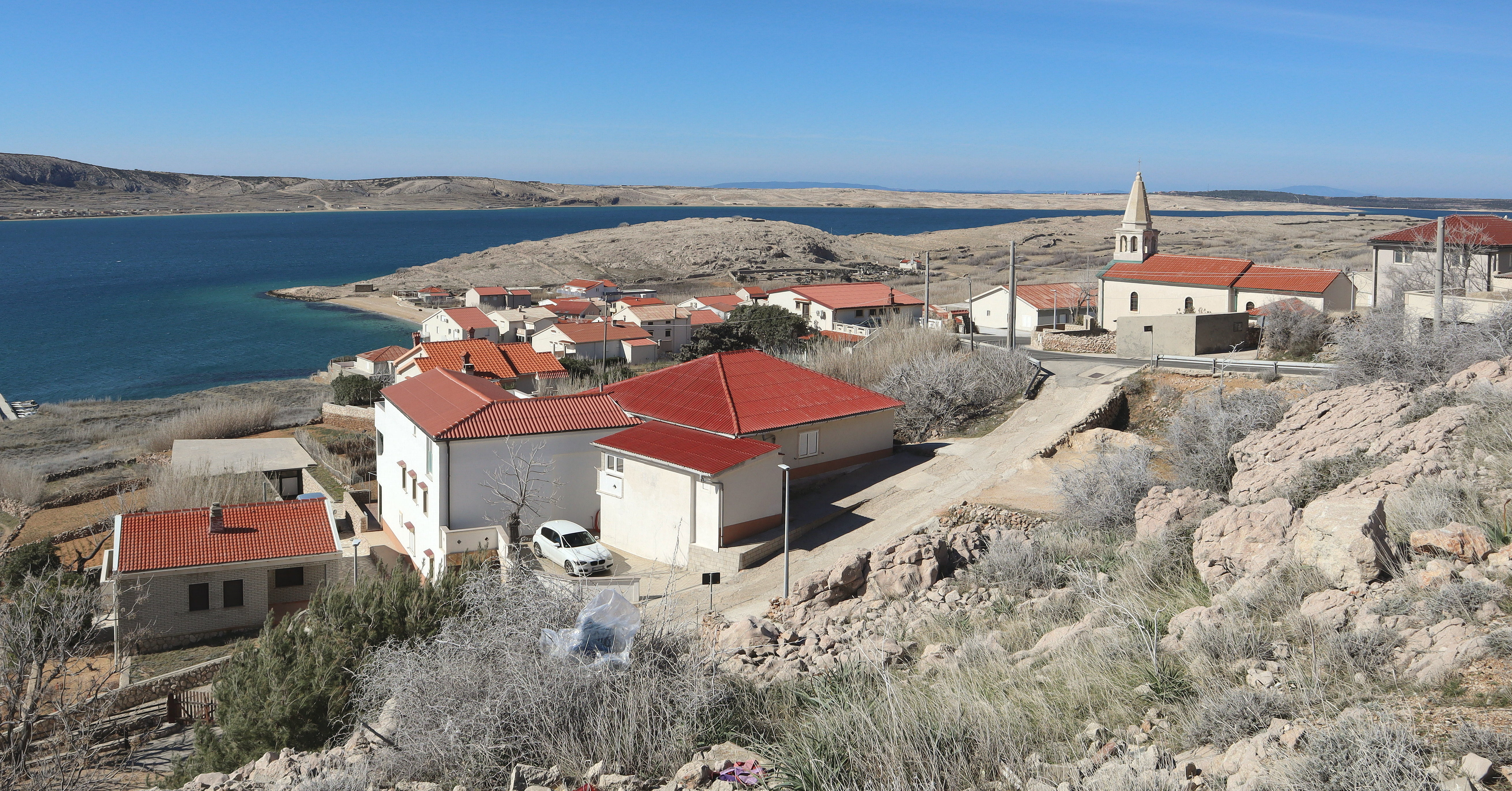
- View of Zubovići

- Location within Croatia
- Coordinates: 44.52376°N 14.97778°E
- Country: Croatia
- County: Lika-Senj
- Town: Novalja

Area
  - Total: 8.4 km^{2} (3.2 sq mi)

Population (2021)
  - Total: 180
  - Density: 21/km^{2} (55/sq mi)
- Time zone: UTC+1 (CET)
  - Summer (DST): UTC+2 (CEST)
- Postal code: 53 296
- Vehicle registration: GS

Zubovići is a coastal village on the Croatian island of Pag, in Lika-Senj County. Administratively, it is part of the town of Novalja. As of 2021, it had a population of 180.
