= Vidalići =

Village in Lika-Senj County, Croatia

Vidalići Vidalici
- Village
- Location within Croatia
- Coordinates: 44.53779°N 14.95217°E
- Country: Croatia
- County: Lika-Senj
- Town: Novalja

Area
  - Total: 0.3 km^{2} (0.12 sq mi)

Population (2021)
  - Total: 23
  - Density: 77/km^{2} (200/sq mi)
- Time zone: UTC+1 (CET)
  - Summer (DST): UTC+2 (CEST)
- Postal code: 53 296
- Vehicle registration: GS

Vidalići (Italian: Vidalici) is a coastal village on the Croatian island of Pag, in Lika-Senj County. Administratively, it is part of the town of Novalja. As of 2021, it had a population of 23.
