= Kustići =

Village in Lika-Senj County, Croatia

Kustići Cùstici
- Village
- Location within Croatia
- Coordinates: 44.52973°N 14.96227°E
- Country: Croatia
- County: Lika-Senj
- Town: Novalja

Area
  - Total: 5.2 km^{2} (2.0 sq mi)

Population (2021)
  - Total: 138
  - Density: 27/km^{2} (69/sq mi)
- Time zone: UTC+1 (CET)
  - Summer (DST): UTC+2 (CEST)
- Postal code: 53 296
- Vehicle registration: GS

Kustići (Italian: Cùstici) is a coastal village on the Croatian island of Pag, in Lika-Senj County. Administratively, it is part of the town of Novalja. As of 2021, it had a population of 138.
