= Maun (island) =

Island of Croatia

Coordinates: 44.426°N 14.924°E

Map

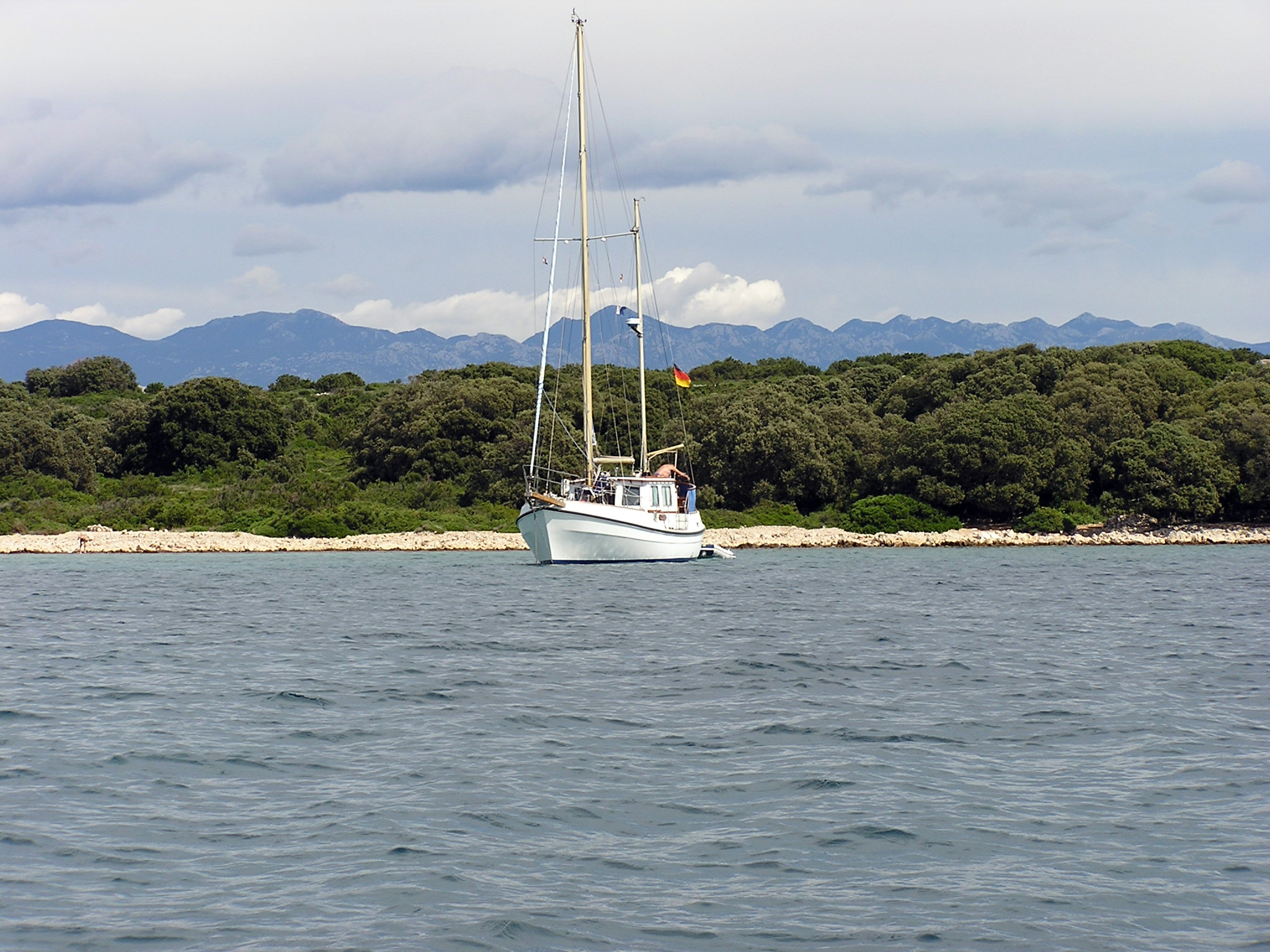
Sailboat off the island of Maun

Maun is an island in the Adriatic Sea located southwest of Pag and northeast of Olib. Its area is 8.50 km^{2} (3.28 sq mi).

After the first geological survey of the region, the initial verdict of Mamužić and Sokač was that small bauxite pockets at the Cretaceous-Paleogene boundary were present across the entire studied area, including on Maun, but apart from those at Novalja, no deposits were marked on the map because they were thought to be economically insignificant.

There is a large karst sinkhole on Maun filled with terra rossa, in which water remains longer after rains, allowing it to be used for watering small livstock.
