= Kolansko blato =

Ornithological reserve in Pag, Croatia

Coordinates: 44.52161°N 14.91309°E

Kolansko Blato
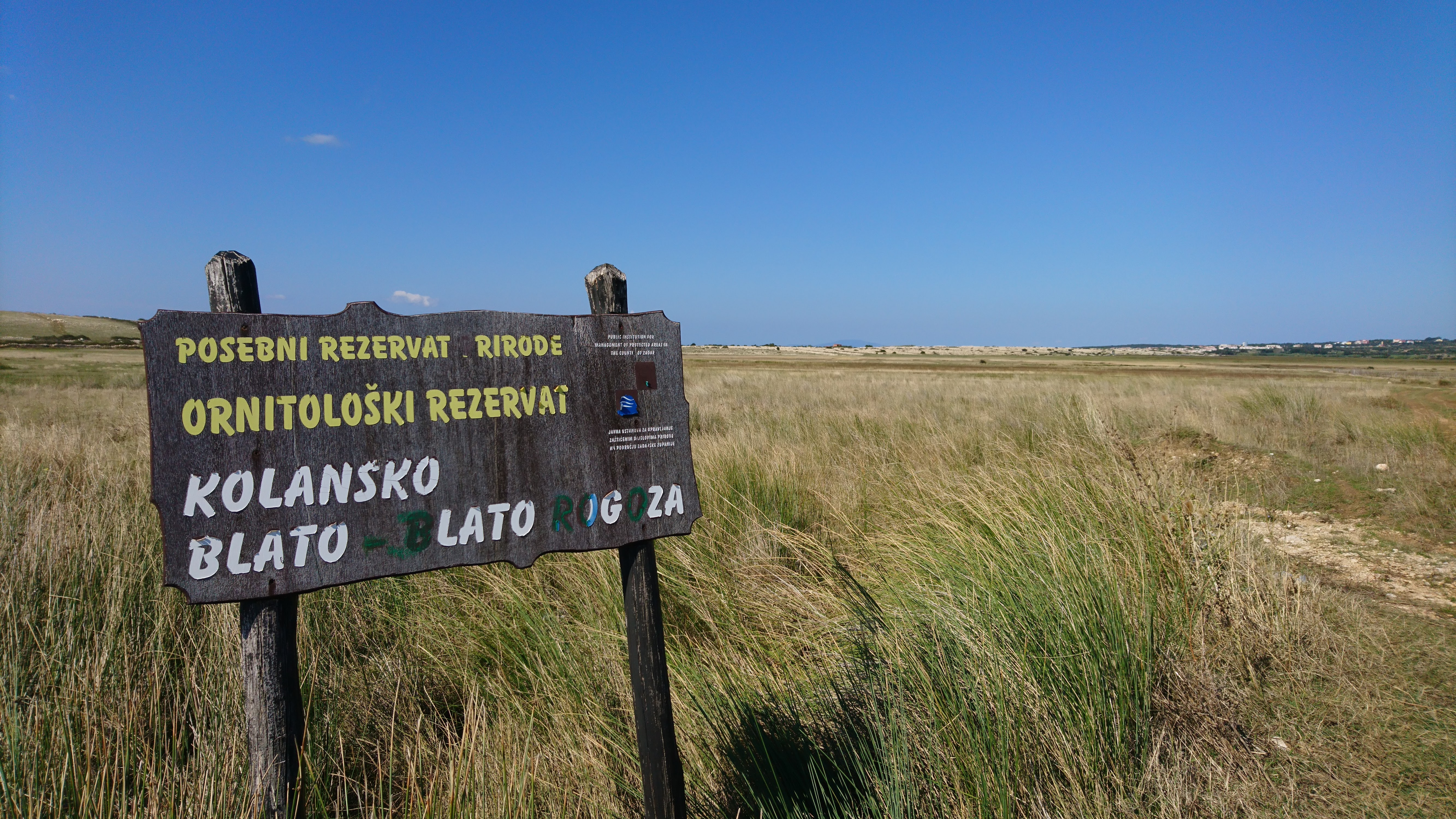
- Interactive map of Kolansko Blato
- Area: 5.35 km^{2} (2.07 sq mi)
- Established: 1988

Kolansko Blato is an ornithological reserve on the Croatian island of Pag. It was established in 1988 and covers an area of 535 ha of swamps. It is located on the south coast of the island of Pag between Novalja and Kolan.

== Description ==
Kolansko Blato is a Mediterranean swamp characterised by watercourses and wetland vegetation. The immediate surroundings are cultivated fields and rocky pastures. The reserve is important because of the variety of Mediterranean flora and fauna. It is also an important feeding, resting or overnight stay stop during spring and autumn bird migrations for birds originating from Croatia and other parts of Europe. 163 bird species were recorded in the reserve, of which 66 were nestling birds, including the great reed warbler, Eurasian reed warbler, mallard, common pochard, little grebe and glossy ibis.

The reserve is endangered for multiple reasons. The reeds that grow on the edges cover more water every year and thus the free surface of water is reduced. Irrational bird hunting, fly ash and the spreading of the Gajac settlement endanger this area.

== Bibliography ==
=== Biology ===
- Šašić, Martina; Nahirnić, Ana; Tarmann, Gerhard M. (2016-12-31). "Zygaenidae (Lepidoptera) in the Lepidoptera collections of the Croatian Natural History Museum". Natura Croatica: Periodicum Musei Historiae Naturalis Croatici. 25 (2): 233–248. doi:10.20302/NC.2016.25.19. eISSN 1848-7386.
