= Kolan, Croatia =

Settlement and municipality in Zadar County, Croatia

Kolan
- Municipality
- Municipality of Kolan; Općina Kolan
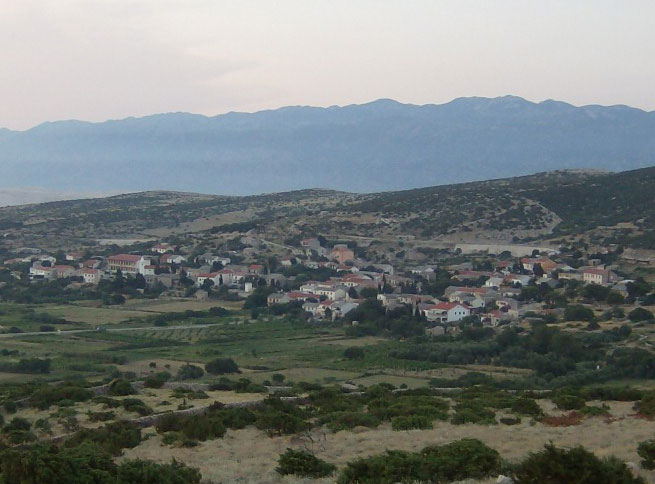
- View of Kolan
- Interactive map of Kolan
- Location within Croatia
- Coordinates: 44.49390°N 14.96109°E
- Country: Croatia
- Region: Dalmatia
- County: Zadar County

Government
  - Mayor: Šime Gligora

Area
  - Total: 22.7 km^{2} (8.8 sq mi)

Population (2021)
  - Total: 332
  - Density: 14.6/km^{2} (37.9/sq mi)
- Time zone: UTC+1 (CET)
  - Summer (DST): UTC+2 (CEST)
- Postal code: 23251
- Vehicle registration: ZD

Kolan is a settlement and municipality on the Croatian island of Pag, in Zadar County. As of 2021, the municipality had a total population of 815, and the settlement of Kolan itself had a population of 332.

It was established in 2003 by separation from the town of Pag.

The protected area Kolansko blato is named after the village.

== Demographics ==
In 2021, the municipality had 815 residents in the following settlements:

- Kolan, population 332
- Kolanjski Gajac, population 16
- Mandre, population 467
Kolan: Population trends 1857–2021
v

population	207	245	223	234	289	332	332	532	657	719	761	662	629	685	715	791	815
	1857	1869	1880	1890	1900	1910	1921	1931	1948	1953	1961	1971	1981	1991	2001	2011	2021

Sources: Croatian Bureau of Statistics publications
