= Gajac, Croatia =

Village in Lika-Senj County, Croatia

Gajac Porto Castello
- Village
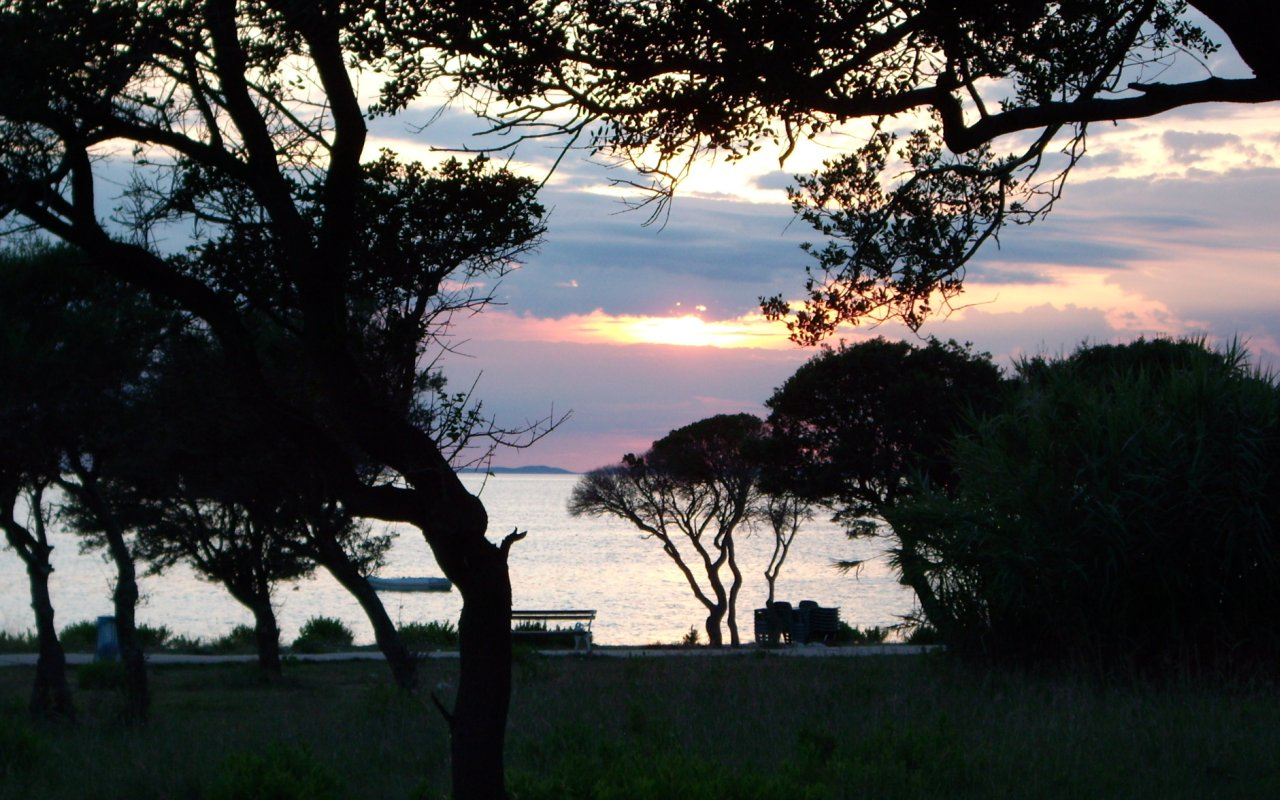
- View from Gajac

- Location within Croatia
- Coordinates: 44.53086°N 14.89659°E
- Country: Croatia
- County: Lika-Senj
- Town: Novalja

Area
  - Total: 0.3 km^{2} (0.12 sq mi)

Population (2021)
  - Total: 86
  - Density: 290/km^{2} (740/sq mi)
- Time zone: UTC+1 (CET)
  - Summer (DST): UTC+2 (CEST)
- Postal code: 53 291
- Vehicle registration: GS

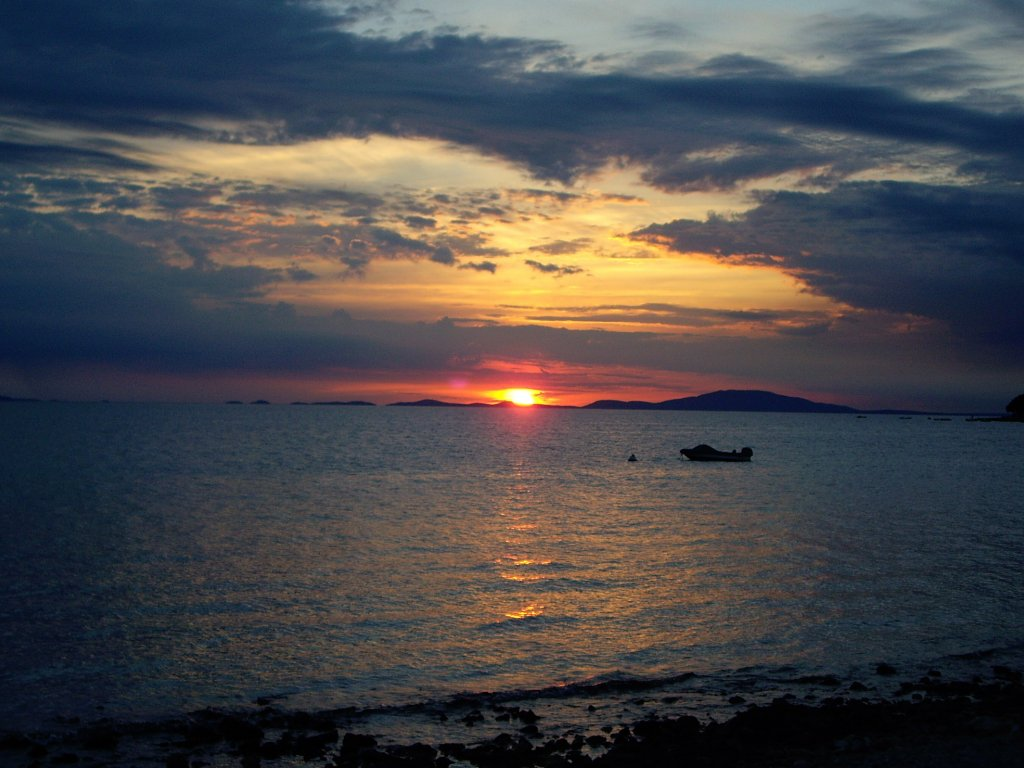
Gajac, Pag island, Croatia

Gajac (Italian: Porto Castello) is a village on the Adriatic Sea on the island of Pag, in Lika-Senj County. Administratively, it is part of the town of Novalja. There is a small permanent population and a seasonal tourist population from in and out of Croatia who lease or buy condos. According to the 2021 census, it had a population of 86.

Nearby locations include Zrće Beach, a well-known partygoers destination, and Kolansko blato, an ornithological reserve.
