= Mandre, Croatia =

Village in Zadar County, Croatia

Mandre
- Village
- Location within Croatia
- Coordinates: 44.47763°N 14.92019°E
- Country: Croatia
- County: Zadar County
- Municipality: Kolan

Area
  - Total: 5.7 km^{2} (2.2 sq mi)

Population (2021)
  - Total: 467
  - Density: 82/km^{2} (210/sq mi)
- Time zone: UTC+1 (CET)
  - Summer (DST): UTC+2 (CEST)
- Postal code: 23251
- Vehicle registration: ZD

Mandre is a coastal village on the Croatian island of Pag, in Zadar County. It is part of the municipality of Kolan. As of 2021, it had a population of 467.
