= Lun, Croatia =

Village in Lika-Senj County, Croatia

Lun
- Village
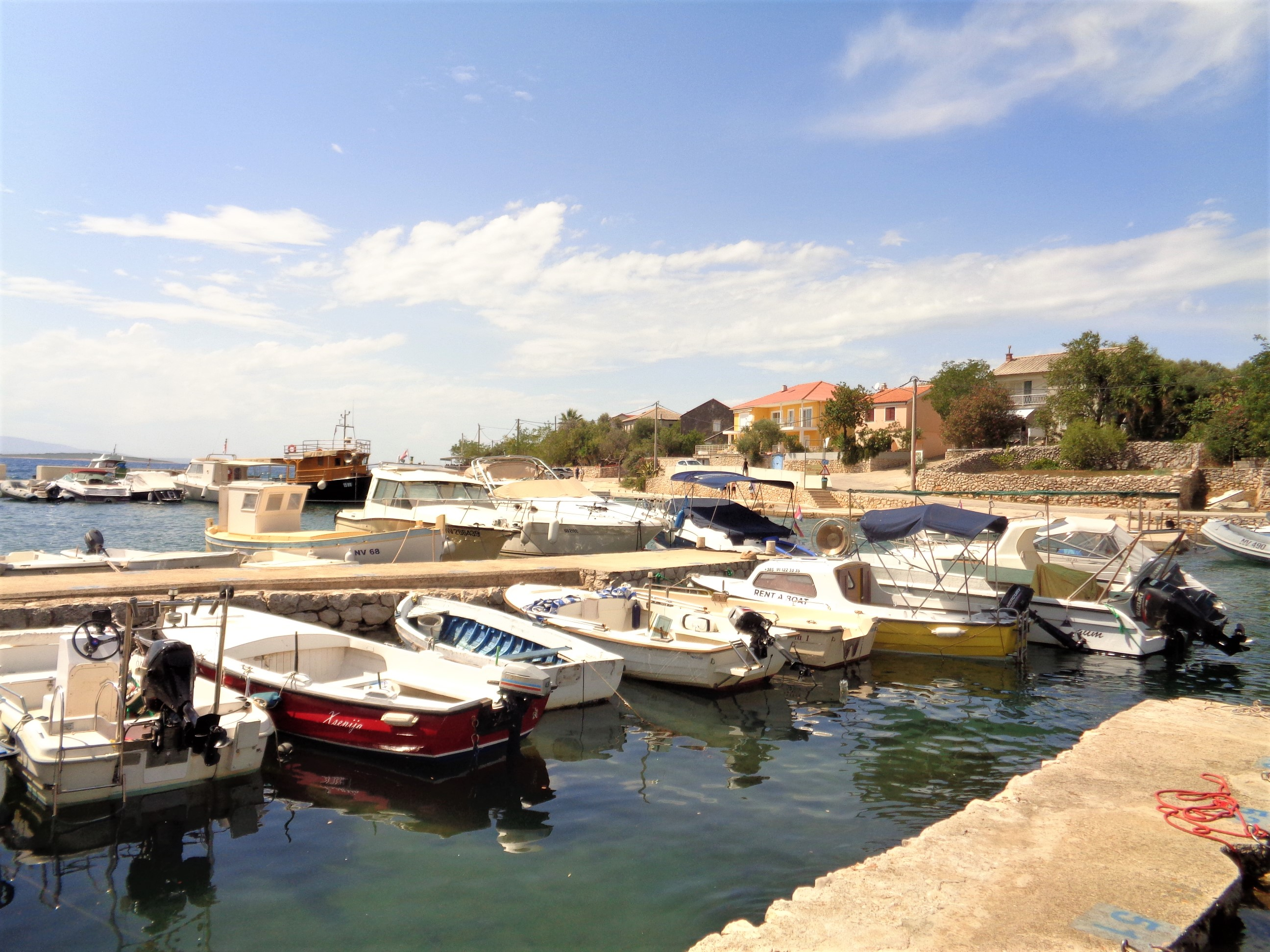
- The port of Lun
- Interactive map of Lun
- Location within Croatia
- Coordinates: 44.69103°N 14.73720°E
- Country: Croatia
- County: Lika-Senj
- Town: Novalja

Area
  - Total: 8.6 km^{2} (3.3 sq mi)

Population (2021)
  - Total: 148
  - Density: 17/km^{2} (45/sq mi)
- Time zone: UTC+1 (CET)
  - Summer (DST): UTC+2 (CEST)

Lun is a village in Lika-Senj County, Croatia, and the northernmost village of the Adriatic island of Pag. In the 2021 census, the village had a population of 148.

Lun is accessible from Novalja by automobile via the main road or from Rab via the Lun-Rab Passenger Ferry. The main village of Lun is situated about half a mile up the hill from the coast. Its port area is named Tovarnele.

The predominant occupation of its inhabitants in the summer months is keeping bed and breakfasts and restaurants for seasonal tourists. Additional family support is provided by fishing, and farming sheep, grapes, and olives.

Lun is known for its extensive olive garden, which contains thousands of ancient olive trees, including one that is claimed to be 2000 years old and another that is claimed to be 1600 years old. The garden also includes one of the world's largest collections of wild olive trees.

== Gallery ==
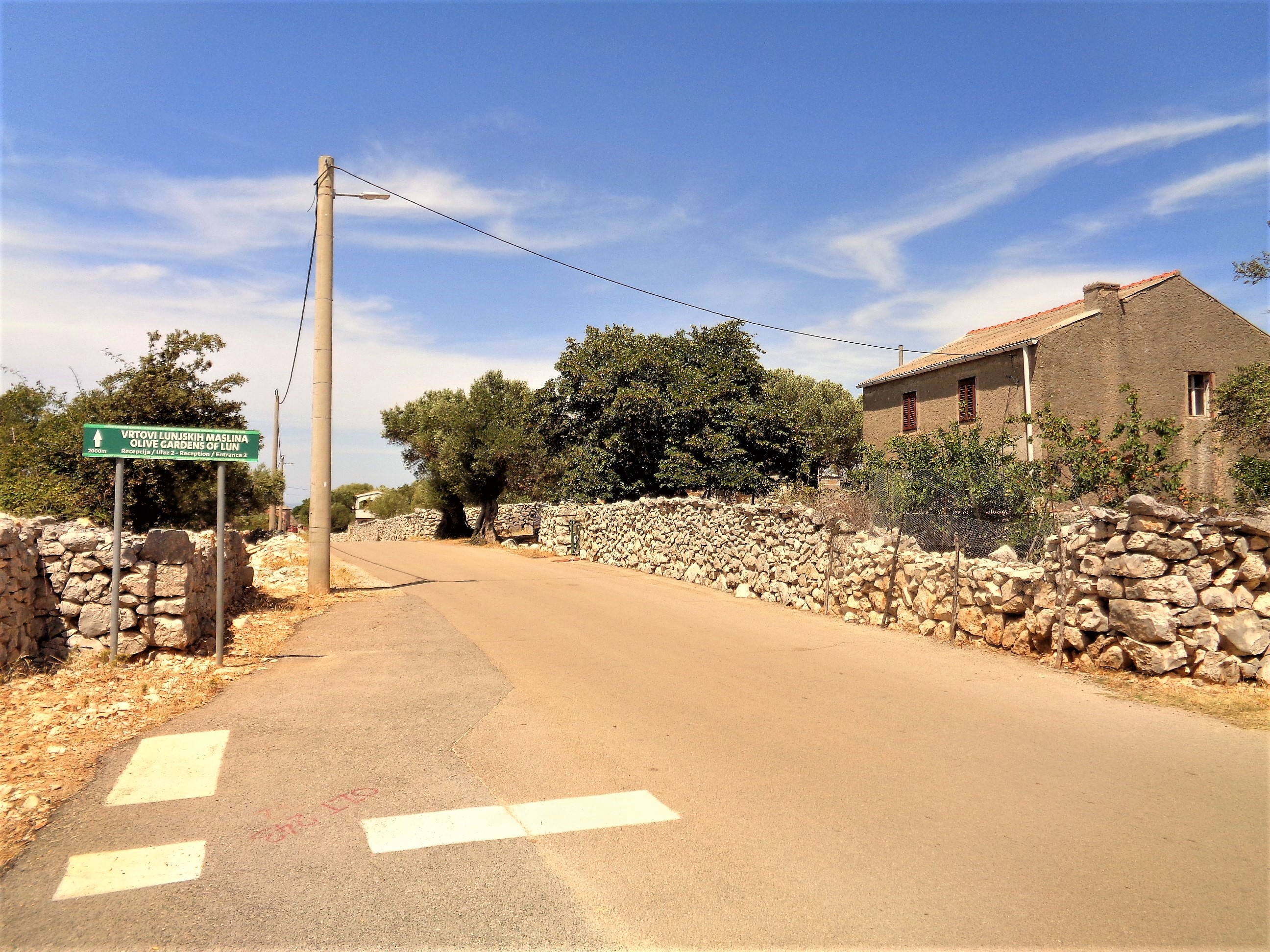
Street in Lun

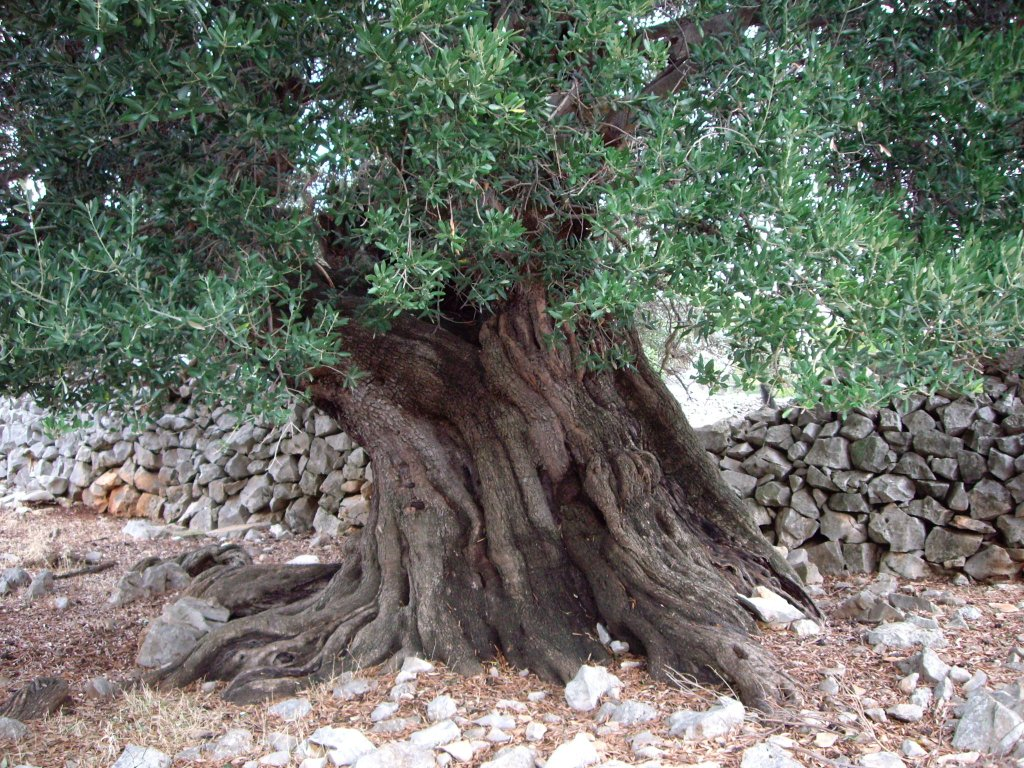
Olive tree near Lun

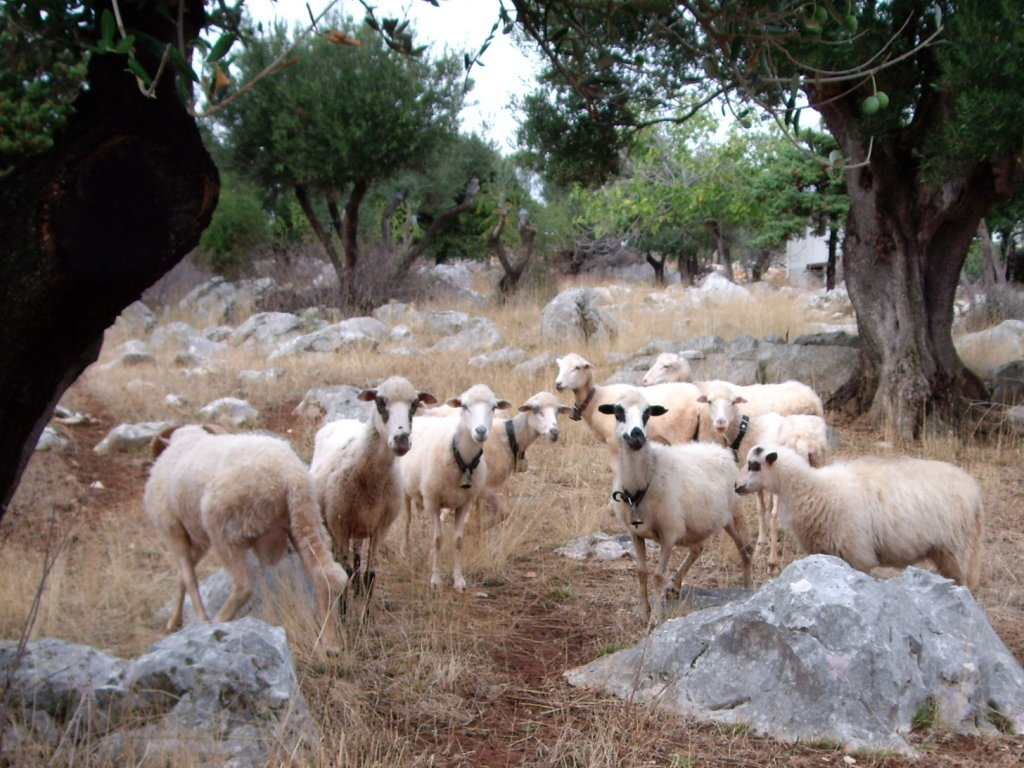
Sheep near Lun
