= Potočnica =

Village in Lika-Senj County, Croatia

Potočnica Potosnizza
- Village
- Location within Croatia
- Coordinates: 44.62630°N 14.80648°E
- Country: Croatia
- County: Lika-Senj
- Town: Novalja

Area
  - Total: 3.9 km^{2} (1.5 sq mi)

Population (2021)
  - Total: 8
  - Density: 2.1/km^{2} (5.3/sq mi)
- Time zone: UTC+1 (CET)
  - Summer (DST): UTC+2 (CEST)
- Postal code: 53 291
- Vehicle registration: GS

Potočnica (Italian: Potosnizza) is a small coastal village on the Croatian island of Pag, in Lika-Senj County. Administratively, it is part of the town of Novalja. As of 2021, it had a population of 8.
