= Novalja =

- Town
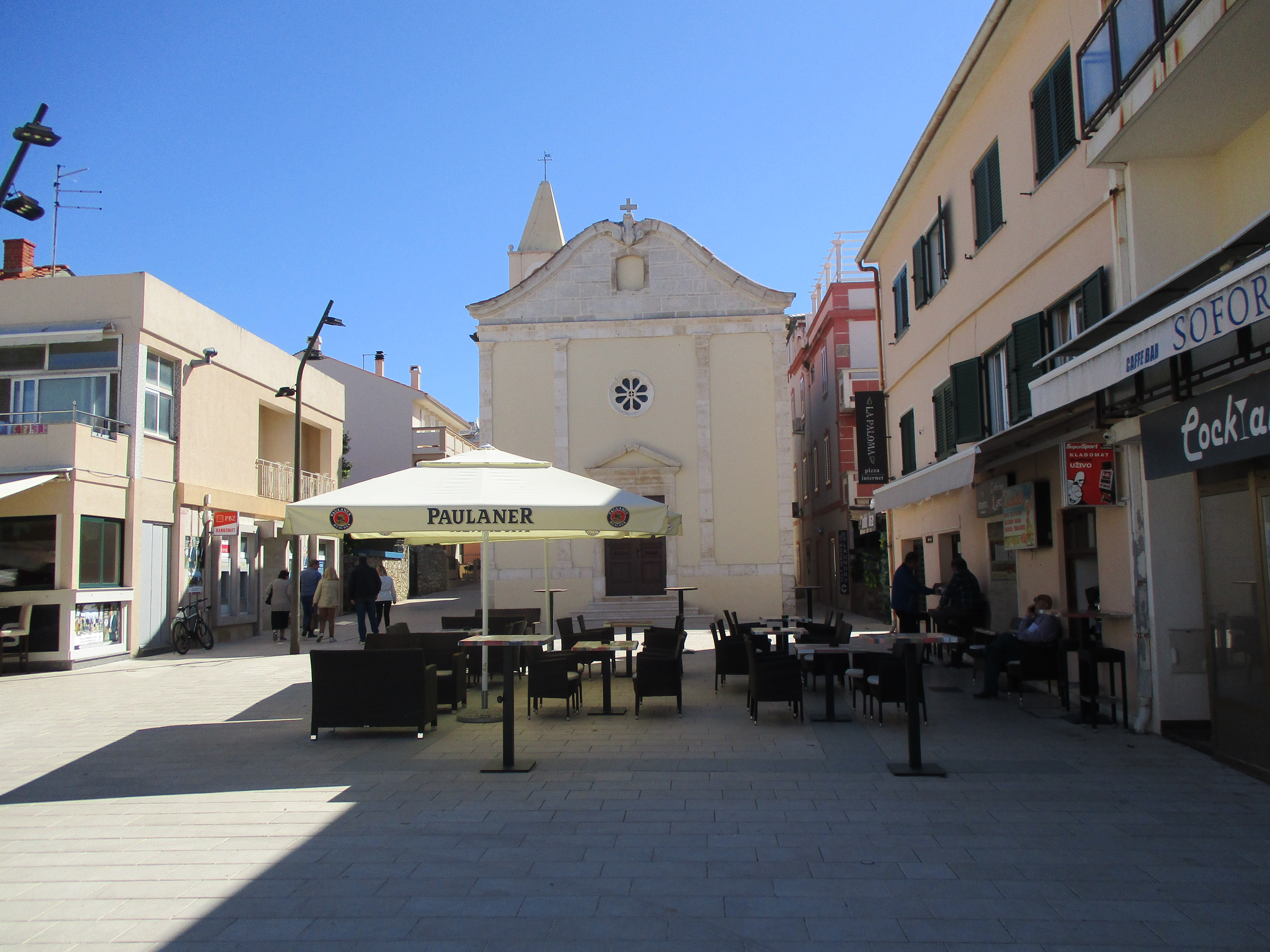
- Novalja city center

- Location within Croatia
- Coordinates: 44°33′N 14°53′E
- Country: Croatia
- County: Lika-Senj County
- Island: Pag

Government
  - Mayor: Ivan Dabo (HDZ)

Area
  - Town: 95.7 km^{2} (36.9 sq mi)
  - Urban: 42.5 km^{2} (16.4 sq mi)

Population (2021)
  - Town: 3,680
  - Density: 38.5/km^{2} (99.6/sq mi)
  - Urban: 2,415
  - Urban density: 56.8/km^{2} (147/sq mi)
- Time zone: UTC+1 (CET)
  - Summer (DST): UTC+2 (CEST)
- Website: novalja.hr

Novalja (pronounced [nǒʋaʎa]) is a town on the north of the island of Pag in the Croatian part of the Adriatic Sea. In recent times, Novalja has become famous because of the Zrće Beach.

== History ==
The earliest settlers on the island were an Illyrian tribe that came to the region in the Bronze Age; traces of their settlement can still be seen around Pag. In the 1st century BC, the Romans took possession and left numerous archeological and cultural artifacts.

Novalja is the successor of a Roman city called Cissa, which many scholars consider to be the seat of an ancient Christian bishopric of that name. Others prefer to identify the sea with an island city of the same name in Istria, close to present-day Rovinj. A bishop of Cissa named Vindemius took part in some year between 571 and 577 in a schismatic synod in Grado called by Patriarch Elias of Aquileia. Arrested by the Exarch of Ravenna, he was forced to abjure his views on the controversy of the Three Chapters, but once free from Byzantine Empire control, he reaffirmed his position and took part in another schismatic synod in 590. A bishop of Cissa called Ursinus took part in a synod at Rome in 680 and signed the acts. Soon after, Cissa ceased to exist, perhaps because of an earthquake. No longer a residential bishopric, Cissa is today listed by the Catholic Church as a titular see.

The Croats arrived in the 7th century, and settled there, along with the great migration. For some time, the island was under the rule of the Croatian kingdom. Yet the island was constantly fought over, and in the 11th and 12th centuries, was divided between the communities of Rab and Zadar. Novalja was given to the community and diocese of Rab by Croatian King Petar Krešimir IV. From the 12th to 14th centuries, Novalja, along with other Dalmatian towns and islands, was fiercely contested between the Republic of Venice and the Croatian-Hungarian rulers. For four centuries, from the start of the 15th century, it was held by Venice until Venice lost its independence. Austria and France then fought over the Dalmatian area, and victory was won by the Austrians.

The island passed from Austria to the Kingdom of Yugoslavia after World War I and then to the Independent State of Croatia (1941–1945). After the Second World War, it returned to Yugoslavia, and when this broke up, it became part of the new state of Croatia. Unusually, the island is divided between two counties, with Novalja and Stara Novalja being part of the northern Lika-Senj County.

== Population ==
Town of Novalja: Population trends 1857–2021
v

population	1024	1187	1610	1876	2151	2641	2641	3362	3799	3779	3533	3384	3069	3175	3335	3663	3680
	1857	1869	1880	1890	1900	1910	1921	1931	1948	1953	1961	1971	1981	1991	2001	2011	2021

Sources: Croatian Bureau of Statistics publications

=== Settlements ===
There are 12 settlements in the Town of Novalja and they include (population as of 2021):

- Caska, population 24
- Dubac-Varsan, population 6
- Gajac, population 86
- Jakišnica, population 118
- Kustići, population 138
- Lun, population 148
- Metajna, population 253
- Novalja, population 2415
- Potočnica, population 8
- Stara Novalja, population 281
- Vidalići, population 23
- Zubovići, population 180

== Economy ==
After the first geological survey of the region, the initial verdict of Mamužić and Sokač was that small bauxite pockets at the Cretaceous-Paleogene boundary were present across the entire studied area, including on Maun, but apart from those at Novalja, no deposits were marked on the map because they were thought to be economically insignificant.

== Gallery ==
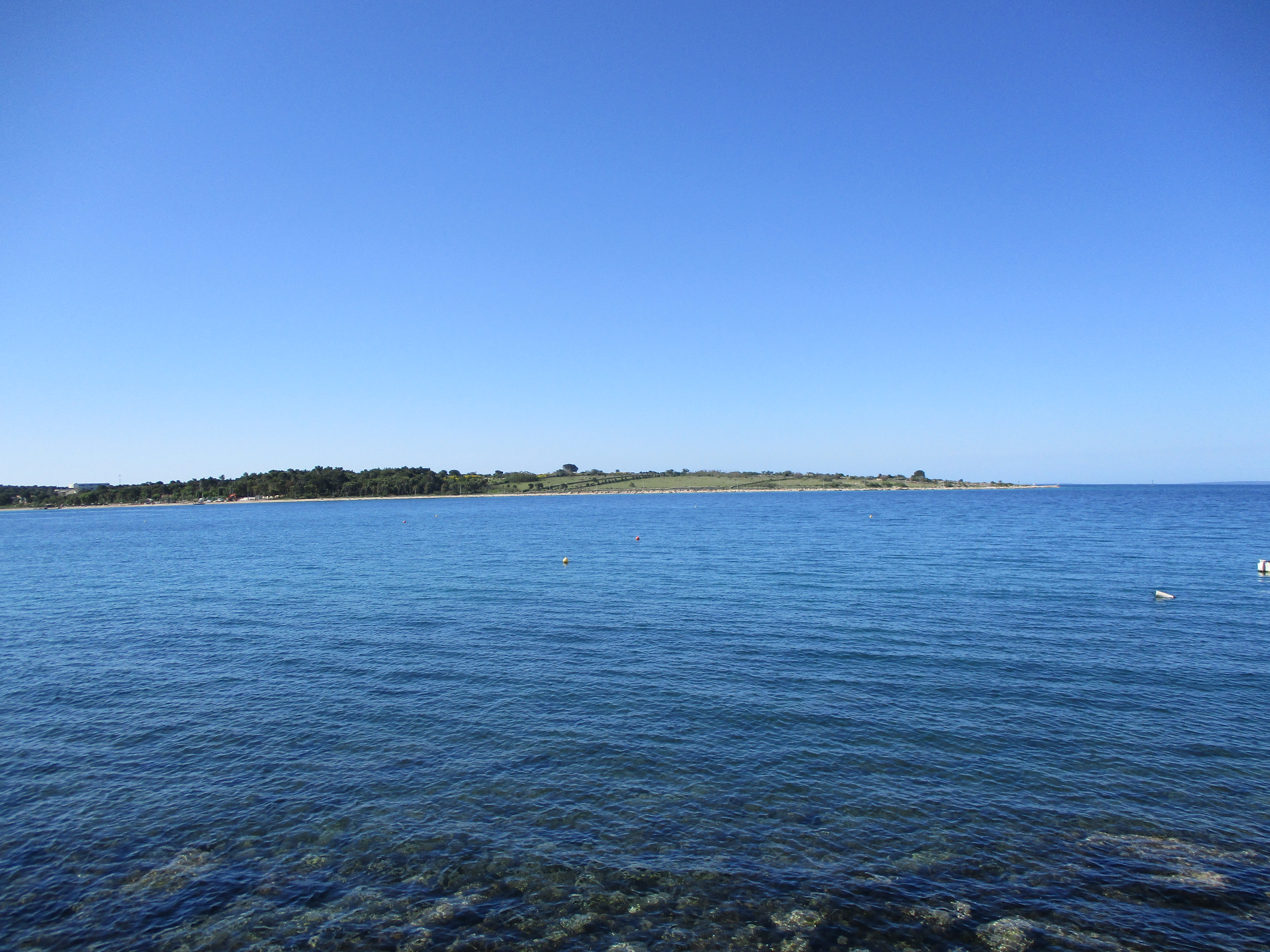

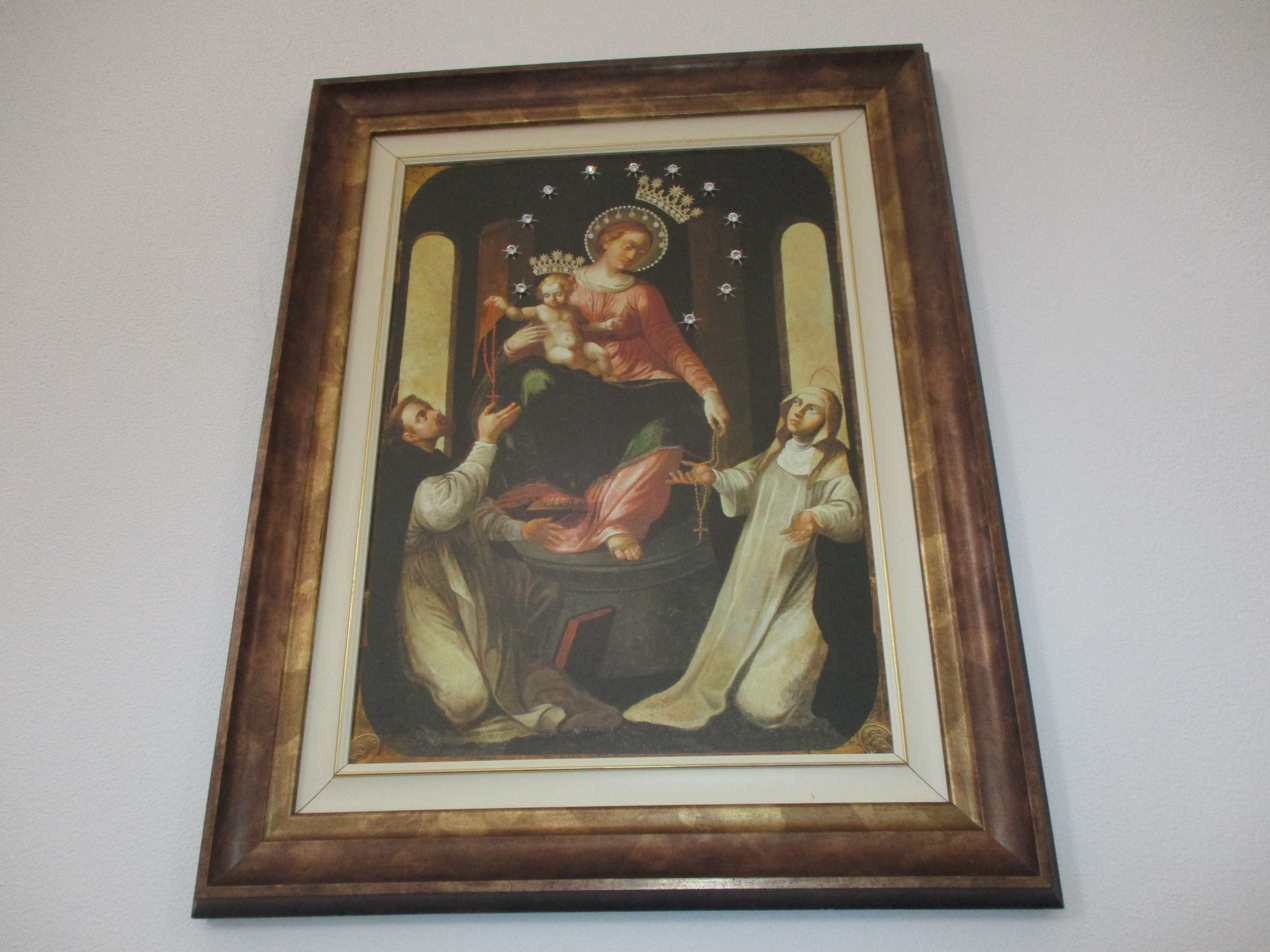

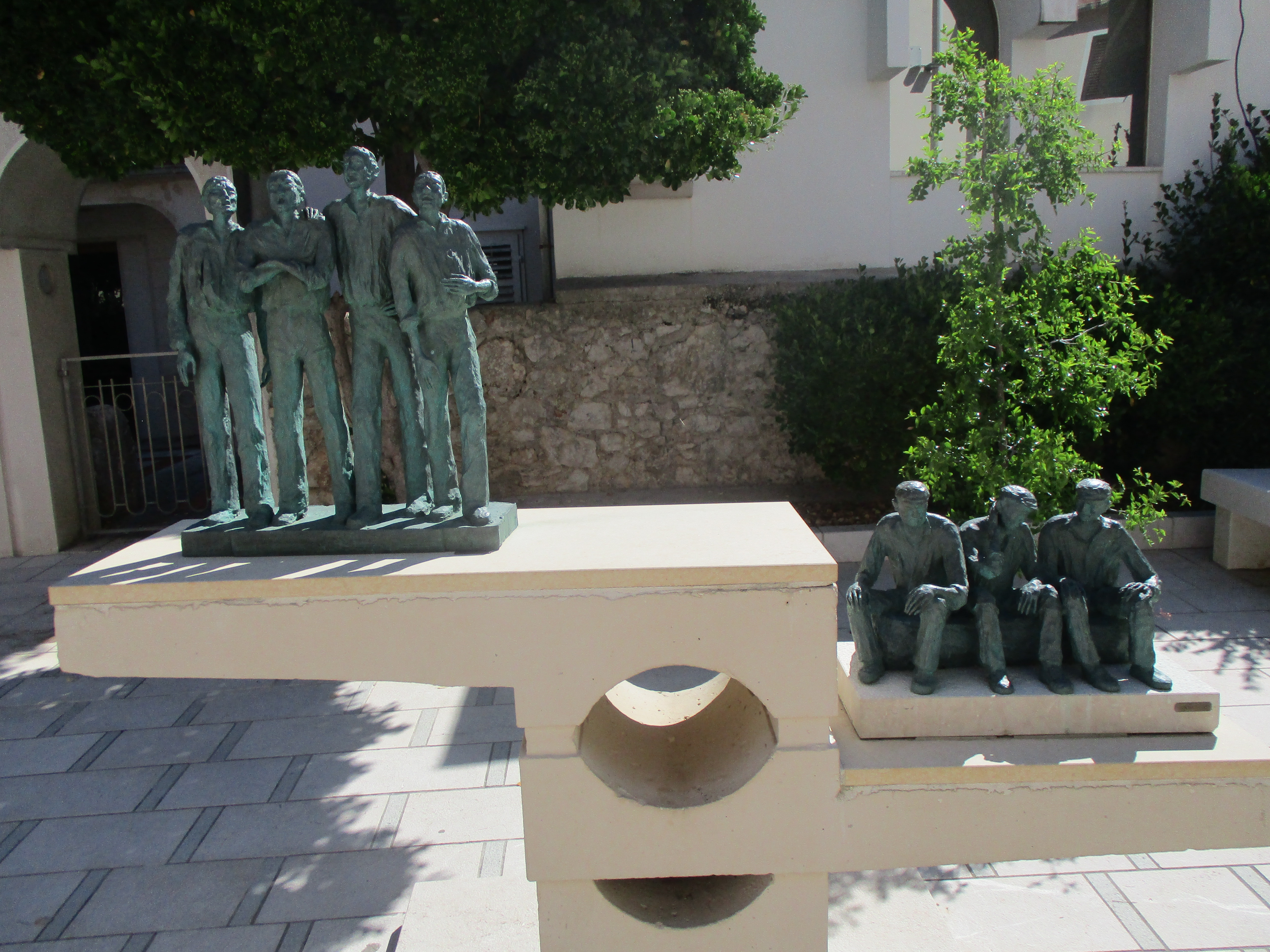

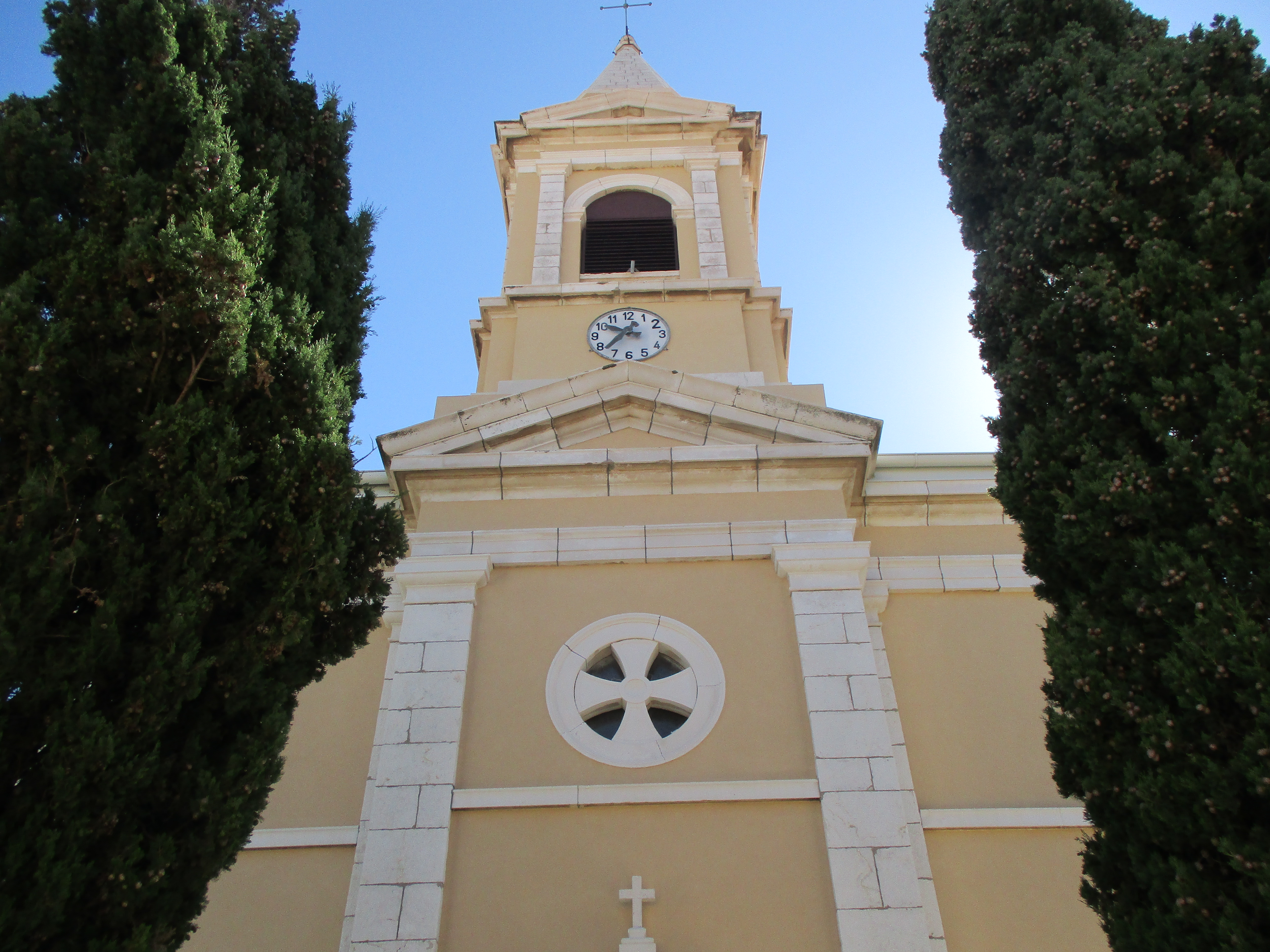

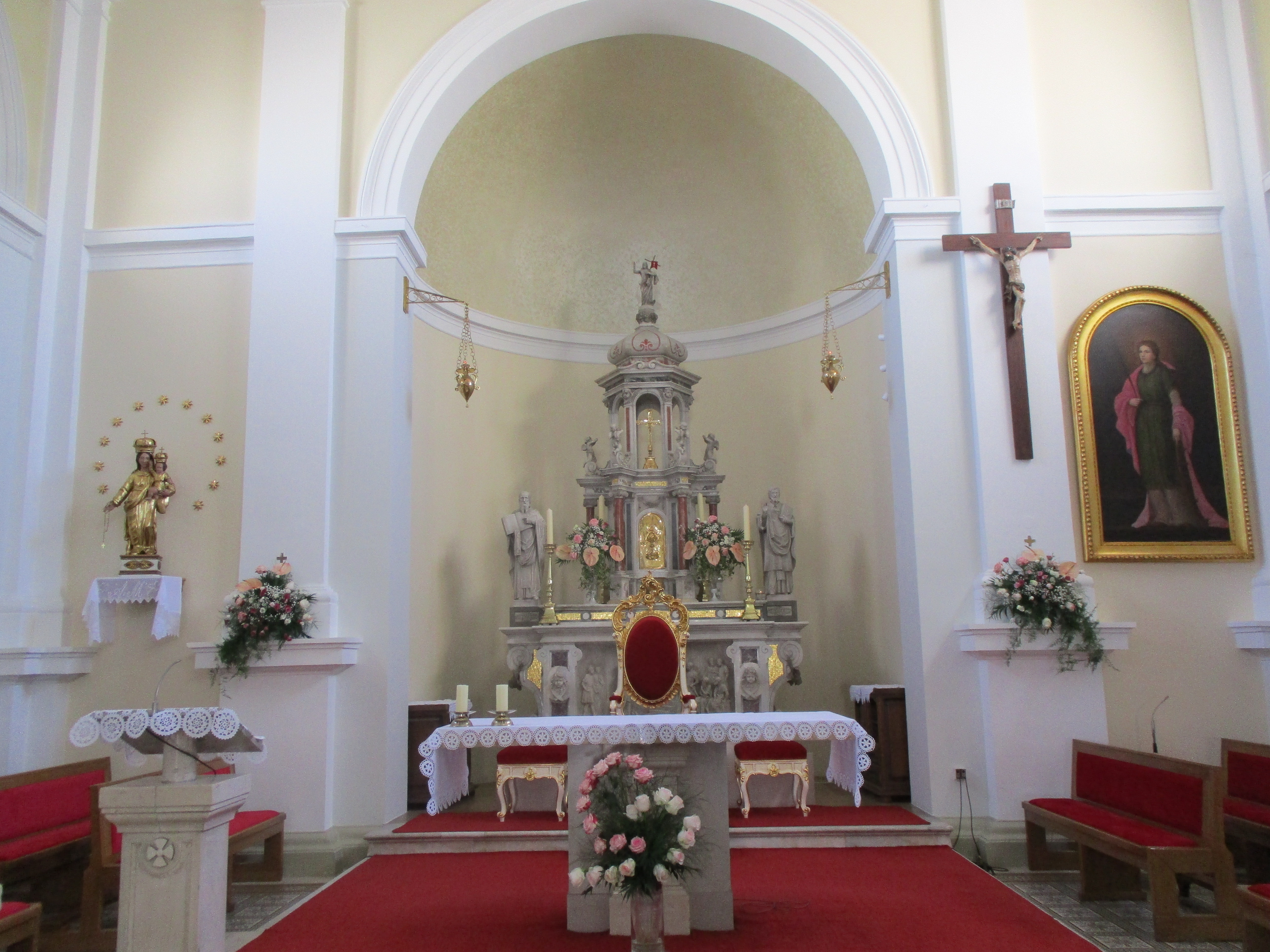

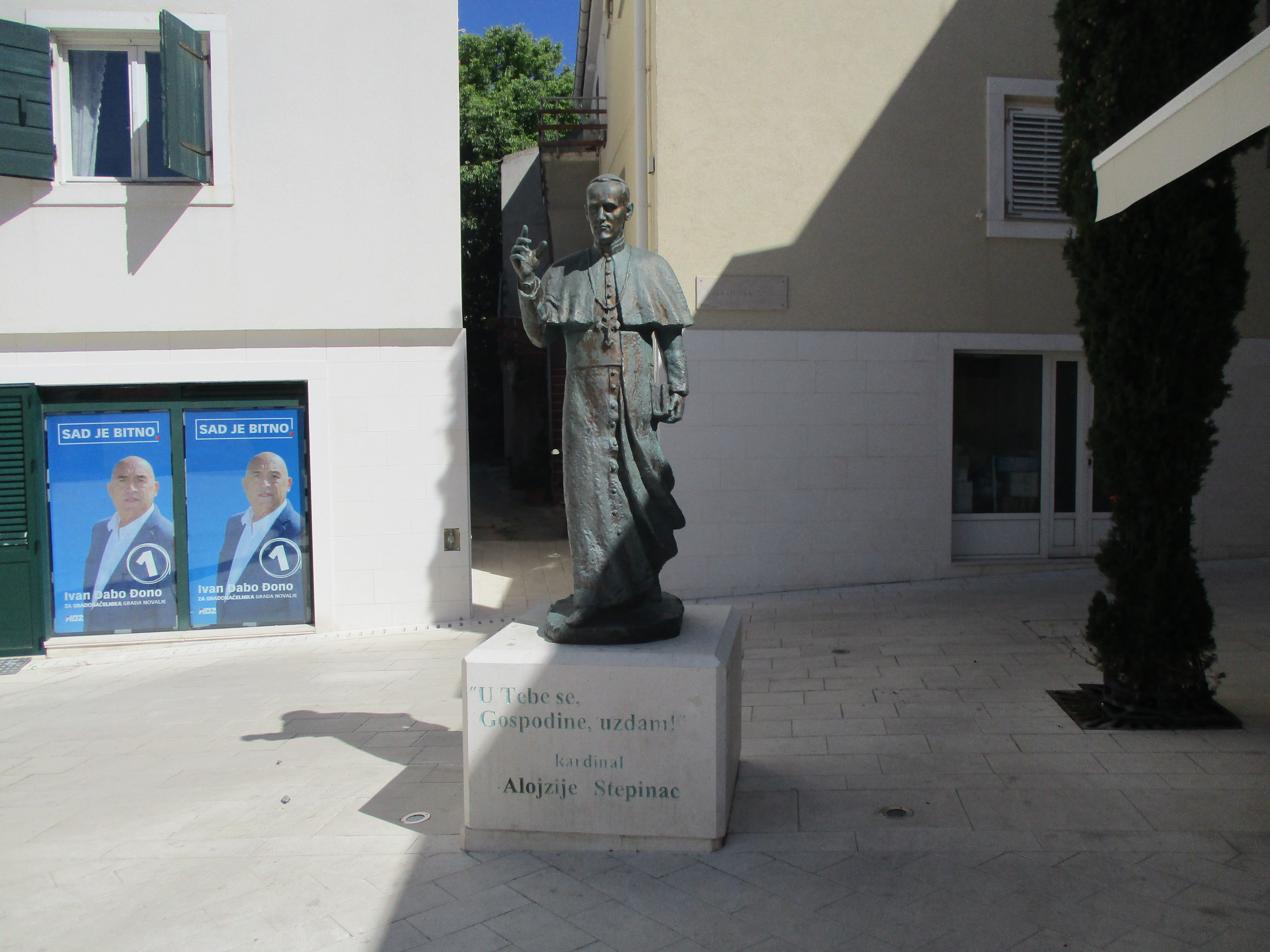

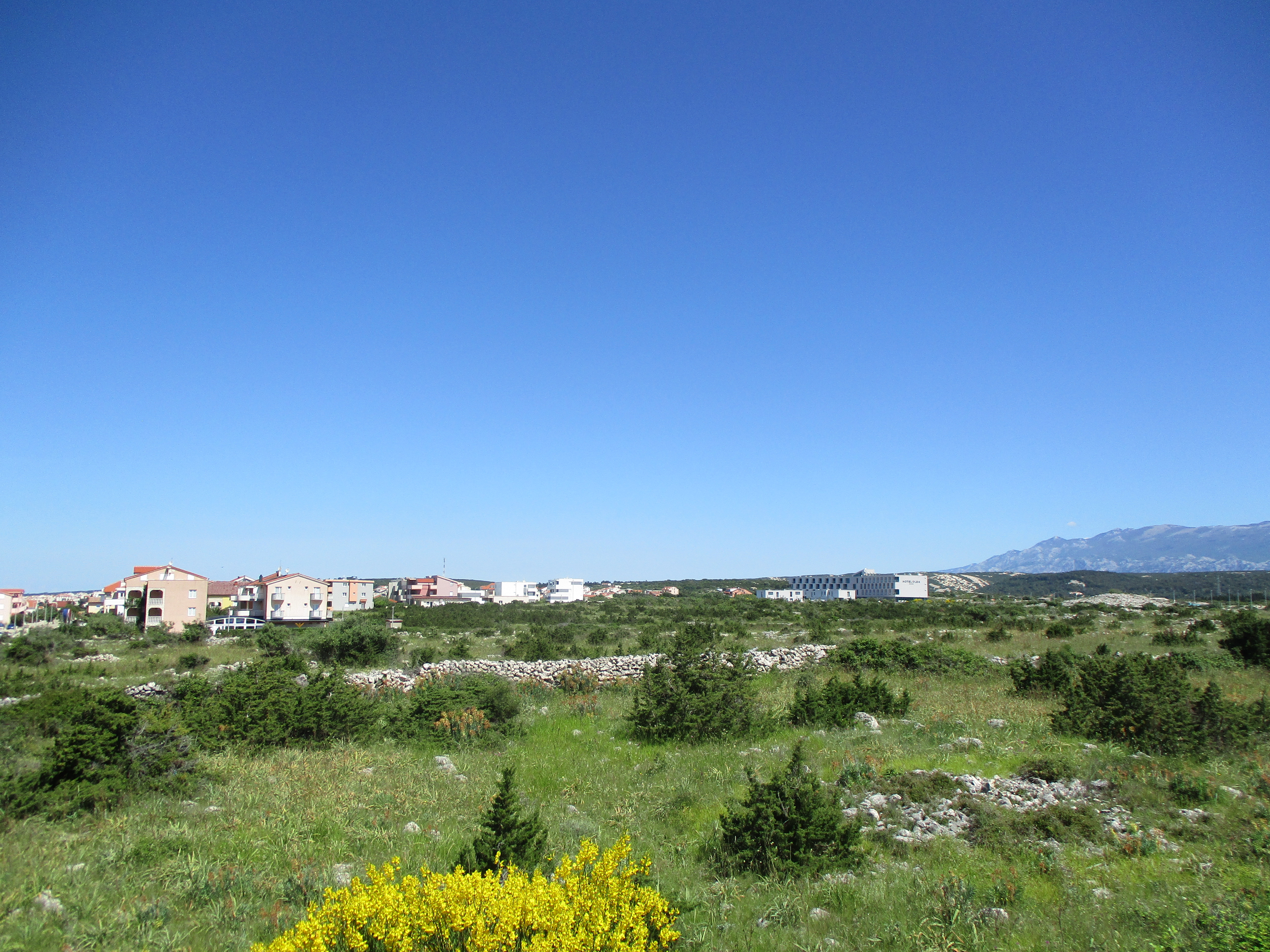

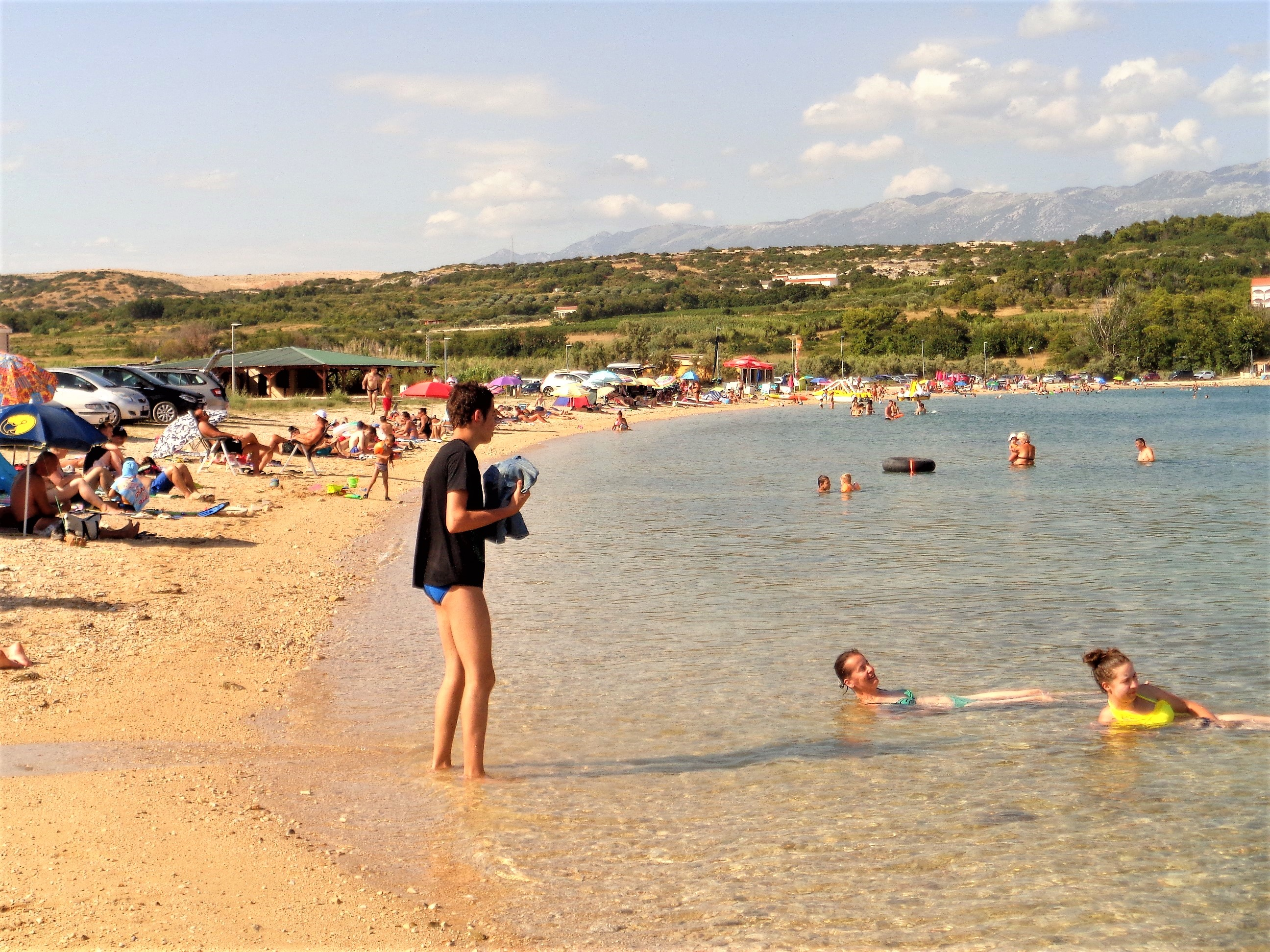

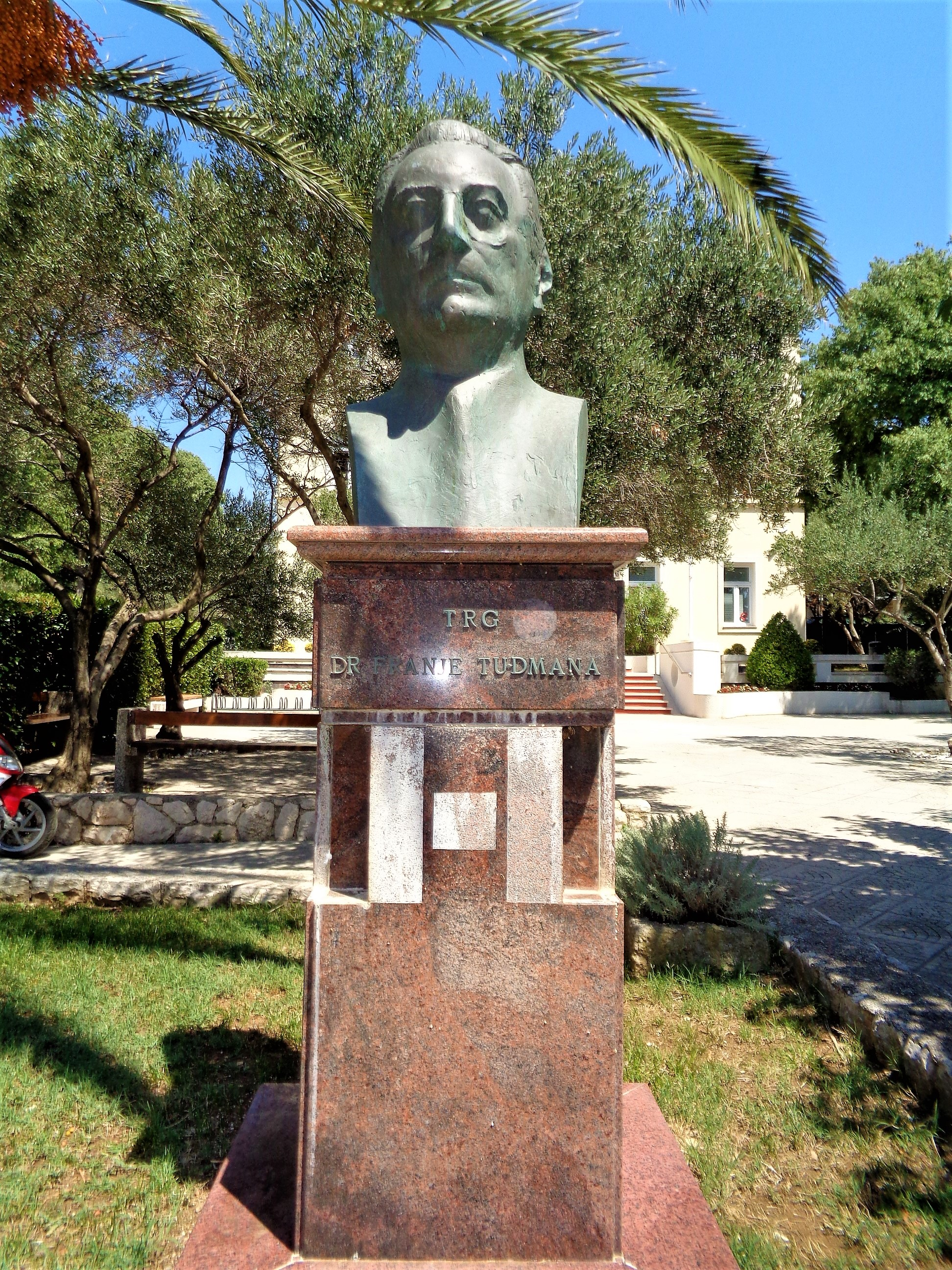

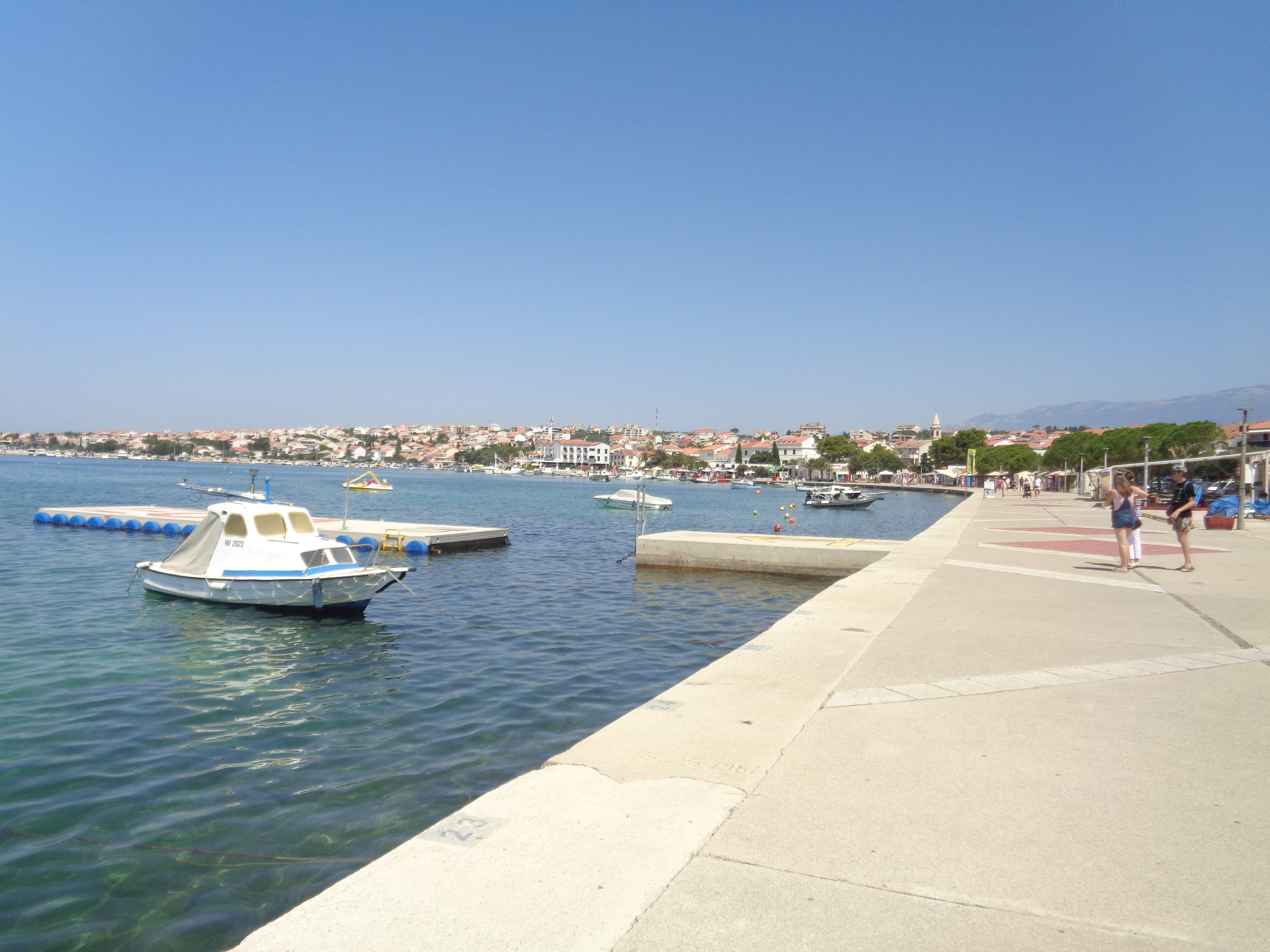

== Bibliography ==
=== Biology ===
- Šašić, Martina; Nahirnić, Ana; Tarmann, Gerhard M. (2016-12-31). "Zygaenidae (Lepidoptera) in the Lepidoptera collections of the Croatian Natural History Museum". Natura Croatica: Periodicum Musei Historiae Naturalis Croatici. 25 (2): 233–248. doi:10.20302/NC.2016.25.19. eISSN 1848-7386.

=== Geology ===
- Mamužić, P.; Sokač, B. (1973). Osnovna geološka karta SFRJ 1:100 000: Tumač za listove Molat L 33−138 i Silba L 33−126 [Basic Geological Map of SFRY 1:100 000: Legend for the sheets Molat L 33−138 and Silba L 33−126]. Zagreb: Geološki zavod.
- Šebečić, Berislav; Šinkovec, Boris; Trutin, Mladen (1999-12-04). "Donjopaleogenski boksiti Vinišća, Ugljana, Silbe i Oliba" [Lower Paleogene Bauxites of Vinišće, Ugljan, Silba and Olib]. Rudarsko-geološko-naftni zbornik (in Serbo-Croatian). 11 (1): 17–26. ISSN 0353-4529.
