= List of Glagolitic manuscripts (1700–1799) =

This is a list of manuscripts written in the Glagolitic script in the 18th century.

== List ==
Light red represents manuscripts with Glagolitic only in inclusions or paratext.
Pale red represents mixed manuscripts with Glagolitic as a main script.

| Type | Abbreviation | Date | Designation | Library | Place of origin | Folia | Dimensions | Columns and rows | Notes | Scans |
|---|---|---|---|---|---|---|---|---|---|---|
| deaths | | 1700–1802, 1805–1837 | br. 1040 | DaZd | Sestrunj | 74 p | 29.8 x 10.3 cm | | | DaZd, FS |
| matricula | | 1700–1822 | | Arhiv Zadarske nadbiskupije | Vrsi | 172 p | 27.8 x 19.2 cm | | Madrikula Bratovštine sv. Mihovila 1700–1822. Glagolitic with some Latinic. Scribes: don Šime Kuštera, don Bože Kuštera. | |
| | | 1700 (March 4) | Spisi Ninske biskupije, kut. 1, br. 87/88 | Arhiv Zadarske nadbiskupije | Nin | | | | Decree of bishop Jure Parčić. Latin and Glagolitic versions. | |
| | | 1700 (April 8) | Spisi Ninske biskupije, kut. 1, br. 89 | Arhiv Zadarske nadbiskupije | Galovac | 1 | | | Permission of fra Jerolim Škvrlić. Scribe: fra Jerolim Škvrlić. | |
| | | 1700 (April 27) | Spisi Ninske biskupije, kut. 1, br. 90 | Arhiv Zadarske nadbiskupije | Nin | 1 | | | Decree of bishop Juraj Parčić. | |
| | | 1700 (May 6) | Spisi Ninske biskupije, kut. 1, br. 91 | Arhiv Zadarske nadbiskupije | Vinjerac | | | | Scribe: pop Petar Milohnić parish priest of Poljica. Italian and Glagolitic. | |
| letter | | 1700 (August 3) | II br. 225 | Šibenik (Gradski muzej) | Zlarin, Sukošan | | | | Pismo Mike Manoša. Scribe: don Pave Grdović. | |
| | | 1700 (September 24) | Spisi Ninske biskupije, kut. 1, br. 92 | Arhiv Zadarske nadbiskupije | Nin | | | | Decree of knez Fran Bon. | |
| | | 1700 (December 14) | Spisi Ninske biskupije, kut. 1, br. 93 | Arhiv Zadarske nadbiskupije | Šibenik | | | | Latin with one Glagolitic line, possibly by Mate Rukavina who wrote the Latin text. | |
| legal | | 1700 (about) | | Bogović (dubašljanski župni arhiv) | Krk (town) | 1 | 27 x 29 cm | 1 co | Po zapovijedi kneza Ivana VII. Frankapana određuju se granice posjeda crkve Sv. Andrije u Dubašnici koje je knez Ivan daje na upravu nekom Juriću uz obvezu godišnjih podavanja. Original dated 11 April 1454 lost. Survives in transcription from about 1700, possibly a translation from Italian according to Ivšić. An Italian translation does exist, dated 1717. Bibliography: | |
| documents | | 1701–1830 | R 6330 | NSK | Krk | 98 | | | Privatno-pravne isprave i spisi obitelji Bajčić, Brusić i dr. Glagolitic and Latinic. Includes multiple manuscripts. | NSK, GHR |
| | | 1701 (April 26) | Spisi Ninske biskupije, kut. 2, br. 1/2 | Arhiv Zadarske nadbiskupije | Nin | 2 | | | Decree of bishop Juraj Parčić in Italian and Glagolitic versions. | |
| | | 1702–1795 | HR–DAZD–359 (Obitelj Lantana collection) kut. 62 sign. 1047 | DaZd | | 26 | | | Proglasi mletačkih vlasti koji se odnose na obveze kolona. Latinic with Glagolitic on f. 3. Part of Lantana family archive. Acquired by Državni arhiv u Zadru 1945. | |
| | | 1702 (January 15) | Spisi Ninske biskupije, kut. 2, br. 3 | Arhiv Zadarske nadbiskupije | Nin | 1 | | | Decree of bishop Juraj Parčić. | |
| | | 1702 (March 18, 20) | Spisi Ninske biskupije, kut. 2, br. 4 | Arhiv Zadarske nadbiskupije | Nin, Vir, Privlaka | | | | Decree of bishop Juraj Parčić. | |
| | | 1702 (March 28) | Spisi Ninske biskupije, kut. 2, br. 6/7 | Arhiv Zadarske nadbiskupije | Vir | 2 | | | Scribe: don Mikula Žintiličić parish priest of Vir, with short signatures from 1-3 other hands (one of which is Cyrillic). | |
| | | 1702 (March 29) | Spisi Ninske biskupije, kut. 2, br. 8/9 | Arhiv Zadarske nadbiskupije | Zadar, Ražanac | 2 | | | Decree of Alviž Mocenigo (in Italian original and Glagolitic translation), with Glagolitic confirmation from Ražanac. | |
| | | 1702 (June 14, 1 January 1703) | Spisi Ninske biskupije, kut. 2, br. 5 | Arhiv Zadarske nadbiskupije | | | | | Decree of bishop Juraj Parčić. Parčić's decree in Italian, confirmation of don "Manton" on 1 January 1703 in Glagolitic. | |
| | | 1702 (April 13) | Spisi Ninske biskupije, kutija 2 (džepić), br. 1a | Arhiv Zadarske nadbiskupije | Nin | 1 | | | Decrees of the see of Nin. | |
| | | 1702 | | ? | Glavotok | 16 | | | Šumarii harvatski od svih pisam mostira svete Marie od Glavotoka. Scribe: fra Gabriel Bolmarčić. Lost as of 1960. | |
| | | 1702 (after) | R-139 | Rijeka (Sveučilišna knjižnica) | | | | | A Glagolitic poem about Judas written on an empty page at the end of a manuscript of the 1702 Franjo Glavinić ook Czvit szvetih (sign. R-139). The book was acquired by the Sveučilišna knjižnica of Rijeka in 1956 by purchase from the family of Ivan Šimanić of Baška Draga. | |
| curses | | 1703 | IV a 128 | Arhiv HAZU | Sali | 14 | 19.4 x 15.4 cm | | Zakletve protive štetočina i zla oblaka. Scribe: Ivan Rudić of Sali f. 1–12, a second hand f. 13. One photograph in Štefanić 1970. Bibliography: | |
| matricula | | 1703–1765 | | Arhiv Zadarske nadbiskupije | Pašman | 28 p | 29 x 19 cm | | Madrikula Bratovštine sv. Marka 1703–1765. | |
| | | 1703–1774 | 17 | Dobrinj (župni ured) | Dobrinj | 108 | 31 x 21 cm | | Knjiga bratovštine sv. Jelisavete ili Gospe od Pohođenja. Italian with some Glagolitic 1705–1774. Glagolitic scribes: pop Mikula Prašnić kapelan, pop Šimun Elinović kapelan in 1745 and 1749, Ivan Volarić, Mikula Brusić, Petar Petriš, others. | |
| | | 1703 (January 8) | Spisi Ninske biskupije, kut. 2, br. 10 | Arhiv Zadarske nadbiskupije | Nin, Zaton | 1 | | | Decree of Marc'Antonio Corner, count of Nin. In Italian, with Glagolitic confirmation from Mihe Azin, Grgo Lazan and Šime Pavlović in Zaton. | |
| | | 1703 (January 9) | Spisi Ninske biskupije, kut. 2, br. 11 | Arhiv Zadarske nadbiskupije | Nin | 1 | | | Decree of bishop Juraj Parčić. | |
| | | 1703 (January 9) | Spisi Ninske biskupije, kut. 2, br. 16 | Arhiv Zadarske nadbiskupije | Nin | 1 | | | Decree of bishop Juraj Parčić. | |
| souls | | 1703 (October 5) | Spisi Ninske biskupije, kut. 2, br. 12/13 | Arhiv Zadarske nadbiskupije | Vrsi | | | | | |
| deaths | | 1704–1949 | | Glavotok | Glavotok | 86 | 37.5 x 27 cm | | Knjiga ukapanja mrtvaca u crkvi sv. Marije. Glagolitic to 25 December 1859 then Italian (but 7 entries Glagolitic with Latinic ductus in 1864) then Latinic Croatian from 1864. | |
| matricula | | 1704–1800 | | Arhiv Zadarske nadbiskupije | Sukošan | 100 p | 42.5 x 15.5 cm | 1 co | Glagoljska Skula sv. Kasijana. Glagolitic to 1785 then Latinic, with some Italian. | PB |
| | | 1704–1709 | sign. VIII 281 | Arhiv HAZU | Vrbnik | 166 | 30 x 21 cm | | Protokol notara Petra Petriša 1704–1709. Was part of Jerko Gršković collection in Vrbnik. | |
| | | 1704–1715 | Osor collection XLV | Krk | Krk, Osor | ~700 | | | Prove di stato libero. Latinic with 20 Glagolitic legal acts as supplement, mainly from Krk. | |
| | | 1704 (April 18) | Spisi Ninske biskupije, kut. 2, br. 17 | Arhiv Zadarske nadbiskupije | Nin | | | | Letter of Martin Dragolović bishop of Nin. Glagolitic but day is written in Cyrillic. | |
| legal | | 1704 (October 30) | Glagolitica II-47 | Zadar | | | | | Zadarski knez zabranjuje seljacima Dobre Poljane pasti marvu po zemljištu gospođe Marije, udove kneza Antuna Fafunića. Italian translation on reverse. | IzSt (2008) |
| | | 1704 (November 1) | Spisi Ninske biskupije, kut. 2, br. 18 | Arhiv Zadarske nadbiskupije | 1 | | | | Scribe: don Jive Rudić. | |
| christenings | | 1705–1739 | | Arhiv Zadarske nadbiskupije | Dračevac Zadarski | 12 | 28.5 x 10 cm | | | |
| receipts and expenditures | | 1705–1746 | | Monastery of Saint Mary Magdalene in Porat, Krk | Dubašnica, Krk | 301 | 22 cm | | | |
| | | 1705–1713 | | Zagreb (Arhiv Provincijalata franjevaca trećoredaca) | Zaglav | 94 | 29.5 x 9.4 cm | | Vječne mise Samostana sv. Mihovila. | |
| marriage, christenings, confirmation | | 1706–1781, 1706–1781, 1696–1781 | IX 17 | Arhiv HAZU | Dubašnica, Krk | 199 | 30 x 21 cm | | | FS |
| marriages | | 1706–1765 | | Murvica (župni ured) | Murvica | 86 p | 29.5 x 9.6 cm | | | |
| marriages | | 1706–1817 | IX 4 | Arhiv HAZU | Novalja, Dotal | 96 | 28.5 x 20.3 cm | | Novalja 1706–1817 and Dotal 1706–1746. Glagolitic to 24 November 1737 then Latinic then Glagolitic 7 March 1760 to 24 January 1768 then Latinic. | FS |
| ledger | | 1706–1807 | | Brbinj (župni ured) | Brbinj | 232 p | 28.7 x 10.4 cm | | Completely Glagolitic. Lost as of 2015. | |
| | | 1706 (May 15) | II br. 226 | Šibenik (Gradski muzej) | Jezera (by Tisno) | | | | Štima Petra Osaranova. Scribe: don Pave Petrinov. | |
| | | 1706 (August 25) | II br. 240 | Šibenik (Gradski muzej) | Prvić | | | | Matter of the Franciscans concerning Anton Livić and others. Scribe: unknown. | |
| | | 1706 (November 21) | Spisi Ninske biskupije, kut. 2, br. 19 | Arhiv Zadarske nadbiskupije | Diklo | 1 | | | Scribe: don Šime Meštrić vice kapelan Dikla. | |
| notes | | 1707–1829 | | Vrgada (župni ured) | Vrgada | | | | Inside a copy of the 1707 Misse za umervšie there are several Glagolitic notes. Parish priest Martin Mihić wrote a Latinic note of purchase in 1829 from Šime Jurin. The surname Jurin is synonymous with Krpetić, a family from which several priests came on Vrgada. | |
| registers | | 1707–1727 | | Vranj in Istria | | | | | Parish records from Vranj. | |
| | | 1707?-1776 | inv. br. 24 | Poljica (župni ured) | Poljica | 303 | 31 x 22 cm | | Kapitulska knjiga: isprave. Glagolitic and Italian but Glagolitic even in 1776. | |
| | | 1707 (February 20) | Spisi Ninske biskupije, kut. 2, br. 20 | Arhiv Zadarske nadbiskupije | Vlašići | 1 | | | Don Dunat Šegota parohijan od Vlašića piše viru Bari Malateštiću iz Dobrinja. Includes the Latinic signature of the bishop. | |
| | | 1707 (May 14) | Spisi Ninske biskupije, kutija 2 (džepić), br. 2a | Arhiv Zadarske nadbiskupije | Nin | 1 | | | Decrees of Martin Dragolović bishop of Nin. | IzSt (2009) |
| | | 1708 (April 3) | IV 80/55 | Arhiv HAZU | Zadar archipelago | 1 | 20 x 10 cm | | Procjena štete. | |
| | | 1708 (June 12) | Spisi Ninske biskupije, kut. 2, br. 21 | Arhiv Zadarske nadbiskupije | Nin | 1 | | | Decree of bishop Martin Dragolović to don Anton Matešić. | |
| | | 1708 (July 8) | Spisi Ninske biskupije, kut. 2, br. 22 | Arhiv Zadarske nadbiskupije | Nin | 1 | | | Decree of bishop Martin Dragolović. | |
| homiliary | | 1707?- | Ante Marija Strgačić collection (HR–DAZD–373) | DaZd | Brbinj | 86 p | 20.3 x 14.5 cm | | Propovijedi popa Antona Šegote, parohijana brbinjskoga. Two joined notebooks bound in a fragment of a Glagolitic missal from the 14th-15th century written in 2 columns of 31 rows. Scribe: Anton Šegota (župnik in Brbinj 1708–1724, 1762–1763). Found in house of Ivan Bubica Zelenko in Luka. Acquired by Ante Marija Strgačić. Bibliography: | |
| | | 1709–1821 | | Arhiv Zadarske nadbiskupije | Vrgada | 363 p | 42 x 16.5 cm | | Imenik članova Skule sv. Ružarija. Glagolitic to 1821 then Latinic. Bibliography: | GL, PB |
| receipts and expenditures | | 1709–1812 | | DaZd | Sali | 37 | 21 x 21.5 cm | | Knjiga troškova i dohotka obitelji Vodopija. Unbound. Scribes: don Anton Vodopija (1709–1724), others, don Petar Vodopija (1767–1789), don Ivan Vodopija (1777–1812). | |
| letter | | 1709 (January 7) | II br. 227 | Šibenik (Gradski muzej) | Jezera (by Tisno) | | | | Pismo Pave Mihatova. Scribe: don Pave Petrinov. | |
| inventory | | 1709 (February 2) | II br. 228 | Šibenik (Gradski muzej) | Tisno | | | | Ventarij dobra pokojnoga Mate Munjina. Scribe: don Mate Maračin. | |
| | | 1709 (April 18) | Spisi Ninske biskupije, kut. 2, br. 23 | Arhiv Zadarske nadbiskupije | Nin | 1 | | | Instructions of vicar Andrija Milić to don Mate Ugarković. | |
| | | 1709 (June 25) | Spisi Ninske biskupije, kut. 2, br. 24 | Arhiv Zadarske nadbiskupije | Nin | 1 | | | Instructions of vicar Andrija Milić. | |
| matricula | | 1710–1892 | | Arhiv Zadarske nadbiskupije | Bibinje | 468 p | 36.8 x 25.8 cm | 1 co | Matrikula Gospe Začeća u Bibinjama. Glagolitic to 1805 then Latinic. | GUZ, PB |
| | | 1710–1750 | br. 7 | Vrbnik (župni ured) | Vrbnik | 257 | 31 x 21 cm | | Kapitulska knjiga instrumenata i drugo. Completely Glagolitic. | |
| legal | | 1711–1758 | R 3345 | NSK | 20 | | | | Devet privatno-pravnih listina iz Omišlja. 10 separate documents. | |
| protocol | | 1711–1716, 1720 | br. 36 | Vrbnik (župni ured) | Vrbnik | 201 | 28.3 x 20 cm | | Protokol notara Petra Petriša. | |
| protocol | | 1711–1718 | Glagolitica 3.3, 4.3 | Croatian State Archives | Krk (town) | 211 | | | Protokol notara Antonija Zubranich. Fire damage. | IzSt (2008) |
| matricula | | 1711–1808 | | Zavičajni muzej u Biogradu | Polača | 134 p | 32 x 22.5 cm | | Madrikula bratovštine ss. Kuzme i Damjana u Polači. Brotherhood founded 11 January 1711. Glagolitic and Latinic. Facsimile published 2013. | |
| will | | 1711 (September 21) | II br. 231 | Šibenik (Gradski muzej) | Betina | | | | Taštament Jele Tomasove. Scribe: pop Mate Juroš. Photograph in Šupuk 1957. | |
| | | 1699, 1711, 1713, 1720, 1740, 1745 | M. v 10b | Trsat (Riznica franjevačkog samostana) | Pašman, Pakoštane | | | | Glagolitic notes of ownership with dates and an aborted attempt also in Glagolitic, in addition to the names of deceased priests and monks. They are on leaves inserted into M. v 10b, the Trsat copy of the 1635 printed Ispravnik za erei. Glagolitic scribes: don Grga Zoić of Punta Pašmana to 1 March 1709, then don Mike Ljubanović of Punta Pašmana to 8 August 1750, then one other (probably the nephew of Mike Ljubanović, likewise a parish priest of Pašman, owner at least until 1769). Later, in 1826 and probably 1833 the book belonged to Matija Kostera of Pašman. Photograph of part published in Deković 1986, who had first noticed the Glagolitic notes while the book was being transferred from the library to the archive of the Franciscan monastery of Trsat in April 1985. | |
| christenings | | 1712–1823 | br. 1046 | Državni arhiv Zadar | Silba | 648 p | 29 x 19.9 cm | 1 co | Glagolitic to 1808 then Latinic. and Italian, with some Latinic before 1808. | DaZd, FS |
| deaths | | 1712–1839 | | Arhiv Zadarske nadbiskupije | Visočane | 98 p | 28.5 x 10 cm | 1 co | Latinic with Glagolitic on pages 25, 26, 28. | GUZ, PB |
| deaths | | 1712–1740 | br. 1382 | Državni arhiv Zadar | Ugljan (town) | 108 p | 29.2 x 9.5 cm | 1 co | Once kept in Olib (župski ured), acquired by JAZU then by Državni arhiv in Zadar. | DaZd, FS |
| matricula | | 1712–1836 | | Arhiv Zadarske nadbiskupije | Božava | 258 p | 41 x 14.5 cm | 1 co | Madrikula s. Nedilje. Glagolitic with some Latinic. Also includes Latinic ledger for 1867–1869. Lost as of 2015. | GUZ, PB |
| matricula | | 1712–1810 | | Arhiv Zadarske nadbiskupije | Veli Iž | 184 p | 32 x 14 cm | 1 co | Madrikula Gospe Luzarija. Glagolitic excepting a few Latinic notes. | GUZ, PB |
| | | 1712 (March 4) | Spisi Ninske biskupije, kut. 2, br. 25/26 | Arhiv Zadarske nadbiskupije | Zaton | 2 | | | Scribe: pop Šimun Gerković. | |
| council | | 1712 (27 September – 8 December) | | Krk (arhiv bivšeg Staroslavenskog instituta) | | 144 | 30.7 x 21.2 cm | | Svetosveti koncilij tridentinski. Scribe: Anton Franki. | |
| christenings | | 1713–1825 | | Arhiv Zadarske nadbiskupije | Bibinje | 354 p | 29.4 x 9.9 cm | 1 co | Glagolitic to 1805 inclusive then Latinic. Page 188 includes Cyrillic including an abecedary. | GUZ, PB |
| deaths | | 1713–1846 | | Arhiv Zadarske nadbiskupije | Silba | 178 p | 28.5 x 20.5 cm | 1 co | Glagolitic and Latinic. | GUZ, PB, bgcolor=#F2CEEC|FS |
| deaths | | 1713–1816 | | Arhiv Zadarske biskupije | Bibinje | 234 p | 29 x 10 cm | 1 co | Glagolitic to 1802–1805 then Latinic. Includes Cyrillic abecedary on page 188. | PB |
| matricula | | 1713–1850 | | Arhiv Zadarske nadbiskupije | Kožino | 268 p | 31.2 x 20.8 cm | | Madrikula Bratovštine Svetog Duha. Latinic with Glagolitic on cover (by Mikula Fižulić of Drage on Dugi otok, don Gašpar Šarić in Murvica and don Kadija of Turanj), page 17 (year 1770), page 260. | GL |
| | | 1713–1738 | inv. br. 4 | Baška (župni ured) | Baška | 183 | 38.5 x 27.5 cm | | Kopijalna knjiga o pravima bašćanskog klera. Part Glagolitic part Italian. Scribes were notaries. | |
| | | 1713–1717 | | Zagreb (Arhiv Provincijalata franjevaca trećoredaca) | Zaglav | 100 | 25.1 x 9.6 cm | | Vječne mise Samostana sv. Mihovila 1713–1717. | |
| will | | 1713 (April 1) | II br. 229 | Šibenik (Gradski muzej) | Tisno | | | | Taštamenat Stipana Žarkova. Scribe: don Mate Maračin. | |
| will | | 1713 (June 19) | II br. 230 | Šibenik (Gradski muzej) | Tisno | | | | Taštamenat Šimuna sina pokojnoga Jivana Muhića Scribe: don Mate Maračin. | |
| | | 1713 (November 12) | Spisi Ninske biskupije, kut. 2, br. 27 | Arhiv Zadarske nadbiskupije | Dinjiška | 1 | | | Don Jakov Stupčić parohijan Dinjiške čini viru Mati sinu pokojnoga Antona Stupčića i Kati kćeri Jakova Vulinovića. | |
| mass register | | 1713 | Arhiv obitelji Garanjin-Fanfonja, glagolitika | Državni arhiv u Splitu | Veli Iž | 4 | 20 x 7.5 cm | | Popis misa ke ima reći parokijan od Iža. | |
| marriages | | 1714–1848 | br. 1053 | Državni arhiv Zadar | Silba | 306 p | 29 x 19.5 cm | 1 co | Glagolitic to 1808 then Latin and Italian. | DaZd, FS |
| marriages | | 1714–1825 | | Arhiv Zadarske nadbiskupije | Bibinje | 164 p | 29.7 x 10 cm | 1 co | Glagolitic to 1800 then Latinic. | GUZ, PB |
| | | 1714–1824 | inv. br. 3 | Draga Bašćanska (župni ured) | Draga Bašćanska | 235 | 20 x 14.5 cm | | Knjiga bratovštine duša od čistilišta. Glagolitic as late as 1805 from pop Bare Tomašić then Latinic from 1807, with earliest Latinic 1751. Also Italian. | |
| | | 1714 (December 16) | Spisi Ninske biskupije, kut. 2, br. 28 | Arhiv Zadarske nadbiskupije | | 1 | | | Scribe: don Mate Ugarković. Glagolitic but his signature is in Cyrillic. | |
| will | | 1714 | fond Oporuke iz kancelarije zadarskih knezova | Državni arhiv u Zadru | Vrana | | | | | |
| deed | | 1715 (June 25) | IV a 80/19 | Arhiv HAZU | Sali | 2 | 20 x 14 cm | | Ugovor o kupnji Dunata i Šimuna Rudina. Scribe: Šime Vodopija (died 1727). | |
| | | 1715 (July 8, 14, 15, 16) | Spisi Ninske biskupije, kut. 2, br. 29/30 | Arhiv Zadarske nadbiskupije | Nin, Zaton, Vir | 2 | | | Circular letter to Zaton, Privlaka and Vis. Italian with Glagolitic confirmations. | |
| | | 1715 | I a 34 | Arhiv HAZU | | 229 | 14.5 x 10 cm | | Priručnik moralne teologije (skripta) Barića Mandića. Scribes: one hand f. 2-57, the varied hand of Barić Mandić of Baška (1693–1762) everything else. Note on f. 299v not by either hand. Mandić wrote it studying under Ivan Tomašić in Krk in 1715. One photograph in Štefanić 1970. | |
| deaths | | 1716–1771 | br. 703 | Državni arhiv Zadar | Olib | 195 p | 29 x 9.6 cm | 1 co | Facsimile published 2011. | DaZd |
| legal | | 1716 (May 18) | Glagolitica II-48 | HDA | Zadar | | | | Zadarski knez zabranjuje seljacima Dobre Poljane pasti marvu na zemljama gospođe braće Fafunića. Italian translation on reverse. | IzSt (2008) |
| judgement | | 1716 (October 3) | Glagolitica II-49 | HDA | Zadar | | | | Zadarski knez nalaže sucima Banja da zapovjede Mihi Mihoviloviću da se preseli iz Močira u mjesto Ljuto na školju Dobre Poljane. Italian translation on reverse. | IzSt (2008) |
| | | 1717–1831, 1868–1914 | | Glavotok | Glavotok | 16 | 30.5 x 22 cm | | Knjiga posinovljenja (1717–1831, 1869–1914), Knjiga oblačenja (1868–1903). Glagolitic to 1831 then Latinic and Italian. | |
| christenings | | 1717–1812 | | Arhiv Zadarske nadbiskupije | Vrsi | 268 p | 29.5 x 20 cm | | Glagolitic, and Cyrillic to 1721. | |
| matricula | | 1717–1807, 1857, 1857 | | Kali (župni ured) | Kali | 126 p | 29.2 x 21.5 cm | 1 co | Madrikula sv. Križa. Glagolitic to 1807 when brotherhood abolished under Napoleon, then Latin from 1857 when reestablished. One of the last manuscripts with Glagolitic to be in use for records. | GUZ, PB |
| christenings | | 1717–1824 (or 1716–1824) | | Molat (župni ured) | Molat | 384 p | 28.7 x 9.9 cm | | Glagolitic to 1817 inclusive then Latinic. | |
| christenings | | 1718–1734 | Inv. br. 919 | Državni arhiv Zadar | Prkos (Škabrnja) | 2 | 29.6 x 15 cm | | Glagolitic and Latinic. Discovered inside of the 1757–1812 christenings register of Arbanasi. | DaZd, FS |
| confirmations | | 1718–1825 | | Arhiv Zadarske nadbiskupije | Silba | 96 p | 29 x 20.5 cm | 1 co | Glagolitic to 1800 then Latinic. | GUZ, PB |
| confirmations | | 1718–1797 | | Arhiv Zadarske nadbiskupije | Olib | 61 p | 28.8 x 10 cm | 1 co | | GUZ, PB |
| | | 1718–1764 | br. 24 | Vrbnik (župni ured) | Vrbnik | 40 | 21 x 16 cm | | Knjiga bratovštine sv. Jeronima. Mostly Glagolitic with some Italian. | |
| | | 1718–1843 | br. 5 | Vrbnik (župni ured) | Vrbnik | 64 | 31 x 22 cm | | Kapitulska knjiga legata (zadušina). Completely Glagolitic except for Italian at end. Last Glagolitic entry 12 March 1843. | |
| | | 1718–1793 | 12 | Dobrinj (župni ured) | Dobrinj | 189 | 31 x 21 cm | | Knjiga bratovštine Gospe od Karmena: zadužnice. Glagolitic to 1774 then Latinic thanks to Venetian prohibition. | |
| ledger | | 1718–1744 | inv. br. 14 | Baška (župni ured) | Baška | 191 | 31.5 x 21.5 cm | | Knjiga računa kapitulskog dižmara. | |
| | | 1718 (February 23) | Spisi Ninske biskupije, kut. 2, br. 31 | Arhiv Zadarske nadbiskupije | Novigrad | 1 | | | Vira dona Mate parokijana. Latinic with Glagolitic signature. | |
| | | 1718 (February 26) | Spisi Ninske biskupije, kut. 2, br. 32 | Arhiv Zadarske nadbiskupije | Ražanac | 1 | | | Letter of don Frane Jović paroch of Ražanac to the paroch of Privlaka. Glagolitic with "Ražanac" in Cyrillic. | |
| | | 1718 (August 5) | Spisi Ninske biskupije, posebna kutija, bez signature | Arhiv Zadarske nadbiskupije | Nadin | 1 | | | Ženitbeni spis dona Ivana Milišića kurata od Nina 1718. Only the year 1718 is written in Glagolitic. | |
| | | 1718 (October 12) | Spisi Ninske biskupije, kut. 2, br. 33 | Arhiv Zadarske nadbiskupije | Popovići | 1 | | | Letter of don Filip Baričić. Scribe: Filip Baričić. | |
| | | 1718 (October 15) | Spisi Ninske biskupije, kut. 2, br. 34 | Arhiv Zadarske nadbiskupije | | 1 | | | Letter of don Pave Grdović paroch of Privlaka to the bishop of Nin. | |
| | | 1718 (October 29) | Spisi Ninske biskupije, kut. 2, br. 35 | Arhiv Zadarske nadbiskupije | | 1 | | | Letter of don Mate Dijanić paroch of Povljana on Pag to the bishop of Nin. | |
| matricula | | 1719–1820 | | Brbinj (župni ured) | Brbinj | 76 p | 28.5 x 20 cm | | Glagolitic to 1814 then Latinic. | |
| christenings, confirmations, deaths, marriages | | 1719–1757 | IX 13 | Arhiv HAZU | Dobrinj | 251 | 31 x 21 cm | | Christenings (1723–1756), deaths (1719–1756), marriages (1720–1757), confirmations (1735–1753). Parish priests Ivan Uravić (1719–1732) and Ivan Baldigare (1732–1757). | FS |
| marriages | | 1719–1810 | | DaZd | Novigrad, Zadar County | 116 | 30.4 x 22 cm | | Glagolitic on 3v, 5r, 6v, 7, 8v, 9. | |
| matricula | | 1719–1820 | | Pašman (župni ured) | Pašman (town) | 286 p | 30.2 x 21.4 cm | | Madrikula sv. Marije. Completely Glagolitic except for sporadic Latinic. Lost as of 2015. | |
| matricula | | 1719–1778 | | Tkon | Tkon | | 40.5 x 13.5 cm | | Matrikula Skule sv. Tome. Lost as of 2015. | |
| dialogue | | 1719 | Sign. MS 51 | Košljun | Košljun | 178 p | 20.5 x 14.5 cm | | Dijalog Grgura pape (Bonifacije V). | |
| | | 1719 (December 19) | Spisi Ninske biskupije, kut. 2, br. 37 | Arhiv Zadarske nadbiskupije | Nadin | 1 | | | Letter of don Ivan Milišić parish priest of Nadin to the bishop of Nin. | |
| christenings | | 1720–1759 | br. 669 | DaZd | Novigrad | 140 | 28.9 x 20.5 cm | | Latinic with some Glagolitic (on f. 5r-7v, 9v, 10r-12v, 14v, 15r-22v, 23r, 24, 25v, 26r). | DaZd |
| | | 1720–1750 | | Zagreb (Arhiv Provincijalata franjevaca trećoredaca) | Zadar (Samostan sv. Ivana) | 14 p | 33.5 x 11 cm | | Od intrade pok. Orsade 1720–1750. Completely Glagolitic. | |
| matricula | | 1720–1841 | | DaZd | Biograd | | | | Biogradska madrikula Bratovštine od Uznesenja Blažene Djevice Marije. The brotherhood was founded 15 August 1720. Glagolitic to f 46 then Latinic then again Glagolitic from f 78. | |
| | | 1720 (July 6, 10) | Spisi Ninske biskupije, kut. 2, br. 36 | Arhiv Zadarske nadbiskupije | Petrčane | 1 | | | Letter of don Šime Stanić parish priest of Petrčane to the parish priest of Ražanac don Mate Rukavina with reply from don Mate. | |
| christenings | | 1721–1812 | br. 1642 | DaZd | Posedarje | 90 p | 29.8 x 22 cm | | Latinic with Glagolitic 1756–1760. Once at the Franciscan monastery in Karin, now at the Državni arhiv u Zadru. | DaZd, FS |
| christening | | 1721 (January 12) | Spisi Ninske biskupije, kut. 2, br. 38 | Arhiv Zadarske nadbiskupije | | | | | "Bi karšćena Mandalena hći Matija Španića i negove prave žene Jelene hćere Marka Matulića svi z Molata a karsti pokojni don Šime Šibuda parokijan". | |
| confirmations and souls | | 1721–1825 | | Arhiv Zadarske nadbiskupije | Ist | 130 p | 29 x 9.5 cm | 1 co | Libar od krizme i o(d) Duš u Istu. Glagolitic to 1815 then Latinic. Kept until 1947 in the župni ured in Ugljan when it was returned to Ist. | GUZ, PB |
| deaths | | 1721–1828, 1876–1879 | | Arhiv Zadarske nadbiskupije | Vrsi | 192 p | 29 x 20.5 cm | | Glagolitic except for Latinic pages 168-172 and 175–177. | |
| deaths | | 1721–1822 | | Arhiv Zadarske nadbiskupije | Privlaka | 78 p | 28.5 x 20 cm | 1 co | Glagolitic and Latinic. | GUZ, PB |
| | | 1721 | IV a 46 | Arhiv HAZU | | 8 | 20.5 x 14 cm | | Oficij B. D. Marije Karmelske. Scribe: Ivan Uravić parish priest of Dobrinj, who translated it as well, from a Latin breviary printed 1695 or 1694. He also wrote IV a 44. | |
| christenings | | 1722- | | Poljica (župni ured) | Poljica | 20 | | | Lost. | |
| christenings | | 1722–1723 | | | Sukošan | 103 p | | | | FS |
| christenings | | 1722–1829 | br. 83 | Državni arhiv u Zadru | Biograd na More | 324 p | | | Glagolitic to 1789 then Latinic. | DaZd, FS |
| matricula | | 1772–1816 | | Arhiv Zadarske nadbiskupije | Tkon | 138 p | 32 x 23 cm | | Madrikula Bratovštine Gospe Sedam žalosti. Glagolitic and Latinic. | |
| | | 1722–1745 | II c 19 (Kuk. VII) | Arhiv HAZU | Baška | 26 | 29 x 10.5 cm | | Polica od osmarije bašćanskog klera i drugo. Glagolitic then mixed Glagolitic and Latinic. | |
| register | | 1722–1726 | Fragm. glag. 131 | Arhiv HAZU | Dobrinj | | | | Fragments removed in 1960 from the Dobrinj register of 1560–1566 (sign. IX 10), dating to the 18th century but some specifically 1722–1726. They include (1) a 19.5 x 7.5 cm fragment (2) a 20 x 29.5 cm fragment 1722–1726 (3) a 20.3 x 28.5 cm bifolium from the same period (4) a 20.3 x 15 cm folio (5 and 6) very small fragments from the same period (7) a 14 x 20.5 cm fragment (8) 2 strips of a folio 21 x 14 cm. There are also 21 small pieces of paper 3 x 19 cm on which the confirmations were written (buletini) before being entered into the parish registers, which is notable because very few of these survive. | |
| breviary | | 1722? | IV a 44 | Arhiv HAZU | | 40 | 20 x 14.5 cm | | Novi oficij – dodatak brevijaru. Largely ikavian. Scribe: Ivan Uravić parish priest of Dobrinj, matching IV a 46 which was written 1721. | |
| cure and curse book | | | | | | | | | | |
| R 3372 (St. sign. SM.32.F.24) | NSK | Poljica | 24 | 14.1 x 10.3 cm | 1 co | Zaklinjanja i zapisi protiv raznih bolesti i zlih duhova. By scribe Antun Brzac. Bibliography: | NSK | | | |
| deaths | | 1723–1765 | | Arhiv Zadarske nadbiskupije | Murvica | 60 p | 29.5 x 10.5 cm | | | |
| matricula | | 1723–1808, 1880–1885 | | Banj (župni ured) | Dobropoljana | 250 p | 37 x 13.8 cm | | Glagolitic to 1808 when brotherhood abolished, resumed in Latinic. From Dobropoljana despite eventually being kept at Banj. | |
| matricula | | 1723–1767 | | Zavičajni muzej u Biogradu | Tinj | 24 | 30.3 x 21 cm | | Madrikula Bratovštine sv. Petra i sv. Ivana Krstitelja u Tinju i Bibanjima. | |
| | | 1723–1799 | | Omišalj (župni ured) | Omišalj | 47 | 31 x 22 cm | | Knjiga bratovštine Gospe od Karmena. Glagolitic with some Italian. | |
| | | 1723 | VII 163 | Arhiv HAZU | | 31 | 14.3 x 10 cm | | Kršćanski nauk (priolov). Scribe: Mikula Lukarić deacon in Dobrinj. But uses Vrbnik dialect instead of Dobrinj dialect. Acquired by JAZU with Gršković archive in 1959. | |
| ledger | | 1723–1750 | | Arhiv Zadarske nadbiskupije | Olib | | 21.5 x 14.9 cm | 1 co | Računi Bratovštine duš od purgatorija. | GUZ, PB |
| ledger | | 1724–1830 | | Arhiv Zadarske nadbiskupije | Olib | 408 p | 32 x 13.5 cm | | Kvateran skule Gospe od uznesenja u Olibu. Glagolitic to 1794 then Latinic. Bibliography: | GUZ, PB |
| | | 1724–1789 | 14 | Dobrinj (župni ured) | Dobrinj | 100 | | | Knjiga bratovštine Gospe od Anđela: isprave. Scribes: Ivan Sormilić, Anton Petriš. Both notaries. | |
| | | 1724–1725 | IV a 121 (IV a 152) | Arhiv HAZU | | 613 | 18.5 x 14 cm | | Kuzmićev zbornik crkvenih govora i kršćanskog nauka. Scribe: fra Marko Kuzmić. He wrote the first part 1724–1725 in the monastery sv. Ivan in Zadar and the second half 1725 on Školjić (the islet Galevac by Zadar). Intended for the press but unfinished. Still in Sutomišćica on Ugljan in the 18th century. Bibliography: | |
| marriages | | 1725–1803 | | Arhiv Zadarske nadbiskupije | Vrsi | 59 | 29 x 20.5 cm | | Glagolitic except for 2 Latinic entries and several Italian notes. | |
| receipts and expenditures | | 1725–1735 | | Zagreb (Arhiv Provincijalata franjevaca trećoredaca) | Zadar (Samostan sv. Ivana) | 76 p | 33.3 x 22.2 cm | | Datja i prijatja Samostana sv. Ivana u Zadru. | |
| receipts | | 1725–1777 | | DaZd | Zadar | 45 | 19.2 x 13.3 cm | | Libro di riceput di S. Antonio abbate. A book of receipts of the Bratovština sv. Antuna opata in Zadar. | |
| | | 1725 (February 10) | Spisi Ninske biskupije, kut. 2, br. 39 | Arhiv Zadarske nadbiskupije | Vir | 1 | | | Letter of don Lovre Uglešić parish priest of Vir to the bishop of Nin. | |
| | | 1725 (July 31) | Spisi Ninske biskupije, kut. 2, br. 40/41 | Arhiv Zadarske nadbiskupije | Olib | 2 | | | Letter of pop Mate Dijanić of Olib to the bishop of Nin. | |
| | | 1725 (October 14) | Spisi Ninske biskupije, kut. 2, br. 42 | Arhiv Zadarske nadbiskupije | Olib | 1 | | | Letter of don Ive Piculić of Olib to the bishop of Nin. | |
| matricula | | 1725–1820 | | Arhiv Zadarske nadbiskupije | Vinjerac | 90 p | 28.8 x 11 cm | 1 co | Madrikula Bratovštine sv. Ante u Vinjercu. Glagolitic to 1790 then Latinic from 1798 on. Bibliography: | GUZ, PB |
| deaths | | 1726–1803 | inv. br. 5 | Bogovići (župni ured) | Dubašnica | 81 | 48.5 x 14 cm | | Completely Glagolitic. | |
| protocol | | 1726–1734 | Glagolitica 5.7 | Croatian State Archives | Dubašnica | 173 | | | Treći protokol notara Jurja Sormilića iz Dubašnice. Begins 9 March 1726. | IzSt (2008) |
| questions and answers | | 1726 | | Arhiv Zadarske nadbiskupije | Silba | 56 p | 21.5 x 15.5 cm | 1 co | Libar glagoljaša don Antona Garofala od Silbe. | GUZ, PB |
| | | 1727–1854 | | Arhiv Zadarske nadbiskupije | Ist | 86 p | 31.4 x 21.5 cm | 1 co | Knjiga dobara crkve sv. Nikole. Glagolitic (p 1–8, 12–15, 18–35, 65–79) then Latinic. | GL, PB |
| matricula | | 1727–1822 | | | Vrsi | | | | Madrikula sv. Mihovila. | |
| ledger | | 1727–1729 | | Galevac (Samostan sv. Pavla) | Zadar (Samostan sv. Ivana) | 12 p | 30.2 x 22.5 cm | | Blagajnički dnevnik 1727–1729. | |
| will | | 1727 (November 25) | fond Oporuke iz kancelarije zadarskih knezova | DaZd | Sali | | | | Oporuka don Antona Vodopije. | |
| will | | 1727 | fond Oporuke iz kancelarije zadarskih knezova, knjiga II, br. 207 | Državni arhiv u Zadru | Smilčić? (then under Nadin) | | | | Oporuka Mare Taraševe. Scribe: don Ivan Milišić župnik of Nadin. Possibly written in Smilčić. | |
| christenings | | 1728–1775 | VIII 200 | Arhiv HAZU | Montrilj | 45 (I), 26 (II) | 28.3 x 10 cm | | Mostly Glagolitic (by priests Anton Milohnić and Ivan Lesica). Transition to only Italian in 1762 with final Glagolitic entry 11 February 1762. These Glagolitic scribes priests bore surnames characteristic of Krk, explaining the use of Glagolitic in Istria after its extermination from everywhere but monasteries. | |
| matricula | | 1728–1818 | | Arhiv Zadarske nadbiskupije | Sukošan | 174 p | 42.2 x 15 cm | 1 co | Madrikula Bratovštine Gospe od Milosrđa. Glagolitic to 1789 then Latinic. Second half of book written upside-down. | GUZ, PB |
| | | 1728–1767 | Libro Nro IIII | Dobrinj (župni ured) | Dobrinj | 184 | 31.5 x 22 cm | | Kapitulska knjiga: ugovori o najmovima. Glagolitic with some Italian. | |
| register | | 1728 | R 3371 (old SM 32 F 23) | Sveučilišna knjižnica u Zagrebu | Baška | 94 | | | Knjiga kapitulskog dižmara Viska Tomašića. | |
| | | 1728 (May 4) | Spisi Ninske biskupije, kut. 2, br. 42 | Arhiv Zadarske nadbiskupije | Poličnik | 1 | | | Vira dona Ive Šulića parohijana Poličnika. | |
| | | 1728 (November 11) | Spisi Ninske biskupije, kut. 2, br. 44 | Arhiv Zadarske nadbiskupije | "u Suvarah" | 1 | | | Letter of Grgo Burmetić to the see of Nin. | |
| matricula | | 1729–1807, 1858–1966 | | Arhiv Zadarske nadbiskupije | Kali | 96 p | 28.2 x 19.7 cm | 1 co | Madrikula Gospe 7 žalosti. Glagolitic to 1807 when brotherhood abolished, then Latinic from 1858 when reestablished. One of the last manuscripts with Glagolitic to be in use for records. | GUZ, PB |
| matricula | | 1729–1822 | | Arhiv Zadarske nadbiskupije | Olib | 132 p | 29 x 10 cm | 1 co | Madrikula Sv. Petra i Pavla u Olibu. Glagolitic to 1810 then Latinic. | GUZ, PB |
| matricula | | 1729–1793 | | Arhiv Zadarske nadbiskupije | Veli Iž | 144 p | 31.1 x 10.5 cm | 1 co | Madrikula sv. Duha. | GUZ, PB |
| | | 1729–1730 | VII 114 | Arhiv HAZU | Baška | 38 | 14 x 9.7 cm | | Kršćanski nauk (priolov). Translation of the Dottrina of Lorenzo Priol. Written by several hands including one hand A f. 1-26v. Hand A was a certain priest Bar[tol] whose language matches Baška. Acquired by Vjekoslav Štefanić together with VII 115 in Draga Bašćanska in the house of Juraj Derenčinović who had inherited it from his father. Given by Štefanić to Arhiv JAZU in 1958. | |
| song | | 1729 | IV a 75 (IV a 66) | Arhiv HAZU | Zadar archipelago | 10 | 19.7 x 15 cm | | Mrtvačke "Šekvencije". Written on an island of the Zadar archipelago. Possibly in Sali. Possibly part of the Berčić collection. | |
| miscellany | CGrd | 1700s (beginning) | I d 40 (Kuk. 748) | Arhiv HAZU | | 769 | 45 x 34 cm | | Grdovićev zbornik. Written entirely by Ive Grdović. One of the largest Glagoitic manuscripts. Acquired by Kukuljević 1857 in Zadar. Kukuljević wrote it was written in island dialect in Poljana by Zadar and was revered by the Glagolitic priests of the region to the extent they made pilgrimages to it. One photograph in Štefanić 1970. Bibliography: | |
| blessing | | 1700s | VII 151 | Arhiv HAZU | Baška? | 8 | | | Blagoslov od polja. From the remains of Vinko Premuda. | |
| | | 1700s (after 1729) | VII 112 | Arhiv HAZU | | 40 | 14 x 9.8 cm | | Priručnik o crkvenim redovima. Acquired by Štefanić from Juraj Derenčinović in Draga Bašćanska, given by Štefanić to JAZU in 1958. | |
| | | 1700s | XVIII C 41 | Prague (National Museum) | | 2 | 19 x 18.5 cm | | Česká bible hlaholská, přísloví 4, 1-20. Glagolitic transcription from the XVII A 1. Scribe: Antonín Pišely (1758–1806). | |
| marriages | | 1730–1821 | br. 699 | Državni arhiv Zadar | Olib | 164 p | 28.8 x 10 cm | 1 co | Glagolitic to 1796 then Latinic. Facsimile published 2012. | DaZd, FS |
| marriages | | 1730–1811 | VIII 199 | Arhiv HAZU | Montrilj | 20 (I), 48 (II) | 28 x 9.5 cm, 28.3 x 10 cm | | Mostly Glagolitic to 1762 then Latinic. | |
| | | 1730–1804 | | | Vrh (Krk) | | | | Knjiga bratovštine sv. Mihovila 1730–1804. Still in the župni ured of Vrh in 1910. | |
| annerversaries | | 1730–1840 | | Arhiv Zadarske nadbiskupije | Sutomišćica | 26 | 39.3 x 13.5 cm | | Glagolitic. | |
| | | 1730 | IV a 118 | Arhiv HAZU | | 110 | 18.5 x 13 cm | | Pejkićevo zarcalo od jistine, Kuzmićevićev prijepis. Scribe: fra Marko Kuzmićević/Kuzmić, Franciscan III order of Zadar, who also wrote the miscellany of 1724–1725 (sign. IV a 121). A Glagolitic transcription of a Cyrillic original printed 1716. Acquired by Ivan Berčić, entered Arhiv JAZU 1895 with his library. One photograph in Štefanić 1970. Photocopies are kept on DVD at the HDA (DVD 13) and the Staroslavenski institut (DVD 11(HDA)). Bibliography: | |
| land register | | 1730, 1780 | | Samostan sv. Mihovila na Zaglavu | Zaglav | 24 p | 28 x 20 cm | | Knjiga posjeda Samostana sv. Mihovila. Glagolitic with Italian translation. Partially a transcript from a previous manuscript written 1577 onward. | |
| christenings | | 1731–1762 | br. 547 | DaZd | Kukljica | 140 p | 20.5 x 11.3 cm | | Begins 6 August 1731. On 9 January 1880 it was found among the belongings of the deceased Ivan Berčić and sent back to Kukljica. Facsimile published 2014. | DaZd |
| marriages | | 1731–1762 | | Kukljica (župni ured) | Kukljica | 136 p | 29.8 x 11.1 cm | | | FS |
| deaths | | 1731–1738 | | Veli Rat (župni ured) | Veli Rat | 24 p | 29.5 x 10 cm | | Register combines Božave, Soline and Veli Rat. | |
| annerversaries | | 1731 – 1800s (beginning) | VIII 201 | Arhiv HAZU | Montrilj | 43 (I), 24 (II), 53 (III), 4 (IV) | 28 x 10 cm | | Glagolitic and Latinic mixed and alternating with last Glagolitic entries by Lesica. | |
| | | 1731–1806 | inv. br. 7 | Baška (župni ured) | Baška | 158 | 28.5 x 18.8 cm | | Kapitulska knjiga (ugovori, zapisi o legatima i drugo). Italian and Glagolitic but Croatian Latinic from 1802 at least mostly. | |
| christenings | | 1732–1760 | br. 1205 | DaZd | Sukošan | | | | Completely Glagolitic. | DaZd |
| protocol | | 1732–1737 | br. 37 | Vrbnik (župni ured) | Vrbnik | 201 | 31 x 21.5 cm | | Protokol notara Antona Petriša. In arhiv krčkog kotarskog suda until after WWI. | |
| | | 1732–1824 | br. 154 | Krk (arhiv samostana trećoredaca) | Krk | 37 | 18.7 x 13. 5 cm | | Knjiga bratovštine "Duš od purgatorija" na Vrhu. Glagolitic to 1800 then mostly Latinic. | |
| mass legates register | | 1732- | | Monastery of Saint Mary Magdalene in Porat, Krk | Baška | | | | | NSK |
| christenings | | 1732–1760 | | Arhiv HAZU | Sukošan | 350 p | 28.4 x 9.4 cm | | Glagolitic with one Latin entry on page 96. | FS |
| matricula | | 1732–1827 | | Arhiv Zadarske nadbiskupije | Olib | 76 p | 29.7 x 11.4 cm | 1 co | Madrikula Bratovštine svetog Roka. Glagolitic on ff. 1-37, 72r-76, Latinic on 38-52r. | GUZ, PB |
| | | 1732 (June 6) | II br. 232 | Šibenik (Gradski muzej) | Olib | | | | Ateštat parona Zuvana. Scribe: don Ivan Piculić. | |
| | | 1733–1746, 1765–1767 | br. 3 | Vrbnik (župni ured) | Vrbnik | 11+7 | 31 x 21 cm | | Dva fragmenta kapitulskih knjiga. | |
| legal | | 1733 (July 30) | Glagolitica II-50 | HDA | Zadar | | | | Generalni providur Dalmacije i Albanije zapovijeda na molbu doktora Ante Fafunića Jadreskima iz Mrljana da prepuste zemlju u Vodoščani dijaku Jakovu Peteriću. Italian translation on second folio. | IzSt (2008) |
| letter | | 1733 (November 25) | II br. 233 | Šibenik (Gradski muzej) | Vrgada | | | | Pismo kapitana Ivana Slovinića. Scribe: don Jerolim Vergada. | |
| protocol | | 1734–1737 | Glagolitica 5.8, 6.8, knjiga 14 | Croatian State Archives | Dubašnica | 298 | | | Četvrti protokol notara Jurja Sormilića iz Dubašnice. Begins 25 January 1734. Connected manuscript history with the 1755 Koncept protokola notara Ivana Sormilića. | IzSt (2008) |
| christenings, marriages | | 1734–1815, 1826–1855 | br. 1479 | DaZd | Vrpolje (Šibenik) | 188 p | | | Christenings 1734–1815, 1826–1839, marriages 1826–1855. Glagolitic to 1737 then Cyrillic to 1791 then Latin (possibly also Glagolitic from 1746 on per Stošić). Italian also. | FS |
| protocol | | 1734–1760 | Glagolitica 4.3 | Croatian State Archives | Krk (town) | 192 | | | Protokol notara Gerolama Cernizza. | IzSt (2008) |
| marriages | | 1734–1827 | inv. br. 7 | DaZd | Arbanasi | 156 p | 29.7 x 10.7 cm | | Glagolitic only on pages 34–35 from 1760, 88-90 from 1802 and 1803. Rest Italian (to 1759) and then Croatian Latinic. | DaZd, FS |
| deaths | | 1734–1828 | inv. br. 11 | DAZd | Arbanasi | 118 | 29.8 x 10.9 cm | | Glagolitic only on pages 19v, 63r-66r, 87r, 88v. Rest Italian and Croatian Latinic. | DaZd FS |
| | | 1734 | | | Bijar (Samostan Sv. Marije) | | | | Ostavština fra Mateja Vodarića. | |
| | | 1734 | | | Bijar (Samostan Sv. Marije) | | | | Troškovi pravde s Orlečanima. | |
| | | 1734 | R 3369 (old SM 3 F 21) | Sveučilišna knjižnica u Zagrebu | Baška | 71 | | | Dotrina karšćanska Mika Dorčića. Translated by Dorčić from a work by L. Priuli. | |
| food and wine | | 1734–1869 | | Monastery of Saint Mary Magdalene in Porat, Krk | Dubašnica, Krk | 99 | 28 x 20 cm | | Knjiga ljetine (hrana i vina). Glagolitic to 1840 then Italian. | |
| movable property | | 1734–1878 | | Monastery of Saint Mary Magdalene in Porat, Krk | Dubašnica, Krk | 103 | 28.5 x 19 cm | | Inventari pokretne imovine. Glagolitic to 1830 then Latinic from 1840. | |
| adoptions and noviciates | | 1734–1889 | | Monastery of Saint Mary Magdalene in Porat, Krk | Dubašnica, Krk | 50 | 28.4 x 20.2 cm | | Knjiga posinovljenja i novicijata. Glagolitic to 1835 then Italian. | |
| memorials for deceased brothers | | 1734–1769 | | Monastery of Saint Mary Magdalene in Porat, Krk | Dubašnica, Krk | 78 | 28.5 x 10.3 cm | | Knjiga zadušnica za umrlu braću. | |
| | | 1734, 1749, 1767, 1785 | kutija 8 | HDA | Vrbnik | | | | Kutija 8. Contains (1) Dvije notarske isprave iz Omišlja i Miholjice (1734. i 1767), (2) Fragment notarske knjige iz Dobrinja (1749) i jedna notarska isprava (1785), (3) Registar notarske knjige iz Dubašnice, (4) Italian language Notarska knjiga Krka (1692–1693). | |
| | | 1734 (November 24) | Spisi Ninske biskupije, kut. 2, br. 46/47 | Arhiv Zadarske nadbiskupije | | 2 | | | Letter of Roko Milatović to the bishop of Nin. | |
| | | 1734 | Spisi Ninske biskupije, kut. 2, br. 49 | Arhiv Zadarske nadbiskupije | | | | | Letter of don Miško Dunčić chaplain of bl. Gospe od Luzarija to the bishop of Nin. | |
| | | 1734 | Spisi Ninske biskupije, kut. 2, br. 50 | Arhiv Zadarske nadbiskupije | | | | | Letter of don Lovre Žuović chaplain of bl. Gospe sv. Mihovila to the bishop of Nin. | |
| christenings, confirmations, marriages, deaths | | 1735–1832 | IX 31 | Arhiv HAZU | Punat | 190 | 31.6 x 21.6 cm | | Christenings (1735–1805, 1812–1829), marriages (1735–1832), deaths (1794–1832), confirmations (1735–1831). Glagolitic to 1793 then Latinic. | FS |
| miscellany | CHrž | 1735–1740 | VII 34 | Arhiv HAZU | Dubašnica (samostan sv. Mandalene) | 103 | 19.2 x 14.3 cm | | Hržić miscellany (Hržićev zbornik). Scribe: Šimun Hržić. Includes notes. Remained in the monastery it was written in until 1882 when the gvardijan Benko Žgombić gave it to Ivan Milčetić. One photograph in Štefanić 1970. | |
| | | 1735 (July 3, 10) | Spisi Ninske biskupije, kut. 2, br. 51 | Arhiv Zadarske nadbiskupije | Zadar, Starigrad | 1 | | | Decree of Paulo Querini count of Zadar on behalf of the Republic of Venice. In Italian and Glagolitic. Confirmed in Starigrad by Marko Katalinić on 10 July, also in Glagolitic. | |
| | | 1735 (July 3, 10) | Spisi Ninske biskupije, kut. 2, br. 52 | Arhiv Zadarske nadbiskupije | Zadar, Visočani | 1 | | | Decree of Maria Moresini captain of Zadar on behalf of the Republic of Venice. In Italian and Glaolitic. Confirmed in Visočani on 10 July, also in Glagolitic. | |
| | | 1735 (October 24) | Spisi Ninske biskupije, kut. 2, br. 45 | Arhiv Zadarske nadbiskupije | Raštević | 1 | | | Letter of don Mio Gašparović paroch in Raštević to the bishop of Nin. | |
| | | 1735 (December 2) | Spisi Ninske biskupije, kut. 2, br. 48 | Arhiv Zadarske nadbiskupije | Raštević | 1 | | | Letter of don Mio Gašparević paroch in Raštević. | |
| deaths | | 1736–1830 | | Arhiv Zadarske nadbiskupije | Rava | 52 p | 29.5 x 10.5 cm | 1 co | Glagolitic to 1810 then Latinic from 1813. | GUZ, PB |
| | | 1736 (June 7) | Spisi Ninske biskupije, kut. 2, br. 53 | Arhiv Zadarske nadbiskupije | Venice | 1 | | | Italian decree, ratified in Glagolitic in Dobrinj by pop Zan Paval, by pop Matij Štorčić and by pop Marko Grandić of Baška. Uncertain path to the Nin archives. | |
| will | | 1736 | fond Oporuke iz kancelarije zadarskih knezova | Državni arhiv u Zadru | Smilčić | | | | Scribe: don Marko Kadija parohijan of Smilčić. By this year, Smilčić had likely become an independent parish from Nadin. | |
| deaths | | 1737–1830 | | Rava (župni ured) | Rava | 52 p | 29.5 x 10.5 cm | | Glagolitic to 1810 then Latinic (but no deaths 1811–1812). | |
| protocol | | 1737–1741, 1746 | VIII 275 | Arhiv HAZU | | 207 | 31.7 x 21 cm | | Notarski protokol Antona Petriša. | |
| ledger | | 1737–1739 | | Arhiv Zadarske nadbiskupije | Brbinj | 14 p | 22.5 x 15 cm | 1 co | Kvateran 1737–1739. | GUZ, PB |
| ledger and election | | 1737–1783 | 13 | Dobrinj (župni ured) | Dobrinj | 167 | 31.5 x 22 cm | | Knjiga bratovštine Gospe od Karmena: računi i izbor uprave. Glagolitic to 1772, Italian in 1783. The book that followed it was completely Italian. | |
| will | | 1737 | fond Oporuke iz kancelarije zadarskih knezova | Državni arhiv u Zadru | Vrana | | | | | |
| decree | | 1737 (June 5) | S.f.49 / c.5 | NUK | | 1 | 28 x 21 cm | | Dekret fra Lucija Šebenčanića o imenovanju gvardijana Antona Milohnića. | IzSt (2017 from NUK) |
| legal | | 1737 (June 18) | arhiv br. 78r | Tkon (župni ured) | Tkon | | | | Glagoljska kopija odluke zadarskoga kneza Antuna Foscarinija od 18. VI. 1737. u sporu između kmetova Tkona i rogovskog opata. Lost as of 2015. | |
| legal | | 1737 | HR–DAZD–359 (Obitelj Lantana collection) kut. 54 sign. 924 | DaZd | | 10 | | | Žalbe otočana Magistratu u Zadru u Zadru na teške namete u godinama gladi. Glagolitic with Italian translation. Part of Lantana family archive. Acquired by Državni arhiv u Zadru 1945. | |
| marriages | | 1738–1832 | br. 119 | DaZd | Božava | 136 p | 43.9 x 15.7 cm | | Glagolitic to 1805 inclusive then Latinic. | DaZd, FS |
| deaths | | 1738–1832 | | Arhiv Zadarske nadbiskupije | Božava | 160 p | 44.5 x 15.5 cm | 1 co | Glagolitic to 1807 inclusive then Latinic. | DaZd, GUZ, PB, FS |
| | | 1738–1776 | VII 61 | Arhiv HAZU | Baška | 41 | 14 x 9.5 cm | | Primici Bara Sušića od desetine. | |
| | | 1738–1804 | inv. br. 8 | Bogovići (župni ured) | Dubašnica | 140 | 30.5 x 21.5 cm | | Kapitulska knjiga: vječni legati. Glagolitic with Italian interspersed. | |
| christening | | 1738 (April 6) | Spisi Ninske biskupije, kutija 2, br. 54 | Arhiv Zadarske nadbiskupije | Vinjerac | 1 | | | Scribe: don Šime Dadić of Vinjerac. | |
| legal | | 1738 (July 9) | arhiv br. 1/16 | Tkon (župni ured) | Tkon | | | | Glagoljski prijepis naredbe proveditura Danijela Dolfina od 9. VII. 1738. o parnici između rogovskog opata Juricea i kmetova. Lost as of 2015. | |
| | | 1738, 1782 | HR–DAZD–359 (Obitelj Lantana collection) kut. 54 sign. 928 | DaZd | Molat | 16 | | | Kolonatski odnosi. Italian with Glagolitic on f. 12. Part of Lantana family archive. Acquired by Državni arhiv u Zadru 1945. | |
| | | 1738–1778 | inv. br. 5 | Baška (župni ured) | Baška | 227 | 31.5 x 22 cm | | Kopijalna knjiga o pravima klera. Glagolitic then mostly Italian. | |
| | | 1738–1767 | inv. br. 11 | Bogovići (župni ured) | Dubašnica | 193 | 31.5 x 21.7 cm | | Knjiga kapitula dubašljanskoga. Glagolitic with some Italian. Lost as of 2003 but possibly in the Biskupski arhiv u Krku. | |
| legates | | 1738–1804 | | Bogovići, Krk | Dubašnica, Krk | | | | | |
| christenings | | 1739–1825 | br. 1245 | DaZd | Sutomišćica | 478 p | 28.8 x 10 cm | | Glagolitic to 1812 then Latinic. | DaZd, 1: FS, 2: FS |
| abecedary | | 1739 | IV a 81 or IV a 76 | Arhiv HAZU | | 25 | 20 x 13.5 cm | | Bukvar slavenskij Matija Karamana. The manuscript predecessor of the Glagolitic-Cyrillic Karaman abecedary printed 1739. Written by multiple hands, one of which is thought to be Karaman's. One photograph in Štefanić 1970. | |
| mass register | | 1739–1764 | | Galevac (Samostan sv. Pavla) | Galevac | 74 p | 29.3 x 11.2 cm | | Knjiga vječnih misa Samostana sv. Pavla na Školjiću 1739–1764. | |
| ledger | | 1739–1798 | | Arhiv Zadarske nadbiskupije | Dobropoljana | 166 p | 37 x 14 cm | | Blagajnički dnevnik. | GL, PB |
| protocol | | 1739–1741 | Glagolitica 6.9 | Croatian State Archives | Dubašnica | 302 | | | Šesti protokol notara Jurja Sormilića iz Dubašnice. Begins 2 July 1739. | IzSt (2008) |
| christenings | | 1740–1749, 1752–1756, 1772–1778 | br. 1373 | DaZd | Ugljan (town) | 84 p | 30.7 x 10.1 cm | | Completely Glagolitic. | DaZd, FS |
| christenings, marriages, deaths | | 1740–1832 | br. 118 | DaZd | Božava | 180 p | 43.3 x 15.5 cm | 1 co | Glagolitic to 1802 then Latinic. | DaZd, FS |
| notebook | | 1740–1799 | | H. Morović library | Žman | 296 p | 30 x 105 cm | | Bilježnica popa Jurja Šibude. Includes two "štime" from 1796 and 1799 by don Luka Žuvić paroch in Žman. Several private notes on final pages. Glagolitic on pages 1–41, 251, 282–290, with some Latinic pages as well. Acquired by Mirko Didović, later by professor H. Morović. | |
| | | 1740–1790 | HR–DAZD–359 (Obitelj Lantana collection) kut. 54 sign. 932 | DaZd | | 27 | | | Kažnjavanje otočana Molata, Oliba i Premude. Italian with Glagolitic on f. 11 and f. 16. Part of Lantana family archive. Acquired by Državni arhiv u Zadru 1945. | |
| | | 1740 | IV a 80/29 | Arhiv HAZU | Lukoran | 1 | 28.4 x 19.8 cm | | Polica don Miška Dunčića. Scribe: don Miško Dunčić. Discovered by Berčić 19 December 1851 in the monastery sv. Marije u Zadru. | |
| | | 1740 | IV a 80/46 | Arhiv HAZU | | 2 | 20 x 14.3 cm | | Polica izrečenih misa. Discovered by Berčić 30 June 1852 in the monastery sv. Marije u Zadru. | |
| history | | 1740 | Glagolitica I-13 | Croatian State Archives | Ugljan (island), Dubašnica | 14 | 14.5 x 9.5 cm | | Ištoriě od dvih žen uglěnskih. Purchased by HDA from Antun Masanec. Before that part of Branko Vodnik collection, in turn an acquisition from the Milčetić collection. Acquired 1882 by Ivan Milčetić in Dubašnica. Lost as of 1960. Bibliography: | IzSt (2008) |
| christenings | | 1741–1801 | IX 1 | Arhiv HAZU | Novalja | 374 | 21.5 x 15 cm | | Latinic with Glagolitic only 1 January 1760 to 5 October 1761 and again 8 August 1764 to 13 October 1764, all by don Jive Šuljić. | 1: /, 2: FS |
| marriages, deaths | | 1741–1825 | IX 7 | Arhiv HAZU | Sveta Fuska (Linardići) | 104 | 31.3 x 21.7 cm | | Deaths 1741–1824 and marriages 1741–1825. Glagolitic to 1795 then Latinic. | FS |
| deaths | | 1741–1806 | br. 1381 | DaZd | Ugljan (town) | 236 p | 30.5 x 10 cm | | Glagolitic, cursive with majuscule title. | DaZd, FS |
| | | 1741–1811 | inv. br. 8 | Baška (župni ured) | Baška | 68 | 28 x 21 cm | | Kopijalna knjiga dokumenata bašćanskog kapitula. Italian with Glagolitic additions by priests (not notaries). | |
| | | 1741–1826 | | Arhiv Zadarske nadbiskupije | Zadar | 550 p | 30 x 21 cm | 1 co | Mandatorum III. Latinic with some Glagolitic (on pages 277, 319, 327, 329, 336, 342, 343, 347a, 354, 356, 358, 378). Bibliography: | GUZ, PB |
| | | 1741 (November 3) | Spisi Ninske biskupije, kutija 2, br. 56 | Arhiv Zadarske nadbiskupije | Raštević | 1 | | | Scribe: don Lovre paroch. Glagolitic with Italian. | |
| | | 1741 (November 18) | Spisi Ninske biskupije, kutija 2, br. 60 | Arhiv Zadarske nadbiskupije | "Vrh" | 1 | | | Scribe: don Jure Kuštera paroch of Vrh. | |
| | | 1741 (October 17) | Spisi Ninske biskupije, kutija 2, br. 57/58 | Arhiv Zadarske nadbiskupije | Smilčić | 2 | | | Scribe: don Marko Kadija in service in Smilčić. Glagolitic with Italian. | |
| | | 1741 (November 6) | Spisi Ninske biskupije, kutija 2, br. 59 | Arhiv Zadarske nadbiskupije | Polača | 1 | | | Letter of priest Jerolim Radinić paroch in Polača to the paroch of Korlat. Glagolitic with Italian. | |
| | | 1741 (December 17) | Spisi Ninske biskupije, kutija 2, br. 61, 62 | Arhiv Zadarske nadbiskupije | Nadin | 1 | | | Letter of priest Ivan Milišić to the bishop of Nin. Scribe: don Ivan Milišić paroch of Nadin. | |
| miscellany | | 1741 | I a 14 (Kuk. 1032) | Arhiv HAZU | | 38 | 13.5 x 9.5 cm | | Priručnik Matija Kraljića. Scribe: Matija Kraljić of Dubašnica. Remained in Dubašnica until acquisition by Kukuljević. Bibliography: | |
| ledger | | 1741–1774 | Ristro vecchio | Dobrinj (župni ured) | Dobrinj | 241 | 31.5 x 22 cm | | Kapitulska knjiga: godišnji računi. | |
| legal | | 1742 (January 9) | Glagolitica II-51 | HDA | Zadar | | | | Zadarski knez Anton Barbaro nalaže Ivi Kostiliću da doveze iz Mrljana u Zadar posječena drva što mu je platio Anton Fafunić. Italian translation and Glagolitic note on reverse. | IzSt (2008) |
| | | 1742 (September 30) | Spisi Ninske biskupije, kutija 2, br. 63 | Arhiv Zadarske nadbiskupije | Vrana | 1 | | | Letter of don Šime Torić paroch of Vrana to the paroch of Suhovare. | |
| | | 1742 (December 2) | Spisi Ninske biskupije, kutija 2, br. 64 | Arhiv Zadarske nadbiskupije | Vrsi | 1 | | | Letter of don Jure Kuštera paroch of Vrsi to the bishop of Nin. | |
| christenings, confirmations | | 1744–1840 | IX 8 | Arhiv HAZU | Linardići | 82 p | | | Glagolitic to 13 April 1795 then Latinic from 23 May. | FS |
| christenings | | 1742–1807 | br. 41 | Vrbnik (župni ured) | Vrbnik | 81 | 42.5 x 28.5 cm | | Written February 1742 to 6 July 1807 when a new book was begun in Latin. | |
| | | 1742–1807 | reg. br. 2 | Kras (župni ured) | Dobrinj | 84 | 31 x 21.7 cm | | Knjiga bratovštine sv. Antona. Originally from Dobrinj, brought to Kras after Kras in 1924 when parish founded. Includes copy of 1667–1669 book. | |
| | | 1742 | inv. br. 1 | Poljica (župni ured) | Poljica | 6 | 29.5 x 10.3 cm | | Polica vječnih obaveza poljičkog klera. Begins April 1742. | |
| | | 1742 | R 3365 (old SM 32 F 17) | Sveučilišna knjižnica u Zagrebu | Dobrinj | 12+8 | | | Molitve bogoljubne presvetomu imenu Isusovu (Milosti po misi). | |
| | | 1742 (after) | R 4545 | Sveučilišna knjižnica u Zagrebu | | Baška | | | Blagoslovi i zakletve. Scribe: Jivan Tranburić. | |
| christenings | | 1743–1825 | | Arhiv Zadarske nadbiskupije | Veli Iž | 178 p | 31.2 x 21.8 cm | 1 co | Glagolitic to 1819 then Latinic. | GUZ, PB |
| matricula | | 1743–1821 | | Arhiv Zadarske nadbiskupije | Sutomišćica | 184 p | 28.5 x 9.5 cm | | Glagoljska madrikula Bratovštine Blažene Gospe i duš od purgatorija. Not all pages are chronological. | |
| homiliary | | 1743? - before 1770 | | Olib (župni arhiv) | Olib | | 28.6 x 21 cm | | Script is that of Šime Radov Olibljanin, chaplain in Olib 1743–1777. Likely written before 1770. Contains 32 homilies, likely not his own. | FS |
| christenings | | 1743–1805 | br. 692 | Državni arhiv Zadar | Olib | 200 p | 31 x 21.8 cm | 1 co | Glagolitic to 1797, sporadically to 1800, then Latinic. Facsimile published 2012. Bibliography: | DaZd |
| | | 1743–1788 | | Omišalj (župni ured) | Omišalj | 286 | 31.5 x 21.5 cm | | Treća kapitulska knjiga Omišlja. | |
| | | 1747 (September 20) | Spisi Ninske biskupije, kutija 2, br. 66 | Arhiv Zadarske nadbiskupije | Korlat | 1 | | | Letter of don Vide Martinović. Glagolitic with Latinic additions including signature. | |
| will | | 1743 (July 30) | | DaZd | Sali | | | | Oporuka Dunata Rudića. | |
| | | 1743 (November 19) | Spisi Ninske biskupije, kutija 2, br. 65 | Arhiv Zadarske nadbiskupije | Korlat | 1 | | | Letter of don Šime Antunović of Korlat to the bishop of Nin. | |
| | | 1741–1821 | | Sutomišćica (župni ured) | Sutomišćica | | 27.4 x 9.2 cm | | Skula Gospe Karmela i Duš od Purgatorija. | |
| annerversaries | | 1744–1855 | | Arhiv Zadarske nadbiskupije | Ugljan (town) | 26 p | 42.2 x 14.7 cm | | Glagoljski godovnjak. Glagolitic to 1839 then Latinic. Begun by parish priest Jure Svorcina, continued by others. Found 1942 by D. P. Vlasanović in Tkon and returned to Ugljan. | GL, PB |
| deaths | | 1744–1830 | | Diklo (župni ured) | Diklo | 68 p | 29 x 10 cm | | Glagolitic to 1824 inclusive then Latinic. | |
| christenings | | 1744–1816, 1824 | | Diklo (župni ured) | Diklo | 144 p | 27.6 x 9.5 cm | | Glagolitic to 1816. Only 1791–1793 Latinic. | |
| souls | | 1744–1810, 1821–1837 | br. 1042 | DaZd | Sestrunj | 36 p | 26.7 x 9.1 cm | | Libar duš. Glagolitic to 1810 inclusive then Latinic. | DaZd, FS |
| protocol | | 1744–1746 | Glagolitica 6.10, 7.10 | Croatian State Archives | Dubašnica | 99 | | | Dio protokola notara Jurja Sormilića iz Dubašnice. | IzSt (2008) |
| protocol | | 1744–1777 | Glagolitica 4.5 | Croatian State Archives | Krk (town) | 185+35 | | | Protokol notara Antonija dalla Nave. | IzSt (2008) |
| ledger | | 1744–1772 | br. 10 | Vrbnik (župni ured) | Vrbnik | 41 | 28 x 19.5 cm | | Kapitulska knjiga računa. | |
| ritual | | 1745–1750 (about) | III a 8 | Arhiv HAZU | | 20 | 14.5 x 10 cm | | Evanđelja i molitve o užašću. Glagolitic with Latinic table at end. Glagolitic part written by Frane Tancabelić, who also wrote the Polica od osmarije in Baška to 1741 (II c 19). Tancabelić became curate in Sveta Fuska (Linardići) near Krk. Language with ikavisms and some cakavism. Includes notes on f. 1. | |
| matricula | | 1745–1821 | | Arhiv Zadarske nadbiskupije | Sutomišćica | | 30.6 x 21 cm | | Catalogued by Cvitanović. Possibly a duplicate of Cvitanović's 1741–1821 matricula. Scribes: 2 or maybe 3 hands. From 1754 to 1802 the handwriting matches that of don Jure Vlakić. | |
| matricula | | 1745–1818 | VIII 155 | Arhiv HAZU | Sukošan | 22 | 27 x 18 cm | | Odlomak matrikule bratovštine duša u Sutkošanu 1745–1818. Completely Glagolitic. Purchased by JAZU in 1958 from the antikvarijat Poljoprivrednoga nakladnog zavoda in Zagreb. | |
| | | 1745–1762, 1776 | br. 13 | Vrbnik (župni ured) | Vrbnik | 175 | 21.5 x 15.3 cm | | Kapitulska knjiga instrumenata (zajmovi i zakupi). | |
| | | 1745–1800 | | Arhiv Zadarske nadbiskupije | Sutomišćica | 46 p | 32 x 22.5 cm | | Skula "Corpus Domini" (Tila Isusova). | |
| protocols | | 1745–1818 | Glagolitica 10 + 11 + 12 + 13 + 14 + 15 + 16 | HDA | Dubašnica | | | | Koncepti notarskih protokola Dubašnice. Kutija 1, omot 1-10+11-22+21-22 contains 22 concepts: Notarski koncepti Jurja i Ivana Sormilića (3 June 1745 – 21 September 1770). Kutija 2, omot 1-9+9-20-20-21 contains 19 concepts: Notarski koncepti Ivana Sormilića, in addition to Razne izane isprave u razdoblju 1767–1791. godine and Koncepti notarskih zapisa u Dubašnici i Omišlju 1771–1772. Kutija 3, omot 1-8+8-20+20-21 contains 21 concepts: Notarski koncepti većinom Pavla Sormilića (21 November 1793 – 1 January 1818). | |
| matricula | | 1745–1806 | | Sukošan? | Sukošan | 48 p | 27 x 18.8 cm | | Matricula of Souls of purgatory. Glagolitic to 1788 then Latinic. Lost as of 2015. | FS |
| ledger | | 1745–1764 | inv. br. 15 | Baška (župni ured) | Baška | 195 | 31.5 x 21.5 cm | | Knjiga računa kapitulskog dižmara. | |
| marriages | | 1746–1827 | | Arhiv Zadarske nadbiskupije | Gorica (Gornje Raštane) | 94 p | 28.5 x 10 cm | 1 co | Glagolitic to 1809 then Latinic. | GUZ, PB |
| receipts and expenditures | | 1746–1804 | | Monastery of Saint Mary Magdalene in Porat, Krk | Dubašnica, Krk | 390 | 37.8 x 24.8 cm | | Completely Glagolitic. | |
| homiliary | | 1746–1756 | IV a 94 | Arhiv HAZU | | 144 | 19.5 x 14 cm | | Zbirka propovijedi Nikole Belića. Scribe: Nikola Belić of Ugljan. One photograph in Štefanić 1970. Bibliography: | |
| | | 1746–1753 | VII 166 | Arhiv HAZU | Baška | 12 | 13.7 x 9.5 cm | | Komad gospodarske bilježnice. | |
| homiliary | | 1744- | IV a 80/14b, 14c, 16 | Arhiv HAZU | | 19 + 28 + 3 | | | Zbirka propovijedi don Ante Škifića. Scribe: Ante Škifić (main scribe) who began to write it in 1744. Probably on Dugi otok, possibly the same Ante Škifić who was the keeper of the parish register u Savru on Dugi. The br. 14b contains 19 folia of size 18.4 x 14 cm. The br. 14c contains 28 folia of size 19.3 x 14 cm. The br. 16 contains 3 folia of size 18 x 14 cm. | |
| will | | 1746 | fond Oporuke iz kancelarije zadarskih knezova | Državni arhiv u Zadru | Islam Latinski | | | | | |
| christenings | | 1747–1816 | IX 22 | Arhiv HAZU | Baška | 230 | 32.5 x 21.7 cm | | Glagolitic to 23 December 1793 then Latinic from 1794. | FS |
| christenings, marriages, deaths | | 1747–1901 | Inv. br. 347 | Islam Latinski (župni arhiv) | Islam Latinski | 401 p | | | Christenings 1747–1874, marriages 1825–1874, deaths 1826–1901. Latinic with one Glagolitic entry 18 February 1767 (p 29). | DaZd, FS |
| marriages | | 1747–1838 | | Arhiv Zadarske nadbiskupije | Visočane | 78 p | 28.5 x 10 cm | 1 co | Latinic with Glagolitic on pages 16–18, 22 and 23. | GUZ, PB |
| marriages | | 1747–1825 | br. 1248/A (br. 1248A) | DaZd | Sutomišćica | 132 p | 28.4 x 10 cm | | Glagolitic to 1806 then Latinic. | DaZd, FS |
| deaths | | 1747–1812 | | HDA | Beli (Cres) | 65 p | | | Italian with some Glagolitic at beginning. | FS |
| | | 1747–1794 | inv. br. 12 | Baška (župni ured) | Baška | 136 | 32 x 22 cm | | Knjiga računa kapitulskih prokuradura i drugo. Glagolitic with some Latinic. | |
| | | 1747–1820 | | Pašman (župni ured) | Pašman (town) | 188 p | 27.3 x 9.4 cm | | Libar dobitka sv. Marije. Almost completely Glagolitic with very little Latinic. | |
| | | 1747 (November 22) | Spisi Ninske biskupije, kutija 2, br. 67 | Arhiv Zadarske nadbiskupije | Vinjerac | 1 | | | Scribe: don Šime Dadić paroch of Vinjerac. | |
| | | 1747 (after or before) | sign. 27520 | Zadar (Sveučilišna knjižnica) | 22 | | | | Glagoljski rukopis uz latinički tekst don Luke Terzića "Pokripglenie umiruchi", 1747. 6 pages of Glagolitic + 2 of Latinic + 11 of Glagolitic + 3 empty. Two 1982 partial photocopies (F 370, F 371) was brought to the Staroslavenski institut by Petešić. | |
| christenings | | 1748–1825 | IX 37 | Arhiv HAZU | Ćunski (Lošinj) | 52 | 29.5 x 18.5 cm | | Italian with 7 Glagolitic entries from 27 April 1751 to 27 June 1759. | |
| confirmations, deaths | | 1748–1818 | IX 23 | Arhiv HAZU | Baška | 139 | 31.7 x 21.5 cm | | Deaths 1748–1816 and confirmations 1753–1818. Glagolitic to 1773 then Latinic from 1784. | |
| marriages, souls | | 1748–1816 | IX 21 | Arhiv HAZU | Baška | 159 | 32.5 x 22 cm | | Marriages (1748–1816), souls (1750–1786). Glagolitic to 1784 then Latinic. | |
| souls | | 1748–1783 | br. 1207 | DaZd | Sukošan | 208 p | 28.2 x 9.5 cm | | Glagolitic soul count 1748–1783 (pages 183–208) together with Latinic christenings 1812–1827. | DaZd |
| protocol | | 1748–1750 | br. 38 | Vrbnik (župni ured) | Vrbnik | 78 | 31.5 x 21.5 cm | | Protokol notara Antona Petriša. | |
| matricula | | 1748–1804 | | Arhiv Zadarske nadbiskupije | Sutomišćica | | 21.4 x 21.7 cm | | Matica sv. Fume (Eufemije). Glagolitic except for Latinic on pages 52–54. | |
| | | 1748 (September 26) | Spisi Ninske biskupije, kutija 2, br. 68 | Arhiv Zadarske nadbiskupije | Slivnica | 1 | | | Scribe: don Frane Jović paroch of Slivnica. | |
| marriages | | 1749–1824 | IX 36 | Arhiv HAZU | Ćunski (Lošinj) | 20 | 31 x 18 cm | | Latinic then Italian but with one Glagolitic entry 10 February 1759. | |
| | | 1749–1755 | inv. br. 6 | Baška (župni ured) | Baška | 300 | | | Kopijalna knjiga o pravima klera. Italian with some Glagolitic marginal notes and Glagolitic decree of bishop Zuccheri (f. 280v-281). | |
| marriages | | 1749–1812 | IX 34 | Arhiv HAZU | Beli (Cres) | 40 | 42 x 15 cm | | Italian with 11 Glagolitic entries from 3 February 1749 to 8 November 1750. | FS |
| | | 1749 | br. 14 | Vrbnik (župni ured) | Vrbnik | 16 | 18 x 14 cm | | Police desetine janjaca. | |
| | | 1700s (first decades) | III a 5 (Kuk. 436) | Arhiv HAZU | | 26 | 14.4 x 10.8 cm | | Kvadirnica egzorcizama Antona Frankija. Scribe: Anton Franki of Omišalj, who also wrote Svetosveti koncilij tridentinski in 1712 and was mentioned in 1711 and 1741. Acquired by Kukuljević. | |
| register | | 1700s (first half) | R 3371 (St. sign. SM.32.F.23) | NSK | Baška | 94 | 15.4 x 11 cm | 1 co | Knjiga Viska Tomašića dižmara bašćanskog kapitula. | NSK |
| | | 1700s (first half) | IV a 67 | Arhiv HAZU | Šibenik area? | 10 | 28 x 20.3 cm | | Čudesa koja su se dogodila onim ki se nisu pravo ispovidali. The Štokavskoikavski dialect may point to an origin in the Šibenik area. | |
| | | 1700s (first half) | inv. br. 16 | Poljica (župni ured) | Poljica | 12 | 27.3 x 9.5 cm | | Evidencija vječnih obaveza poljičkog klera. Year 1721 on f. 1 and 1724 on f. 5. | |
| calendar | | 1700s (first half) | br. 13 | Krk (arhiv samostana trećoredaca) | Krk | 39 | 20 x 14 cm | | Liturgijski kalendar-direktorij "žunta". Somewhat older than 1752. | |
| | | 1700s (second quarter) | VII 115 | Arhiv HAZU | | 69 | 14 x 19.8 cm | | Kršćanski nauk (Priolov). Scribes: hamd A f. 1-14 (possibly more than one person), hand B f. 17, 27–29, 30v-41, 42v-47v, hand C f. 17v-26v, 29v-30, 31v-42, 48-67v, hand D 68v-69v. The name of the scribe of hand D was Matij according to his note on f. 4. Hand B writes in the dialect of Vrbnik (or maybe Omišalj). Hand C may have been from Baška on dialectal evidence, which also places hand A in Draga Bašćanska where the manuscript was found. The work may have been the collective work of the clerical school in Krk (town). Acquired by Štefanić who gave it to Arhiv JAZU in 1958. | |
| | | 1750 (before) | VII 111 | Arhiv HAZU | | 19 | 14.3 x 9.5 cm | | Zaklinjanje protiv nevremena i Večernja za mrtve. Scribes: hand A wrote f. 1-16v likely a little before 1750, then by 1750 the book was in the hands of hand B (possibly Mikula Tomašić) who wrote the Večernja za mrtve. Already 1753 it was owned by Frane Frančić who was the desetinar in Baška 1777. Acquired by Vjekoslav Štefanić 1929 in the house of Jure Derenčinović in Draga Bašćanska, donated by him to JAZU in 1958 together with several other manuscripts. | |
| christenings | | 1750–1812 | IX 35 | Arhiv HAZU | Beli (Cres) | 98 | 42 x 15 cm | | Italian with some Glagolitic from 4 hands 13 May 1750 to 6 September 1752. | FS |
| matricula | | 1750–1826 | | Arhiv Zadarske nadbiskupije | Soline, Sali | 60 p | 21.3 x 15.4 cm | 1 co | Glagolitic to 1812 then Latinic. Bibliography: | GUZ, PB |
| | | 1750–1776 | | Omišalj (župni ured) | Omišalj | 112 | 27.5 x 20 cm | | Knjiga prokulatora klera Omišlja. | |
| | | 1750 (February 17) | Spisi Ninske biskupije, kutija 2, br. 69 | Arhiv Zadarske nadbiskupije | Vinjerac | 1 | | | Letter of don Šime Kovačević of Vinjerac to archdeacon Ive Vlatković of Nin. | |
| masses served | | 1750 | IV a 80/43 | Arhiv HAZU | | 2 | 28.3 x 20 cm | | Polica izrečenih misa. Glagolitic one Italian note from 17 July 1750 by priest don Pere Petešić. Glagolitic portion begins 13 June. | |
| homiliary | | 1750 (about) | | Arhiv Zadarske nadbiskupije | Olib | | 21 x 18.6 cm | | Libar propovijedi. Contains 32 homilies. Scribe: likely Šime Radov of Olib (chaplain 1743–1777). | |
| legal | | 1751 (June 23) | br. 782 | Tkon (župni ured) | Tkon | | | | Glagoljska pogodba od 23. VI. 1751. između Tome Papešića p. Stipe iz Murtera i seljana Tkona. Scribe: parish priest Nikola Kolanović. Lost as of 2015. | |
| christenings | | 1751–1752 | | Arhiv Zadarske nadbiskupije | Privlaka | 3 p | 28.5 x 19.5 cm | 1 co | | GUZ, PB |
| matricula | | 1751–1818 | | Sukošan | Sukošan | | 30.6 x 21.6 | | Matricula of the Holy Cross. Glagolitic to 1788, then Latinic. Old matricula lost. Now this one is also lost, as of 2015. | |
| liturgical calendar | CalDub | 1751 | n/a | Monastery of Saint Mary Magdalene in Porat, Krk | Dubašnica, Krk | 61 | 14.5 x 10.5 cm | | Liturgijski kalendar-direktorij 1751. | |
| ledger | | 1752–1797 | | Arhiv Zadarske nadbiskupije | Olib | 56 p | 29.2 x 10.2 cm | 1 co | Kvateran skule gospe Luzarija i gospe Karmena. Glagolitic to 1791 then Latinic. Includes 1 page 20 x 15 cm from a separate lost codex. | GUZ, PB |
| | | 1752–1857 | VIII 164 | Arhiv HAZU | Draga Bašćanska | 118 | 28 x 18.8 cm | | Knjiga bratovštine "od duš od prkatorija" Drage Bašćanske. Glagolitic to 1807 then Latinic. One photograph in Štefanić 1970. | |
| receipts and expenditures | | 1752–1800 | | Arhiv Zadarske nadbiskupije | Sutomišćica | 48 p | 20.5 x 15 cm | | Madrikula Bratovštine svete Fume (prihodi i rashodi). Glagolitic except Latinic on pages 10, 23, 42, 43. | |
| | | 1752–1753 | III a 13 (Kuk. 337) | Arhiv HAZU | Koper | 99 | 17.2 x 10.7 cm | | Žunta za govoriti oficij. Scribe: Dominik Zec. After the closure of the Franciscan monastery in Koper in 1806 it was brought to Krk by a monk. Includes several notes by a later hand in Latinic and Glagolitic by Mate Linardić (i.e. Latinic on f. 91). So specifically brought to the monastery in Dubašnica. Acquired by Kukuljević on Krk from Petar Bogović. One photograph in Štefanić 1970. Bibliography: | |
| protocol | | 1752–1754 | Glagolitica 7.11 | Croatian State Archives | Dubašnica | 202 | | | Drugi protokol notara Jurja Sormilića iz Dubašnice. | IzSt (2008) |
| calendar | | 1752 | sign. 5 (old F VIII 37/7) | Krk (arhiv samostana trećoredaca) | Krk | 83 | 17.2 x 11 cm | | Liturgijski kalendar-direktorij sa "žuntom". | |
| matricula | | 1753 – after 1949 | | Arhiv Zadarske nadbiskupije | Kukljica | 116 p | 31.5 x 21.8 cm | 1 co | Madrikula sv. Duha. Glagolitic to 1821 then Latinic. One of the last manuscripts with Glagolitic to be used for records. Lost as of 2015. | GUZ, PB |
| miscellany | | 1753, 1762 | | Košljun or Deković library | Košljun | 51 | 20.3 x 14 cm | | Kazuistički zbornik Bara Fargačića (Bartola Frgačića). Scribe: Bare Fargačić. Acquired by Deković family of Rijeka from the remains of the Jakominić family of Dobrinj. | |
| deaths | | 1753–1823 | | Arhiv Zadarske nadbiskupije | Gorica (Gornje Raštane) | 1753–1823 | 50 p | 28.3 x 10 cm | Glagolitic to 1809 then Latinic. | GUZ, PB |
| receipts and expenditures | | 1753–1820 | | Arhiv Zadarske nadbiskupije | Sutomišćica | 56 p | 20.5 x 15 cm | | Glagoljska madrikula Bratovštine duš od purgatorija (prihodi i rashodi). | |
| matricula | | 1753–1862 | | Arhiv Zadarske nadbiskupije | Žman | 62 p | 23.8 x 16.5 cm | 1 co | Madrikula Bratovrštine svetoga Sakramenta. Glagolitic then Italian. Discovered among the writings of Nedo Grbin. | GUZ, PB |
| matricula | | 1753–1818 | | Arhiv Zadarske nadbiskupije | Sukošan | 118 p | 33 x 15 cm | 1 co | Matricula of Saint Martin. Glagolitic to 1783 then Latinic. Brotherhood was not abolished by French administration. Bibliography: | GUZ, PB |
| matricula | | 1753–1810 | | Arhiv Zadarske nadbiskupije | Veli Iž | 88 p | 32.5 x 11 cm | 1 co | Madrikula sv. Roka. Glagolitic excepting a few Latinic in a few places. | GUZ, PB |
| christenings | | 1754–1829 | | Arhiv Zadarske nadbiskupije | Gorica (Gornje Raštane) | 124 p | 28.4 x 10 cm | 1 co | | GUZ, PB |
| protocol | | 1754–1759 | Glagolitica 7.12 | Croatian State Archives | Dubašnica | 296 | | | Treći protokol notara Jurja Sormilića iz Dubašnice. Begins 6 December 1754. | IzSt (2008) |
| | | 1754 | | Krk (arhiv stolnog kaptola) | Krk | 80 | 38.7 x 14.3 cm | | Abecedary of Ivan Kraljić (Slovnik Ivana Kraljića). Scribe: Ivan Kraljić. | |
| | | 1754 | VII 22 | Arhiv HAZU | | 26 | 14.3 x 10 cm | | "Činь umrvšimь". Uses Karaman orthography. Latin note 15 October 1754 shows the manuscript was intended for the press. Acquired by JAZU with Milčetić remains in 1948. Acquired by Milčetić on Krk. Milčetić acquired it from Vinko Premuda. One photograph in Štefanić 1970. | |
| matricula | | 1755 – after 1949 | | Kukljica (župni ured) | Kukljica | 13 p | 31.5 x 20 cm | | Madrikula Duš Purgatorija. Glagolitic to 1810 then Latinic. One of the last manuscripts with Glagolitic to be used for records. Lost as of 2015. | |
| mass legates register | | 1755–1874 | | Arhiv Zadarske nadbiskupije | Olib | 140 p | 43.3 x 15.8 cm | 1 co | Libar legatov u Olibu. Glagolitic to 1795 then Latinic. | GUZ, PB |
| matricula | | 1755–1818 | | Arhiv Zadarske nadbiskupije | Dragove | 104 p | 27 x 9.3 cm | 1 co | Matricula of the Brotherhood of Souls of Purgatory (Skula Duš Purgatorija). Glagolitic to 1801 then Latinic. | GUZ, PB |
| | | 1755 (January 11) | Spisi Ninske biskupije, posebna kutija, bez signature | Arhiv Nadbiskupije zadarske | | | | | Complaint of the people of Nadin against priest Marko Magazin. | |
| protocol | | 1755 | Glagolitica 8.13 | Croatian State Archives | Dubašnica | 28 | | | Koncept protokola notara Jurja Sormilića iz Dubašnice. 11 May – 11 November 1775. | IzSt (2008: shared with 8.14) |
| confirmations | | 1756–1848 | | Arhiv Zadarske nadbiskupije | Kožino | 168 p | 30.8 x 10 cm | 1 co | Glagolitic to around 1784 then Latinic. Earliest transition to Latinic in Zadar bishopric. | GUZ, PB |
| christenings, confirmations, marriages, deaths | | 1756–1793 | IX 11 | Arhiv HAZU | Dobrinj | 232 | 31 x 21.5 cm | | Christenings (1757–1792), confirmations (1756–1790), marriages (1757–1793), deaths (1758–1793). Glagolitic with some Latinic in 1790. | |
| confirmations | | 1756–1840, 1843–1850 | br. 44 | Vrbnik (župni ured) | Vrbnik | 29 | 42.5 x 30 cm | | Glagolitic to 1802 then Italian. | |
| marriages | | 1756–1784 | | Arhiv Zadarske nadbiskupije | Privlaka | 8 | 28.5 x 19.5 cm | 1 co | 3 entries at the start Glagolitic, rest Latinic. | GUZ, PB |
| protocol | | 1756–1761 | Glagolitica 9.17 | Croatian State Archives | Dobrinj | 276 | | | Notarski protokol notara Ivana Prašnića iz Dobrinja. Fire damage. | IzSt (2008) |
| curses | | 1756? | VII 49 | Arhiv HAZU | Baška | 36 | 14.5 x 10.2 cm | | Sveščić zaklinjanja. Main scribe named Petar. Probably written 1756. Acquired by Milčetić after 1911. Entered JAZU 1948 with remains of Premuda to whom Milčetić must have loaned it. | |
| christenings | | 1757–1813 | inv. br. 1 | Državni arhiv u Zadru | Arbanasi | | 29.6 x 10.5 cm | | Glagolitic on pages 1–4 (christenings of the church of Saint Luke in Prkos by Škabrnja), corresponding to 1760–1761, and on pages 105–117, corresponding to 1801–1814. Rest in Croatian Latinic except for Glagolitic on pages 6–8 (years 1760 and 1761), 105-117 (years 1801–1814). | DaZd, FS |
| mass legates register | | 1757–1803 | inv. br. 19 | Bogovići, Krk | Dubašnica, Krk | 149 | 38.5 x 14.5 cm | | Registar misnih legata dubašljanskoga kapitula. Completely Glagolitic with some Italian interspersed. | |
| | | 1757–1843 | | DaZd | Žman | 28 p | 25 x 19 cm | | Kvateran crkve sv. Ivana Krstitelja. Glagolitic with some Latinic. | |
| | | 1757 (June 15) | Spisi Ninske biskupije, kutija III, br. 54/55 | Arhiv Zadarske nadbiskupije | Nadin | | | | Prvi ženidbeni spis popa Marka Kadia 1757. | |
| | | 1757 (September 16) | Spisi Ninske biskupije, kutija III, br. 58/59 | Arhiv Zadarske nadbiskupije | Nadin | | | | Drugi ženidbeni spis popa Marka Kadia 1757. | |
| | | 1757 (September 20) | Spisi Ninske biskupije, kutija III, br. 60/61 | Arhiv Zadarske nadbiskupije | Nadin | | | | Treći ženidbeni spis popa Marka Kadia 1757. | |
| | | 1757 (November 12) | Spisi Ninske biskupije, kutija III, br. 65 | Arhiv Zadarske nadbiskupije | Nadin | | | | Ženidbeni spis popa Marka Kadia o Petru i Matiji. | |
| | | 1757 (about) | Spisi Ninske biskupije, kutija V, br. 56 | Arhiv Zadarske nadbiskupije | Nadin | | | | Ženidbeni spis popa Marka Kadia o Pavlu i Jerci. | |
| | | 1757 (about) | Spisi Ninske biskupije, kutija V, br. 55 | Arhiv Zadarske nadbiskupije | Nadin | | | | Ženidbeni spis popa Marka Kadia 1757 o Jurju i Anici. | |
| legal | | 1758 (March 5) | R 3358 | Zagreb (NSK) | Dubašnica | 1 | | | Mikula Galante pok. Jure zamjenjuje svoj vrt za dva kusa zemljišta vlasništvo Ivana Devčića pk. Antona. Scribe: Ivan Sormilić. | GHR, NSK |
| legal | | 1758 (October 11) | Glagolitica II-52 | HDA | Zadar | | | | Zadarski knez nalaže sucima Dobre Poljane da seljaci urede masline i obrađuju zemlje što ih drže u zakupu od Fafunića, a koje su zapustili obrađivati. Italian translation and Glagolitic note on reverse. | IzSt (2008) |
| | | 1758 (November 19) | Spisi Ninske biskupije, kutija III, br. 76 | Arhiv Zadarske nadbiskupije | Nadin | | | | Ženidbeni spis popa Marka Kadia 1758. | |
| | | 1758 (before December 25) | VIII 183 | Arhiv HAZU | Baška | 4 | 30 x 10..5 cm | | | |
| marriages, deaths | | 1759–1763, 1767–1816 | br. 42 | Vrbnik (župni ured) | Vrbnik | 88 | 31.5 x 22 cm | | Marriages 1767–1816, deaths 1767–1816. Glagolitic to 1807 then Latinic. | |
| | | 1759–1801 | br. 11 | Vrbnik (župni ured) | Vrbnik | 158 | 30.2 x 21.8 cm | | Kapitulska knjiga instrumenata. Mostly Glagolitic, some Italian. | |
| protocol | | 1759–1763 | | HDA | | | | | Četvrti notarski protokol Ivana Sormilića. | |
| | | 1759 (November 4) | Spisi Ninske biskupije, kutija III, br. 82/83 | Arhiv Zadarske nadbiskupije | Nadin | | | | Ženidbeni spis popa Marka Kadia 1759. | |
| annerversaries | | 1760–1818 | | Arhiv Zadarske nadbiskupije | Ždrelac | | 21.6 x 12.5 cm | | Libar godova. Completely Glagolitic. Transcribed by parish priest Pave Maras from chronicle with oldest entry 1750. Most records for Ždrelac made at Banj. | |
| ledger | | 1760–1798 | | Galevac (Samostan sv. Pavla) | Zaglav (Samostan sv. Mihovila) | 86 p | 31 x 22.5 cm | | Blagajnički dnevnik 1760–1798. Completely Glagolitic. | |
| directory | DirAnt | 1760 (about) | R 3377 | NSK | Krk | 48+119 | 14 x 9.8 cm | 1 co | Žunta Antuna Šintića. By scribe Antun Šintić. | NSK |
| | | 1760 | Spisi Ninske biskupije, kutija III, br. 94 | Arhiv Zadarske nadbiskupije | Nadin | | | | Ženidbeni spis popa Marka Kadia 1760. | |
| christenings | | 1761–1826, 1819 | Inv. br. 1138 | Državni arhiv Zadar | Slivnica | 88 p | | | Glagolitic to 1771, Latinic from 1769. | DaZd, FS |
| christenings | | 1761–1805, 1808, 1818 | br. 1206 | DaZd | Sukošan | 332 p | 27.8 x 10 cm | | Glagolitic to 1783 then Latinic, with some Latinic from 1769, and Italian in 1767, 1771, 1774. Cyrillic sometimes used in 1779 and 1780. Sporadic Glagolitic until 1792. | DaZd, FS |
| christenings | | 1761–1793 | | Arhiv Zadarske nadbiskupije | Poličnik | 76 p | 31 x 23 cm | 1 co | Latinic with 1 Glagolitic entry on p 45 from 1783. | GUZ, PB |
| deaths | | 1761–1833 | | Arhiv Zadarske nadbiskupije | Vrgada | 112 p | 28 x 10.4 cm | 1 co | Glagolitic to 1811 then Latinic from 1812. Deaths from 23 October 1761 to 14 October 1777 discovered first, previously placed inside christenings register. In 1959 the rest was found. Parish priest was Martin Mihić during the transition to Latinic. The part through 1777 survives, but the part discovered in 1959 that continues to 1833 has been lost as of Kero 2015. | 1761–1777: GUZ, PB, FS, 1777-: ? |
| calendar | | 1761 | br. 7 | Krk (arhiv samostana trećoredaca) | Krk | 60 | 14 x 9 cm | | "Žunta", Liturgijski direktorij i drugo. Three hands: A p. 1-30, B p. 31-96, C end. | |
| notice | | 1761 (before April 26) | R 6756 | NSK | Prvić Luka | 1 | | | Obavijest braći franjevcima da će se kongregacija provincije održati u samostanu sv. Ivana u Zadru 26.IV.1761. By Karlo Antun Radić. | NSK, GHR |
| christenings, marriages, deaths | | 1762, 1766–1835 | | Arhiv Zadarske nadbiskupije | Poljica | 119 | 27.5 x 19.5 cm | | Christenings 1762 and 1766–1835, marriages 1786–1832, deaths 1792–1835. Latinic with Glagolitic on 1, 8r, 11r, 19v, 23r. | |
| christenings | | 1762, 1821 | | Arhiv Zadarske nadbiskupije | Suhovare | 4 p | 23.5 x 9.5 cm | 1 co | Glagolitic in 1762 but Latinic in 1821. | GUZ, PB |
| deaths | | 1762–1817 | | Arhiv Zadarske nadbiskupije | Islam Latinski | 45 p | 28 x 16 cm | 1 co | Latinic with Glagolitic on 2v, 3r, 7v, 8, 9v, 104. | GUZ, PB |
| | | 1762–1818 | br. 12 | Vrbnik (župni ured) | Vrbnik | 233 | 32 x 23.3 cm | | Kapitulska knjiga instrumenata o zakupima. Glagolitic and Italian. | |
| | | 1762–1789 | | Zagreb (Arhiv Provincijalata franjevaca trećoredaca) | Zaglav | 18 | 29.4 x 9.8 cm | | | |
| | | 1762 (May 9) | Spisi Ninske biskupije, kutija III, br. 105 | Arhiv Zadarske nadbiskupije | Nadin | | | | Ženidbeni spis popa Marka Kadija 1762. | |
| | | 1762 (about) | Spisi Ninske biskupije, kutija V, br. 28 | Arhiv Zadarske nadbiskupije | Nadin | | | | Ženidbeni spis popa Marka Kazia o Matiji i Marku. | |
| ledger | | 1762? | VII 65 | Arhiv HAZU | Baška | 188 | 14 x 9.7 cm | | Dižmarska knjiga bašćanskog kapitula. Scribe mainly priest Miho Čubranić of Jurandvor. First noticed by Štefanić 1934 in the archive of the župni ured in Draga Bašćanska, transferred 1948 to JAZU together with Premuda library. | |
| | | 1762 (February 28) | IV a 80/56 | Arhiv HAZU | | 1 | 19.5 x 14 cm | | Priznanica Kalcinovih. | |
| protocol | | 1763–1769 | br. 39 | Vrbnik (župni ured) | Vrbnik | 179 | 31 x 21 cm | | Treći protokol notara Antona Petriša (mlađeg). In arhiv krčkog kotarskog suda until after WWI. | |
| | | 1763 | inv. br. 11 | Baška (župni ured) | Baška | 6 | | | Azbučni indeks II i III kapitulske knjige. | |
| will | | 1763 | R 3358 | NSK | | 1 | | | Juštaman dice pok. Ivana Uravića kod diobe baštine. Scribe: priest Mikula D. | GHR, NSK |
| matricula | | 1764–1892 | | Arhiv Zadarske nadbiskupije | Rava | 24 p | 26.5 x 10.5 cm | 1 co | Glagoljska Madrikula sv. Roka. Glagolitic to 1811 then Latinic. | GUZ, PB |
| ledger | | 1764–1813, 1828 | inv. br. 24 | Baška (župni ured) | Baška | 166 | 30.8 x 21.5 cm | | Knjiga računa Gospoje od Karmene. Glagolitic to 1796 then Latinic then Italian. | |
| | | 1764 (November 13) | Spisi Ninske biskupije, kutija III, br. 125 | Arhiv Zadarske nadbiskupije | Nadin | | | | Ženidbeni spis viceparoka dona Vida Martinovića. | |
| homily | | 1764 | R 4344 | NSK | Croatia | 6 | 29 x 20 cm | | Predika za mladu mašu. | NSK |
| intended masses | | 1764–1777 | | Monastery of Saint Mary Magdalene in Porat, Krk | Dubašnica, Krk | 42 | 28.8 x 9.3 cm | | A part of the book. | |
| deed | | 1764 (March 3) | Glagolitica II-53 | HDA | Dubašnica | | | | Luca, žena pok. Gamete iz Poljida, prodaje Dolac Pavlu Milčetiću. Two later notes added. | IzSt (2008) |
| legal | | 1764 (April 8) | R 3358 | NSK | | 1 | | 1 co | Juštamenat, baštinika pok. Ivana Uravića i žene mu Lucije o zemljišnom posjedu. Scribe: deacon Mikula Ilić. | GHR, NSK |
| christenings | | 1765–1855 | br. 793 | DaZd | Pašman (town) | 436 p | 29.3 x 9.6 cm | | Glagolitic to 1821 inclusive then Latinic. | DaZd, FS |
| christenings | | 1765–1830 | | Arhiv Zadarske nadbiskupije | Murvica | 86 p | 40 x 14.5 cm | | Glagolitic on pages 3–40 then Latinic from 1805 on. | |
| christenings | | 1765–1802, 1834–1837 | br. 1038 | DaZd | Sestrunj | | 28.9 x 10.4 cm | | Glagolitic to 1802 then Latinic from 1834, with gap. | DaZd, FS |
| christenings | | 1765–1836 (or 1765–1827) | br. 870 | DaZd | Preko | 316 p | 27.7 x 9.9 cm | | Glagolitic to 1822 then Latinic. Latinic also 1786–1788. | DaZd, FS |
| marriages | | 1765–1815 | IX 5 | Arhiv HAZU | Ponikve (Kornić-Vrh) | 31 p | | | Glagolitic then Latinic. | FS |
| marriages | | 1765–1827 | | Arhiv Zadarske nadbiskupije | Murvica | 48 p | 38.4 x 14 cm | | Glagolitic on pages 1–18 then Latinic. | |
| marriages | | 1765–1824 | | Arhiv Zadarske nadbiskupije | Grusi (Briševo) | | 30 x 10.8 cm | | Glagolitic f 1-31, 40, remainder Latinic. | |
| deaths | | 1765–1815 | IX 6 | Arhiv HAZU | Ponikve (Kornić-Vrh) | 42 | 28.8 x 19 cm | | Glagolitic to 1792 then Latinic. | FS |
| deaths | | 1765–1799 | br. 1213 | DaZd | Sukošan | 152 p | 27.8 x 9.8 cm | | Glagolitic to 1784 then Latinic, with some Latinic 1778–1780. Final Glagolitic entry 1792. | DaZd, FS |
| deaths | | 1765–1825 | br. 1251 | DaZd | Sutomišćica | 210 p | 27.9 x 9.9 cm | | Glagolitic to 1812 then Latinic. Covered Preko as well until 1770. | DaZd, FS |
| marriages | | 1765–1826 | | Arhiv Zadarske nadbiskupije | Mali Iž | 44 p | 29.1 x 10 cm | 1 co | Glagolitic to 1806 then Latinic. | GUZ, PB |
| receipts and expenditures | | 1765–1803 | | Arhiv Zadarske nadbiskupije | Sutomišćica | 80 p | 20 x 7.5 cm | | Knjiga primitaka i izdataka Bratovštine Sv. Sakramenta. | |
| | | 1765–1847 | | Galevac (Samostan sv. Pavla) | Galevac | 67 p | 28.4 x 11.2 cm | | Knjiga zadušnica za preminule redovnike Samostana sv. Pavla na Školjiću (Galevac). Glagolitic with one Italian note. | |
| protocol | | 1765–1773 | 20 | Dobrinj (župni ured) | Vrbnik, Baška, Dobrinj | 113 | 31 x 22 cm | | Notarski protokol Antona Petriša. Scribe: Anton Petriš. | |
| ledger | | 1765 | VII 62 | Arhiv HAZU | Baška | 191 | 15.5 x 10 cm | | Dižmarska knjiga bašćanskog kapitula. One photograph in Štefanić 1970. | |
| | | 1765–1782 | br. 9 | Vrbnik (župni ured) | Vrbnik | 18 | 31 x 21.5 cm | | Fragment kapitulske knjige instrumenata. | |
| ledger | | 1765–1776 | inv. br. 16 | Baška (župni ured) | Baška | 200 | 31.5 x 22 cm | | Knjiga računa kapitulskog dižmara. | |
| ledger | | 1765–1766 | | Krk (arhiv bivšeg Staroslavenskog instituta) | Vrbnik | 40 | 28 x 10 cm | | Dižmarska bilježnica (polica) vrbanskog klera. Paper. Wrapped in parchment folio of a 14th-century Glagolitic breviary. | |
| | | 1765–1838 | | Porat (samostan) | Dubašnica | 20 | 28.5 x 9.5 cm | | Gospodarska bilježnica o stoci. Completely Glagolitic. | |
| mass register | | 1766–1801 | | Galevac (Samostan sv. Pavla) | Rava | 110 p | 28.2 x 10.5 cm | | Knjiga izrečenih misa za pok. Lombarda Soppe. | |
| ledger | | 1766–1784 | | Arhiv Zadarske nadbiskupije | Olib | 32 p | 29 x 10 cm | 1 co | Kvateran prokuraturov župne crkve u Olibu. Glagolitic to 1776 then Latinic. | GUZ, PB |
| christenings | | 1766–1825 | | Arhiv Zadarske nadbiskupije | Seline | 154 p | 29 x 10 cm | 1 co | Glagolitic to 1778 then Latinic. | GUZ, PB |
| souls | | 1766–1825 | | Arhiv Zadarske nadbiskupije | Murvica | 44 p | 38 x 14 cm | | Glagolitic on pages 1–6 and Latinic on 6–7. | |
| deaths | | 1766–1824 | | Arhiv Zadarske nadbiskupije | Murvica | 44 p | 38.4 x 14 cm | | Glagolitic on pages 1 and 3-39 inclusive then Latinic. | |
| | | 1766–1809 | | Pašman (župni ured) | Pašman (town) | 128 p | 28.3 x 10 cm | | Completely Glagolitic. | |
| matricula | | 1766–1815 | inv. br. 26 | Baška (župni ured) | Batomalj | 43 | 34 x 11.5 cm | | Knjiga bratovštine duša od čistilišta u Batomlju. Glagolitic to 1800 then Latinic and Italian from shortly after that. | |
| | | 1766–1798 | inv. br. 6 | Draga Bašćanska (župni ured) | Draga Bašćanska | 33 | 27.5 x 20 cm | | Knjiga isprava bratovštine duša od čistilišta. Glagolitic notes dated 1768, 1774, 1776–1780, 1781, 1796–1798. | |
| | | 1766 | br. 12 | Krk (arhiv samostana trećoredaca) | Krk | 19 | 14.8 x 10 cm | | Liturgijski dodatak: molitve novim svecima. Paper. Same hand as one of the hands of br. 5 of same archive. | |
| ritual | | 1767, 1773 | VIII 114 | Arhiv HAZU | Krk (island) | 10 | 19.5 x 14 cm | | Neki franjevački obredi. Scribe: fra Mikula Milohnić on Krk. Glagolitic with Latinic on f. 6–8 by a different hand in 1828, not by Vicenc Hrabrić of Baška who did own it (and also owned VII 21 as a deacon in 1808). Acquired by Milčetić in Baška. Given to JAZU by Milčetić. | |
| protocol | | 1767–1768 | IV a 109 | Arhiv HAZU | | 31 | 28.5 x 20 cm | | Komad notarskog protokola (koncepta) Ivana Sormilića. | |
| | | 1767–1858 | Libro V | Dobrinj (župni ured) | Dobrinj | 133 | 31.5 x 22 cm | | Kapitulska knjiga: isprave (g. 1767–1786) i Evidencija prihoda (1793–1858). Glagolitic to 1804 then Italian. | |
| matricula | | 1767–1816 | | Arhiv Zadarske nadbiskupije | Banj | 82 p | 28 x 18.6 cm | 1 co | Madrikula s. Križa. Completely Glagolitic. | GUZ, PB |
| matricula | | 1767–1818 | | Pašman (župni ured) | Pašman (town) | 102 p | 35.8 x 26.9 cm | | Madrikula s. Antona opata. Includes transcription of 1519 Pravila. Glagolitic to 1810 then Latinic. Lost as of 2015. | |
| matricula | | 1767–1817 | | Pašman (župni arhiv) | Pašman | 386 p | 25.5 x 19 cm | | Madrikula Sv. Marka u Pašmanu. Completely Glagolitic. Copied around 1767 from original begun 1703. | |
| | | 1767–1801 | inv. br. 4 | Draga Bašćanska (župni ured) | Draga Bašćanska | 202 | 21.7 x 15.5 cm | | Knjiga bratovštine duša od čistilišta: primici i izdaci. Completely Glagolitic. | |
| debts | | 1767–1804 | | Arhiv Zadarske nadbiskupije | Sutomišćica | 76 p | 24.4 x 8.5 cm | | Libar di se pišu oni ki fale i ki ostaju dužni. | |
| protocol | | 1769–1792 | Glagolitica 8.14 | HDA | Dubašnica | 258 | | | Notarski protokol notara Ivana/Jurja Sormilića iz Dubašnice. Begins 25 January 1769. | IzSt (2008: shared with 8.13) |
| protocol | | 1769–1771 | | HDA | Vrbnik | | | | Komad notarskog protokola Antona Petriša mlađeg. It was in the Kotarski sud in Krk until it was given to the Državni arhiv Zagreb in 1931. | |
| protocol | | 1769–1772, 1774–1775 | knjiga 15–16 | HDA | Dubašnica | 30 | | | Notarski protokol notara iz Dubašnice Ivana Sormilića (1769–1772) and Koncept protokola notara Ivan Sormilića iz Dubašnice (24. studenoga 1774. - 1. svibnja 1775). | |
| | | 1769–1785, 1789 | 16 | Dobrinj (župni ured) | Dobrinj | 150 | 28 x 30 cm | | Knjiga bratovštine Gospe od Loreta. Glagolitic to 1789 but with some Italian translations of prior material after 1780. | |
| matricula | | 1769–1819 | inv. br. 27 | Baška (župni ured) | Batomalj | 42 | 34 x 11.5 cm | | Druga knjiga bratovštine duša od čistilišta u Batomlju. Glagolitic to 1807 then Latinic, with Italian. | |
| christenings | | 1768–1801 | | Arhiv Zadarske nadbiskupije | Galovac | 86 p | 28.3 x 9.6 cm | 1 co | Glagolitic to 1789 then Latinic to the end of 1796 then Glagolitic April 1797 to 1801. | GUZ, PB, FS |
| matricula | | 1768–1829 | inv. br. 25 | Baška (župni ured) | Jurandvor | 59 | 31 x 22 cm | | Knjiga bratovštine duša od čistišta u Jurandvoru. Glagolitic to 1805 then Latinic with some Italian. | |
| matricula | | 1768–1803 | | Arhiv Zadarske nadbiskupije | Diklo | 34 | 29.5 x 20.5 cm | | Madrikula Bratovštine Gospe od Lužarija. Glagolitic and Latinic. | |
| | | 1768 | Spisi Ninske biskupije, kutija 2, br. 55 | Arhiv Zadarske nadbiskupije | Vrsi | 1 | | | Kopija od karsta na 1768 u Varsi. A 1768 copy by don Frane Jivosić paroch in Vrsi of a christening from 10 August 1739. | |
| memorials for deceased brothers | | 1769–1860 | | Monastery of Saint Mary Magdalene in Porat, Krk | Dubašnica, Krk | 85 | 28.5 x 10.3 cm | | Knjiga zadušnica za umrlu braću. Glagolitic to 1840 and even 1843. Then Latinic and Italian. | |
| births | | 1769–1836 | inv. br. 2 | DaZd | Arbanasi | 116 p | 28 x 10 cm | | Latinic with Glagolitic for 1802–1804 (pages 21–27). | DaZd, |
| | | 1769–1849 | | Arhiv Zadarske nadbiskupije | Rava | 242 p | 27.2 x 19.9 cm | | Glagoljska Kopija iz libra kvaterna. Glagolitic to 1810 then Latinic and Italian. Some transcriptions from earlier (1481 and 1666). | GUZ, PB |
| marriages | | 1770–1826 | br. 873 | DaZd | Preko | 63 p | 27.5 x 9.8 cm | | Glagolitic to 1821 then Latinic. Latinic also 1787–1788. | DaZd, FS |
| annerversaries | | ~1770 – 1845 | | Silba (župni arhiv) | Silba | | 30.6 x 22 cm | | Libar godov u Silbi. Transcribed around 1770 by Matij Soko of Silba from a chronicle begun 1601. Continued in Glagolitic to 1809 then Latinic. | |
| matricula | | 1770–1819 | | Arhiv Zadarske nadbiskupije | Preko | 126 p | 28.2 x 20.3 cm | 1 co | Matricula of the Brotherhood of Souls of Purgatory (Skula duš od Purgatorija). Glagolitic to 1804 then Latinic. Latinic also sporadically 1794–1804. | GUZ, PB |
| deaths | | 1770–1827 | br. 875 | DaZd | Preko | 202 p | 27.9 x 9.7 cm | | Glagolitic to 1821 then Latinic (Latinic also 1786–1788). Latinic also 1786–1788. | DaZd, FS |
| deaths (of children) | | 1770–1824 | | | Sutomišćica | 116 p | | | Umrli dijetovi. | FS |
| | | 1770 | | Arhiv Zadarske nadbiskupije | Kožino | | 31.2 x 20.8 cm | 1 co | Bratovštine Kotara Duha Svetoga 1764–1850. Latinic with Glagolitic confirmations in 1770 from don Gašpar Šarić in Murvica on page 16 and together with don Mark on 17. | PB |
| | | 1770–1791, 1812–1821 | VII 51 | Arhiv HAZU | Baška | 16 | 14.5 x 10 cm | | Gospodarska bilježnica iz Baške. Glagolitic to 1791 then Latinic from 1812. Glagolitic scribe: priest Pere Hrabrić. Acquired by JAZU with Premuda library in 1948. | |
| miscellany/annerversaries | COlb | 1771–1860 | | Arhiv Zadarske nadbiskupije | Olib | 394 p | 27 x 19.5 cm | | Knjiga godova. Rebound by I. Pulišić in 1938. Original for first part began 1480, but it was transcribed into the present codex in 1771 by chaplain I. Petričević of Olib. Glagolitic to 1829 then Latinic except for Glagolitic in 1851 and 1852. Bibliography: | 1: GUZ, PB, 2: GUZ, PB |
| register | | 1771–1779 | Glagolitica I-9 | Croatian State Archives | Porozina | 1 | 27.5 x 19.5 cm | | Bilješke o vraćenim starim dugovima samostana Sv. Mikule na Porozini. Acquired by HDA from Fanfogna-Garagnin library. Microfilm made April 1985 by Arhiv Hrvatske (which kept a copy G-1 (ZM 30/17)) for Staroslavenski institut. | IzSt (2008) |
| | | 1771–1783 | II d 119/2 (Kuk. 316) | Arhiv HAZU | | 65 | 27.7 x 19 cm | | Kopijalna knjiga Ivana Sabljića (notar Ivan Sormilić) 1771–1783. One photograph in Štefanić 1970. | |
| christenings | | 1772–1828 | | Arhiv Zadarske nadbiskupije | Rava | 128 p | 28 x 10 cm | 1 co | Glagolitic to 1813 then Latinic, but in 1800 and 1801 there is also Latinic. | GUZ, PB |
| matricula | | 1772–1816 | | Arhiv Zadarske nadbiskupije | Tkon | 138 p | 32 x 23 cm | 1 co | Madrikula Bratovštine Gospe sedam žalosti. Glagolitic with some Latinic on pages 4, 5–7. | GUZ, PB |
| cadastre | | 1772–1818 | br. 17 | Vrbnik (župni ured) | Vrbnik | 37 | 31 x 22.5 cm | | Katastik kapele sv. Mavra. Latinic, Italian, Glagolitic. Generally Glagolitic earlier. | |
| song | | 1772 | IV a 71 (IV a 103) | Arhiv HAZU | Zadar | 28 | 14 x 10.5 cm | | Plač Blažene Gospe (Divkovićev). Scribe: Ante Raspović of Zadar (the Glagolitic part). Includes Latinic names of students written in the first years of the 19th century in Lukoran on Ugljan and a Glagolitic note from 25 December 1812 by Martin Milin. | IzSt (2008) |
| | | 1772–1784 | inv. br. 3 | Bogovići (župni ured) | Dubašnica | 20 | 28.5 x 20 cm | | Kapitulska knjiga: kupoprodaje i najmovi. Begins 28 May 1772, ends 21 September 1783. Scribe: Ivan Sormilić. | |
| | | 1772–1822 | inv. br. 5 | Draga Bašćanska (župni ured) | Draga Bašćanska | 78 | 21.7 x 15.5 cm | | Knjiga bratovštine duša od čistilišta: primici i izdaci. Glagolitic to 1804, Latinic from 1808. | |
| christenings | | 1773 | | Arhiv Zadarske nadbiskupije | Murvica | 1 | 28 x 10 cm | | Glagolitic on page 1 and half of page 2 then Latinic. | |
| | | 1773, 1776 | Osor collection CVII | Krk | Osor | ~150 | | | Miscellanea. Latinic volume with 2 Glagolitic letters from 1773 and 1776. | |
| marriages | | 1773–1825 | Inv. br. 275 | DaZd | Sveti Filip i Jakov | 36 p | | | Glagolitic to 1779, Latinic from 1780. | FS |
| | | 1773–1806, 1814 | 21 | Dobrinj (župni ured) | Dobrinj | 19 | 28 x 19.8 cm | | Komad kopijalne knjige Mikule Šaltori. Glagolitic to 1806 with Italian note 1814. Scribes: Ivan Prašnić, Ivan Sormilić, Ivan Kirinčić. | |
| | | 1773–1793 | inv. br. 2 | Draga Bašćanska (župni ured) | Draga Bašćanska | 38 | 29 x 10 cm | | Registar zakladnih misa bratovštine duša od čistilišta. | |
| inventory | | 1773 | Garanjin-Fanfonja fond, Glagolitika | Državni arhiv u Splitu | Božava | 4 | 24.7 x 19.7 cm | | Razni popisi (žita, sira ...). | |
| homily | | 1773 (September 24) | IV a 80/40 | Arhiv HAZU | | 2 | 20 x 14.5 cm | | Nacrt propovijedi o praštanju. Scribe: Šimun Lantanović in Zadar. Written for don Ive Vlahić who was the vice parish priest or parish priest in Sutomišćica. | |
| deed confirmation | | 1773 | | Omišalj (župni arhiv) | Krk (town) | | | | Knez Ivan VII Frankapan potvrđuje da je Omišljanima prodao livadu i pasište Rt. Original dated 29 October 1453, lost. Survives in Glagolitic copy from 1773 on page 1 of the 44 folio Comun di Castel Muschio contro La Scuola di S. Ma. Maggiore di dto Luogo. | |
| register | | 1774 | Glagolitica I-8 | HDA | Porozina | 6 | 27.7 x 18.9 cm | | Bilješke o svim livelima po mjesecima samostna Sv. Mikule na Porozini. Acquired by HDA from Fanfogna-Garanin library. Microfilm made April 1985 by Arhiv Hrvatske (which kept a copy G-1 (ZM 30/17)), given to Staroslavenski institut (M 222/17h). | IzSt (2008) |
| christenings, confirmations | | 1774–1806 | IX 25 | Arhiv HAZU | Omišalj | 100 | 32 x 21.5 cm | | Christenings 1774–1806 and confirmations 1780. Completely Glagolitic. | FS |
| marriages | | 1774–1815 | IX 27 | Arhiv HAZU | Omišalj | 70 | 31 x 21.7 cm | | Glagolitic to 1812 then Latinic. | FS |
| deaths | | 1774–1815 | IX 28 | Arhiv HAZU | Omišalj | 96 | 31 x 21.6 cm | | Glagolitic to 1812 then Latin. | |
| annerversaries | | 1774–1833 | inv. br. 22 | Baška (župni ured) | Baška | 15 | 32 x 11 cm | | Knjiga godova. Glagolitic (Karaman orthography) to transitional period 1810–1812 then Latinic to 1833. | |
| protocol | | 1774.XI.24-1.V.1775 | Glagolitica 8.15-16, 9.15-16 | HDA | Dubašnica | 30 | | | Koncept protokola notara Jurja Sormilića iz Dubašnice. | IzSt (2008) |
| homily | | 1774 | br. 37 | Krk (arhiv samostana trećoredaca) | Krk | 10 | 19.5 x 14 cm | | Propovijed "Od griha" fra Jacinta Milohnića. Glagolitic with Latin quotations. Štokavised language. | |
| letter | | 1774 (September 17) | II br. 234 | Šibenik (Gradski muzej) | Šepurina | | | | Pismo Tomice, žene Mate Petkovića. Scribe: fra Juraj Tomić. | |
| homily | | 1700s (third quarter) | inv. br. 29 | Baška (župni ured) | | 4 | 21.5 x 15 cm | | Propovijed na blagdan B. D. Marije. | |
| registry of completed masses | | 1775–1787 | inv. br. 20 | Bogovići, Krk | Dubašnica, Krk | 62 | 44 x 16 | | Registar izrečenih misa dubašljanskog klera. | |
| | | 1775 (before) | IV a 108 (Kuk. XIXb 471) | Arhiv HAZU | | 11 | 19 x 12 cm | | Oficij od sedam žalosti i pjesma o tri kralja. Scribe Franciscan, likely Pavao Livić. Includes note of ownership by Andrija Grubelić of Prvić (by Šibenik) on 20 May 1775 who still owned it 15 May 1786. Later brought to Franciscan monastery in Krk. Acquired by Kukuljević in the monastir fratarah male bratje u gradu Krku. | |
| ledger | | 1775–1811 | 8 | Dobrinj (župni ured) | Dobrinj | 292 | 31 x 21.5 cm | | Glagolitic to 1806 then Latinic. | |
| deed | | 1775 (March 17) | | Vrgada? | Vrgada | 2 | | | Kupoprodajni ugovor Anice Vukojeve. Scribe: don Pere Radović. Lost as of 2015. | |
| | | 1775 (after) | inv. br. 14 | Poljica (župni ured) | Poljica | 20 | 25.5 x 9 cm | | Evidencija vječnih obaveza poljičkog klera. Written not long after 1775. | |
| christenings | | 1776–1826 | br. 1210 | DaZd | Sukošan | 190 p | 29.1 x 10.3 cm | | Glagolitic to 1783 then Latinic then Italian, with some Latinic from 1777. Includes Latinic christenings 1786–1825. This codex, along with 7 others from Sukošan, includes an Italian index of names added in 1908 by Giovanni Battista de Krekich-Strassoldo (who could evidently read Glagolitic and Cyrillic cursive), the viši savjetnik Namjetništva u Trstu, whose ancestors were in part from Sukošan. | DaZd |
| matricula | | 1776–1825 | | Arhiv Zadarske nadbiskupije | Ljubač | 196 p | 31 x 22.2 cm | 1 co | Madrikula skule sv. Josipa u Ljupču. Glagolitic in 1776, Latinic in 1805 and elsewhere. Bibliography: | GUZ, PB |
| song | | 1776 | VII 60 | Arhiv HAZU | Baška | 16 | 14 x 10 cm | | "Versi duhovne meju ohtabu sv. Tela". Scribe: Petar Hrabrić of Baška. Attached to cover of 1709 book "Nac̨in za dobro umriti posctovanoga Otcza Ivana Iesu Maria". Acquired by Milčetić and loaned to Vinko Premuda. Entered JAZU with Premuda library in 1948. | |
| | | 1776–1800 | | Omišalj (župni ured) | Omišalj | 172 | 34 x 23 cm | | Četvrta kapitulska knjiga Omišlja. Glagolitic and Italian. Paper. | |
| matricula | | 1777–1896 | | Arhiv Zadarske nadbiskupije | Sestrunj | 204 p | 44 x 15.8 cm | 1 co | Glagoljska Madrikula Gospe od Prikazanja (Zdravlja). Glagolitic to 1819 then Latinic. | GUZ, PB |
| | | 1777–1812 | | Omišalj (župni ured) | Omišalj | 74 | 27.5 x 19.5 cm | | Druga knjiga prokuratora klera Omišlja. Glagolitic to 1794 then Latinic and Italian. | |
| ledger | | 1777–1834 | inv. br. 17 | Baška (župni ured) | Baška | 195 | 32.5 x 22.5 cm | | Knjiga računa kapitulskog dižmara i evidencija travarine. Completely Glagolitic. | |
| | | 1777, 1780 | Garanjin-Fanfonja fond, Glagolitika | Državni arhiv u Splitu | Bibinje | 8 | 27 x 9.4 cm | | Liveli za vartli u Bibinju Svete Marije. Scribes: Dominik Bersić (at least in 1777). | |
| constitution | CnIad | 1777 (November 1) | F. 67, No. 10 | Russian National Library | Zadar | | | | Ustav zadarskoga sjemeništa (Statut Bogoslovije u Zadru). | NLR |
| protocol | | 1777–1784 | Glagolitica 4.5, 5.6 | Croatian State Archives | Krk (town) | 269 | | | Protokol notara Ivana Baffo iz Omišlja. | IzSt (2008) |
| | | 1777 | Fragm. glag. 127 | Arhiv HAZU | North Dalmatia | 2 | 15 x 11 cm | | Nagovor mladencima. Acquired by JAZU in 1959 with Gršković library. | |
| blessings and curses | | ~1777 | R 4545 | NSK | Croatia | 50 | 14.1 x 10.3 cm | 1 co | Blagoslovi i zakletve. | NSK |
| ledger | | 1778–1845, 1861–1865 | | Arhiv Zadarske nadbiskupije | Preko | 48 p | 31.7 x 21.4 cm | 1 co | Kvateran Bratovštine Gospe od Luzarija. Glagolitic to 1821 then Latinic. | GUZ, PB |
| | | 1778–1827 | IV a 80/10 | Arhiv HAZU | Sali | 34 | 20 x 14.5 cm | | Bilježnica Mate Šimoncina Puhova. Glagolitic with some Latinic but Glagolitic to the end. Scribes: Mate Šimoncin and Mate Puhov, though the two could be the same person. A rare example of a manuscript written by a literate villager along with IV a 80/41 and IV a 80/17. Acquired by Ivan Berčić. | |
| | | 1778–1793 | inv. br. 9 | Baška (župni ured) | Baška | 198 | 28 x 21 cm | | Kopijalna knjiga dokumenata bašćanskog kapitula. Italian with Glagolitic additions mainly in the margins. | |
| matricula | | 1778–1857 | | Arhiv Zadarske nadbiskupije | Ugljan (town) | 209 p | 29 x 9.5 cm | 1 co | 14 pages Glagolitic, rest Latinic. | GUZ, PB |
| inventory | | 1778–1784 | Garanjin-Fanfonja fond, Glagolitika | Državni arhiv u Splitu | Brbinj | 6 | 28.7 x 20.7 cm | | Note od vina u Brbinju, Božavi, Ižu, Lukoranu, Kukljici 1778–1784. | |
| marriages | | 1779–1882 | | Arhiv Zadarske nadbiskupije | Rava | 94 p | 30 x 11 cm | 1 co | Glagolitic to 1812 then Latinic. | 1779–1828: GUZ, PB |
| matricula | | 1779–1858 | | | Tkon | 35 p | 32 x 22.5 cm | | Madrikula Bratovštine sv. Ante. Catalogued in the Tkon parish archive as br. 3, but lost as of 2015. | |
| will | | 1779 | | | Zaglav | | | | Oporuka Mihe Bažoke od Korlata. Written in Zaglav where he died. | |
| rule | | 1700s (middle) | III a 22 (Kuk. 350) | Arhiv HAZU | | 28 | 20 x 14.5 cm | | Konstitucije Franjevaca III reda. Scribe: Aguštin Keršić. Translated from the Roman printed edition of 1734 by fra Ivan Krizostom Keršić Cresanin made in December 1734. This is a copy of that by Aguštin Keršić made much later. Given by Roman Gršković of Porta to Kukuljević. | |
| | | 1700s (middle) | inv. br. 18 | Poljica (župni ured) | Poljica | 20 | 26 x 9.7 cm | | Evidencija vječnih obaveza poljičkog klera. Dated to middle 18th century despite "1682" on f. 4 on palaeographic grounds and evidence of "1734" and "1748" on f. 8. Earlier date taken as transcribed. | |
| calendar | | 1700s (middle) | br. 4 | Krk (arhiv samostana trećoredaca) | Krk | 38 | 13.7 x 7.5 cm | | Liturgijski kalendar-direktorij. Same hand as br. 5 of same archive. | |
| constitution | | 1700s (middle) | br. 55 | Krk (arhiv samostana trećoredaca) | Krk | 26 | 20 x 14.7 cm | | Konstitucije Franjevaca III reda od 1734. Scribe likely fra Aguštin Keršić Cresanin, who also wrote Arhiv HAZU sign. III a 22. | |
| homiliary | | 1700s (middle) | IV a 104 | Arhiv HAZU | Kukljica? | 198 | 20 x 14 cm | | Zbornik propovijedi. Probably written on the mainland between Zadar and Šibenik, because the dialect is mixed Shtokavian-Chakavian. Written by multiple hands. Includes 55 homilies. It mentions a don Stipan Kurić, a surname found in Kukljica. | |
| godovi mrtvih | | 1780–1873 | | DaZd | Kali | | 42.3 x 14.8 cm | | Godovi Mrtvih od Kali 1680–1873. Completely Glagolitic down to 1873. The last Glagolitic writing in a parish register in the Zadar diocese. The earlier portions were transcriptions in 1780 by don Šime Mašina (exactly 100 years back). | GUZ, PB |
| deed | | 1780 (December 21) | | | Sali | 1 | | | Kada ja Miha Matu prodajen Miki Armaninu maslin. Scribe: don Ante Ušalj. Discovered in Sali in 2007, facsimile published 2015. | |
| | | 1780 | | Kraj (Samostan sv. Duje) | Pašman | 124 p | 19.5 x 14 cm | | Libar od nauka mladoga misnika. Glagolitic with some Latinic and Italian towards the end. In 1934, a certain Belini of Pašman gave it to the monastery with the note that it came to Belini from their house and ultimately from a certain don N. M. | |
| christenings, deaths | | 1781–1815 | IX 9 | Arhiv HAZU | Miholjice (Sveti Vid) | 76 | 30.7 x 22.2 cm | | Christenings 1781–1815 and deaths 1781–1815. Mostly Glagolitic, with last Glagolitic entry 2 October 1815. | FS |
| protocol | | 1781–1806 | Glagolitica 10.19 | Croatian State Archives | Krk (town) | 133 | | | Protokol notara Fiosfata Staniceo (1781), Biasio Antonio Franco (1781–1794), Antonio Girolamo Calergi (1794), Marco Franco (1794–1798), Pietro Moretti (1798), Mattio Giuriceo (1799–1801), Marco Franco (1801), Antonio Purga (1802–1804), Marco Franco (1805–1806). | IzSt (2008) |
| ledger | | 1781–1806 | inv. br. 1 | Draga Bašćanska (župni ured) | Draga Bašćanska | 408 | 29 x 10 cm | | Računi bratovštine duša od čistilišta. Glagolitic with sporadic Latinic and Italian. | |
| protocol | | 1781–1814 | Glagolitica 9.18 | Croatian State Archives | Dubašnica | 207 | | | Notarski protokol notara Pavla Sormilića iz Dubašnice. Part Glagolitic part Latinic, part Italian. Part 1 (1796–1804) has 44 folia, part 2 (1781–1814) has 152 folia. | IzSt (2008) |
| deed | | 1781 (May 1) | | | Sali | 1 | | | Kada ja Frane Dvornića prodajen Miki Armaninu stup maslin. Scribe: don Ante Ušalj. Discovered in Sali in 2007, facsimile published 2015. | |
| | | 1781 | inv. br. 9 | Poljica (župni ured) | Poljica | 50 | 29.5 x 10.3 cm | | Polica vječnih obaveza poljičkog klera. | |
| intended masses served | | 1782–1798 | | Monastery of Saint Mary Magdalene in Porat, Krk | Dubašnica, Krk | 6 | 28.8 x 10 cm | | Knjiga odsluženih misa za obitelj Cekuta. For the Cekuta family. | |
| masses served | | 1782 (or 1732) | R 3357 (old SM 32 F 8) | Sveučilišna knjižnica u Zagrebu | Baška | 47 | | | Registar odsluženih misa ("Miše kantane i male"). | |
| christenings, marriages, confirmations | | 1782–1815, 1782–1815, 1790–1823 | IX 18 | Arhiv HAZU | Dubašnica, Krk | 132 | 31 x 22 cm | | Christenings (1782–1815), marriages (1782–1815), confirmations (1790–1823). Mostly Glagolitic. | |
| book for Our Lady of Mount Carmel | | 1782–1860 | inv. br. 6 | Bogovići, Krk | Dubašnica, Krk | 178 | 30.5 x 22.5 cm | | Knjiga Majke Božje Karmenske. She was the patron of the Bogović family. Glagolitic as late as 25 February 1808 by Pavao Sormilić then Latinic from 1814. | |
| | | 1782 | IV a 80/31 | Arhiv HAZU | | 4 | 20 x 14 cm | | Oficij "Od spasitelja". Written by a scribe in a Franciscan monastery. | |
| homiliary | | 1783–1830 | | Galevac (Samostan sv. Pavla) | Galevac? | 397 p | 22.2 x 15.3 cm | | Propovijedi 1783–1830. Includes 36 homilies: 32 in Latinic, 3 in Italian, 1 in Glagolitic (ff. 117–120). There is also Glagolitic on other pages. | |
| ledger | | 1783–1822 | | Galevac (Samostan sv. Pavla) | Galevac | 287 p | 31.7 x 23 cm | | Blagajnički dnevnik 1783–1822. | |
| | | 1783–1849 | br. 93 | Krk (arhiv samostana trećoredaca) | Krk | 94 | 28 x 10 cm | | Knjiga prihoda ljetine. Glagolitic to 1849 with some Latinic at end. | |
| | | 1783–1815 | br. 95 | Krk (arhiv samostana trećoredaca) | Krk | 129 | 39 x 14 cm | | Knjiga evidencije zakupa i zajmova. Completely Glagolitic. | |
| deed | | 1783 (February 21) | | | Sali | 1 | | | Matij Pazina sa ženom i svastjom Justinom prodaju šior Nikoletu Armaninu jedan stup maslina na Krševanu polju. Scribe: parish priest don Petar Vodopija. Discovered in Sali in 2007, facsimile published 2015. | |
| deed | | 1783 (March 1) | | | Sali | 1 | | | Kada ja Mate Mihič s mojimi sini prodajen šior Miki Armaninu maslin. Scribe: don Ante Ušalj. Discovered in Sali in 2007, facsimile published 2015. | |
| deed | | 1783 (March 5) | | | Sali | 1 | | | Kada ja don Petar i Miha Matu prodajemu šior Miki Armaninu maslin. Scribe: don Ante Ušalj. Discovered in Sali in 2007, facsimile published 2015. | |
| deed | | 1783 (March 16) | | | Sali | 1 | | | Kada ja Luca Smolapova nahodeći sa u velikoje mizeriji, zapušćena od mojih sinov Gašpara i Luke, da mene netje da hrane u moje starosti, a sada prodajen za hraniti se jedan stup maslin šior Mihi Armaninu u Grušina. Scribe: don Ante Ušalj. Discovered in Sali in 2007, facsimile published 2015. | |
| deaths | | 1784–1839 | | Arhiv Zadarske nadbiskupije | Pakoštane | 132 p | 39 x 15 cm | 1 co | Glagolitic to 1807 then Latinic. | GUZ, PB |
| | | 1784–1826 | Libro VI | Dobrinj (župni ured) | Dobrinj | 266 | 31 x 22 cm | | Kapitulska knjiga: isprave. Glagolitic to 1807 then Italian. Final Glagolitic note by notary Ivan Kirinčić. | |
| ledger | | 1784–1795 | | Arhiv Zadarske nadbiskupije | Radošinovci | 128 p | 29 x 11 cm | 1 co | Kvateran Župe svetog Ante. Completely Glagolitic. | GUZ, PB |
| annerversaries | | 1784 | | Biograd (Zavičajni muzej) | Poljica | 186 p | 22 x 15 cm | | Glagolitic and Latinic, with a Cyrillic note by don Dujo Radović of Vir. | |
| annerversaries | | 1785 (March) – 1846 | | Samostan sv. Mihovila na Zaglavu | Zadar, Zaglav | 95 p | 23.8 x 15.8 cm | | Knjiga godova župe Zaglav. Begins March 1785 when a transcription of an older book was made by brother Bonaventura Dragozetić Cresanin living in Zadar at the time. The older book began 1 September 1660. Glagolitic to 1826 then Latinic, with Latinic 1814 for the Zaglav christening register 1814–1840. | |
| masses register | | 1785–1800 | | Arhiv Zadarske nadbiskupije | Sali | 15 p | 32 x 22 cm | | Namirnice za izgovorene mise. | GUZ, PB |
| hymnal | | 1785–1799 | | Vrbnik (knjižnica "Vitezić") | Vrbnik | 19 | 14.5 x 10 cm | | Zbirčica pjesama Franića Juranića. Scribes: Frane Juranić and Jure Vitezić, both of Vrbnik. | |
| intended masses | | 1785 | | Državni arhiv u Zadru | Zadar | 14 | 38 x 13 cm | | Knjiga misnih intencija. Glagolitic and Latinic. Includes description Libro ove si anoteranno le Messe d' obbligo della Scuola di S. Antonio Abate, che si celebreranno dal Rev. Capellano, principia sotto il priorato di me Gio. Grisogono Franceschi. | |
| christenings | | 1786–1839 | | Arhiv Zadarske nadbiskupije | Visočane | 64 p | | 1 co | | GUZ, PB |
| receipts and expenditures | | 1786–1809 | | Arhiv Zadarske nadbiskupije | Sutomišćica | 19 p | 31 x 20.5 cm | | Razni doprinosi, primitci i rashodi. | |
| receipts and expenditures | | 1787–1816 | br. 96 | Krk (arhiv samostana trećoredaca) | Krk | 198 | 32.7 x 21.2 cm | | Blagajnička knjiga primitaka i izdataka. Completely Glagoitic. | |
| ledger | | 1787? | VII 64 | Arhiv HAZU | Baška | 109 | 19.5 x 11 cm | | Dižmarska knjiga bašćanskog kapitula. Scribe possibly Petar Hrabrić. Acquired by JAZU in 1948 with Premuda library. | |
| mass register | | 1788–1808 | | Galevac (Samostan sv. Pavla) | Galevac | 156 p | 29.4 x 10.5 cm | | Completely Glagolitic. | |
| ledger | | 1788–1856, 1863 | inv. br. 18 | Baška (župni ured) | Baška | 276 | 30 x 22 cm | | Knjiga računa kapitulskog dižmara. Glagolitic to 1793 then Latinic and Italian in 1863. | |
| | | 1788–1789 | inv. br. 20 | Poljica (župni ured) | Poljica | 48 | 29 x 10 cm | | Polica vječnih obaveza poljičkog klera. Completely Glagolitic. | |
| deaths | | 1789–1843 | | Arhiv Zadarske nadbiskupije | Dračevac Ninski | 38 p | 30.8 x 11 cm | 1 co | Glagolitic on pages 3 and 4. | GUZ, PB |
| annerversaries | | 1789–1973 | | Arhiv Zadarske nadbiskupije | Nadin | 188 p | 22.2 x 15 cm | 1 co | Knjiga godova. Glagolitic then Latinic in 19th and 20th centuries. Scribe: raštevićki župnik don Martin Beram (Glagolitic part), župnik don Dujo Radović (a Glagolitic note at the end). | GUZ, PB |
| | | 1789–1827 | br. 89 | Krk (arhiv samostana trećoredaca) | Krk | 32 | 31.8 x 21 cm | | Inventari samostana sv. Franje u Krku. Italian then Glagolitic as early as 1745 or before. Glagolitic to 1827. | |
| | | 1789–1855 | br. 26 | Vrbnik (župni ured) | Vrbnik | 5 | 31 x 22 cm | | Imenik bratovštine Gospe od Karmena. Glagolitic to 1808 then Latinic. | |
| decree | | 1789 (April 22) | fond Petricioli, sign. K. V. f. 45, l. 188 | DaZd | Sali | | | | Isprava o zaštiti prava Saljana na ribanje u uvali Statival (Tumačenje mandata providura Anzuo Memo Četvrti). A translation of a decree. Facsimile in Glagoljica u Salima 2015. Within a group of 195 folia of documents related to fishery in Sali, organised by G. Petricioli and his son Ernesto. | |
| notebook | | 1789 | IV a 80/37 | Arhiv HAZU | | 2 | 20 x 14.5 cm | | Kleričke bilješke. | |
| annerversaries | | 1790–1886 | | Pašman (župni ured) | Pašman (town) | | 32.8 x 11.8 cm | | Glagoitic to 1868 then Latinic. Begins with 1790 transcription from earlier material by parish priest Burić. Last cursive Glagolitic written in Zadar bishopric. | |
| annerversaries | | 1790–1862 | | Arhiv Zadarske nadbiskupije | Veli Iž | 104 p | 39.2 x 13.6 cm | | Glagoljski Libar godov. Glagolitic to 1831 then Latinic. Transcribed from older manuscript 1790 by parish priest Ive Košta. | GUZ, PB |
| annerversaries | | 1790- | | Arhiv Zadarske nadbiskupije | Preko | 118 p | 45 x 16 cm | | Godovnik. Transcribed 1790 and continued. Glagolitic to 1854. A few Latinic names with pencil. One of the last Glagolitic manuscripts from Zadar bishopric. | GUZ, PB |
| deaths, burials | | 1790–1838 | br. 122 | Krk (arhiv samostana trećoredaca) | Krk | 19 | 28 x 9.5 cm | | Knjiga ukopanih u crkvi sv. Franje u Krku (1790–1816), Knjiga umrlih redovnika sv. Franje u Krku (1824–1838). 22 December 1790 to 19 May 1838. Completely Glagolitic. | |
| receipts | | 1790–1837 | | Zagreb (Arhiv Provincijalata franjevaca trećoredaca) | Martinšćica (Samostan sv. Jeronima) | | | | Brought to Zagreb just before the Italian occupation during WWI. | |
| | | 1790–1830 | | Zagreb (Arhiv Provincijalata franjevaca trećoredaca) | Zaglav | 60 | 27.4 x 9.9 cm | | Knjiga vječnih misa Samostana sv. Mihovila 1790–1830. Mostly Glagolitic. | |
| homily | | 1790 | R 4368 | NSK | Plomin | 72 | 21.1 x 15 cm | 1 co | O ljubavi prema neprijatelju. One Glagolitic homily but rest are Latinic. | NSK |
| | | 1790 | inv. br. 19 | Baška (župni ured) | Baška | 8 | 28.5 x 10.5 cm | | Iskaz o podjeli desetine janjaca. Glagolitic and Latinic. | |
| | | 1791–1901 | | Glavotok | Glavotok | 87 | 29 x 20.5 cm | | Knjiga novicijata i zavjetovanja. Glagolitic to 1816 then Italian to 1884 then Croatian Latinic. | |
| mass register | | 1791–1820 | | Arhiv Zadarske nadbiskupije | Sutomišćica | 16 p | 31 x 11 cm | | Glagoljske misne tablice. Completely Glagolitic. | |
| | | 1791–1852 | br. 117 | Krk (arhiv samostana trećoredaca) | Krk | 89 | 38 x 14 cm | | Registar vječnih misa. Completely Glagolitic. | |
| hymnal | | 1791 | | Omišalj (župni ured) | Omišalj | 40 | 14 x 10 cm | | "Pisme duhovne". | |
| matricula | | 1791–1816 | | Arhiv Zadarske nadbiskupije | Banj | 216 p | 27 x 18.2 cm | 1 co | Madrikula Sv. Sakramenta u Banju. Completely Glagolitic except for a few rows of Latinic. | GUZ, PB |
| transactions | | 1791–1803, 1834–1875 | | Monastery of Saint Mary Magdalene in Porat, Krk | Dubašnica, Krk | 40 | 28.5 x 9.5 cm | | Blagajnička knjiga (1791–1803) then records of livestock rental for 1834–1875. Glagolitic to 1839 then Italian. | |
| completed masses | | 1791–1801 | sign. F. 119 | Sali (župni ured) | Sali | 15 p | 29.5 x 19.3 cm | | Entries from 14 October 1791 to 1 November 1801. Scribe: parish priest Pero Vodopija. Manuscript once belonged to Petrizioli family. | |
| ledger | | 1792–1802 | | Galevac (Samostan sv. Pavla) | Glavotok, Galevac | 18 p | 39.3 x 28.5 cm | | Blagajnički dnevnik Samostana Sv. Marije na Glavotoku i Samostana sv. Pavla na Školjiću (Galevac). Completely Glagolitic. | |
| ledger | | 1792–1813 | | Galevac (Samostan sv. Pavla) | Glavotok, Galevac, Bijar | 59 p | 39.6 x 28.5 cm | | Blagajnički dnevnik Samostana Sv. Marije na Glavotoku, sv. Pavla na Školjiću (Galevac) i Sv. Marije na Bijaru. Completely Glagolitic. | |
| christenings, confirmations, marriages | | 1793–1812, 1830–1858 | IX 14 | Arhiv HAZU | Dobrinj | 254 | 44.8 x 15.5 cm | | Christenings (1793–1812, 1830–1858), marriages (1793), confirmations (1795–1812, 1831–1850). Glagolitic to 1812 then Latin and Italian. | |
| christenings | | 1793–1863 | br. 1149 | DaZd | Soline (Dugi otok) | 100 p | 39.2 x 13.5 cm | | Glagolitic to 1812 then Latinic. In 1793–1813 it also served for Veli Rat. In 1861–1863 it was Italian. | DaZd, FS |
| receipts and expenditures | | 1793–1846 | | Zavičajni muzej u Biogradu | Tkon | 256 p | 29 x 21 cm | | Knjiga primitaka i izdataka 1793–1846. Glagolitic and Latinic. | |
| | | 1793 | inv. br. 21 | Poljica (župni ured) | Poljica | 101 | 31.5 x 10.9 cm | | Evidencija vječnih obaveza poljičkog klera. Glagolitic except for one Latinic note at end. | |
| deaths, marriages | | 1794–1812, 1824–1850 | IX 15 | Arhiv HAZU | Dobrinj | 296 | 44.5 x 15.5 cm | | Deaths (1794–1812, 1839–1850) and marriages (1794–1812, 1824–1850). Glagolitic to 11 May 1812 then Latin and Italian. | FS |
| annerversaries | | 1794- | | Arhiv Zadarske nadbiskupije | Sestrunj | 118 p | 28.5 x 9.5 cm | | Libar godov. Transcribed 1794 from a book whose first entry was 1624. Glagolitic to 1845 then Latinic. The annerversaries from 20 to 30 April were missing, but parish priest don I. Finka filled them in. | GL, PB |
| ledger | | 1794–1796 | | Galevac (Samostan sv. Pavla) | Zaglav (Samostan sv. Mihovila) | 99? p | 31.2 x 21.7 cm | | Blagajnički dnevnik 1794–1796. | |
| | | 1794–1827 | Libro E | Bogovići (župni ured) | Dubašnica | 8 | 28.5 x 20 cm | | Kapitulska knjiga: kupnje, najmovi i zajmovi. Glagolitic and Italian. Last Glagolitic legal act 28 January 1814 by Pavao Sormilić. | |
| | | 1794 | | Škofijski arhiv in Ljubljana | Dubašnica | 19 | | | Oficij za mrtve fra Petra Turčića. Scribe: fra Petar Turčić Once in library of the hospice in Brezje (pri Radovljici). | |
| deaths | | 1795–1830 | br. 805 | DaZd | Petrčane | 28 p | 38 x 13 cm | | Glagolitic to 1812 then Latinic. | DaZd, FS |
| ledger | | 1795–1802 | | Arhiv Zadarske nadbiskupije | Sutomišćica | 8 p | 30 x 11 cm | | Računi Bratovštine Gospe od Karmena i duša od purgatorija. Glagolitic except for a few Latinic entries on pages 1 and 4 | |
| | | 1795–1852 | br. 27 | Vrbnik (župni ured) | Vrbnik | 42 | 31.8 x 22.5 cm | | Knjiga bratovštine duša "od purgatorija". Parts from 1770 to 1794 copied. Glagolitic and Latinic, with Glagolitic 1796, 1805, 1816, 1821, 1828. | |
| ledger | | 1795–1849 | inv. br. 13 | Baška (župni ured) | Baška | 46 | 31 x 22.5 cm | | Knjiga računa kapitulskih prokuradura 1795–1849. Only part of beginning (f. 2) Glagolitic, in 1795. Latinic 1795 forward. Scribe: Petar Hrabrić. | |
| masses | | 1795- | | Sali (župni ured) | Sali | 56 p | | | Spomen mise. | FS |
| receipts and expenditures? | | 1795 | | Arhiv Zadarske nadbiskupije | Murvica | 4 p | 28.4 x 10 cm | | Dvolist iz Murvice. Completely Glagolitic. | |
| | | 1795 (February 9, 25, March 5, 15) | fond Petricioli, sign. K. V. f. 47, l. 1 | DaZd | Sali | | | | Upozorenje prokaratura crkve sv. Marije upućeno prcinigulima i ribarima da su zanemarili davati svoje obveze. | |
| will | | 1795 (August 13) | R 6757 | NSK | Dobrinj | 2 | 28.2 x 19.5 cm | 1 co | Oporuka Mikule Črnčića kod Dobrinja. Scribe: notary Ivan Kirinčić | NSK |
| | | 1795 | inv. br. 20 | Baška (župni ured) | Baška | 4 | 28.5 x 10.5 cm | | Iskaz o primanju desetine žitarica. Completely Glagolitic. | |
| receipts and expenditures | | 1795–1797 | | Arhiv Zadarske nadbiskupije | Sutomišćica | 58 p | 20.5 x 15.5 cm | | Madrikula Bratovštine Svetoga Tila (prihodi i rashodi). | |
| loans | | 1795–1798 | | Monastery of Saint Mary Magdalene in Porat, Krk | Dubašnica, Krk | 102 | 31.5 x 11 cm | | Knjiga zajmova fra Antona Sabljića. Scribe: friar Anton Sabljić. | |
| registers | | 1796–1830 | Glagolitica 16 | Croatian State Archives | Dubašnica, Krk (town) | | | | Kutija 4: Notarski zapisi Dubašnice i Krka. Includes Glagolitic and Latinic. Contains (1) Notarski zapisi na talijanskom jeziku (1796–1823), (2) Notarska knjiga notara Jure Milčetića, pisana hrvatski latinicom (3 February 1804 – 15 February 1808) with f. 48, (3) Notarski spisi na talijanskom s izvornim popisom (1775–1830). | |
| | | 1796 | inv. br. 2 | Poljica (župni ured) | Poljica | 22 | 29.5 x 10.3 cm | | Polica vječnih obaveza poljičkog klera. | |
| marriages | | 1797–1825 | br. 803 | DaZd | Petrčane | 20 p | 38 x 12 cm | | Glagolitic to 1811 then Latinic. Scribes: parish priests of Petrčane. | DaZd, FS |
| | | 1797–1831 | HR–DAZD–359 (Obitelj Lantana collection) kut. 11 sign. 173 | DaZd | | 91 | | | Razna imovinsko-pravna dokumentacija. Latinic with some Glagolitic folia (ff. 85–90). Part of Lantana family archive. Acquired by Državni arhiv u Zadru 1945. | |
| will | | 1797 (October 30) | fond Oporuke iz kancelarije zadarskih knezova | DaZd | Sali | | | | Oporuka Jure Rakara. | |
| legal | | 1797 | | Kukljica (Ljubo Martinović Lonićev library) | | | | | Scribe: don Lovre Peštić of Lukoran, parish priest of Kukljica. | |
| | | 1797 | inv. br. 19 | Poljica (župni ured) | Poljica | 22 | 28 x 9.7 cm | | Polica vječnih obaveza poljičkog klera. Completely Glagolitic. | |
| abecedary | | 1797 | Cod. Kop. 13 | Ljubljana (Narodna in univerzitetska knjižnica) | Ljubljana | 48 | 21.8 x 17.5 cm | | Zvezek Valentina Vodnika za slovansko paleografijo. Latin with Glagolitic abecedary. | DKS (28 September 2015) |
| | | 1797, 1799 | Arhiv obitelji Garanjin-Fanfonja, glagolitika | Državni arhiv u Splitu | Veli Iž | 64 | 14.4 x 10.5 cm | | Štima od maslina u Ižu i Žvirincu. | |
| christenings | | 1798–1864 | inv. br. 26 | DaZd | Banj | 220 p | 28 x 9.7 cm | 1 co | Glagolitic to 1815 inclusive then Latinic. | DaZd, FS |
| | | 1798 – after 1828 | Ante Strgačić collection | DaZd | Sali | 68 p | 19.6 x 14.3 cm | | Libar skule Milosrđa. School began 1693, book survived in transcription from 1798 by don Šime Rakar of Sali, final entry after 1828. Found in house of Ivan Bibica Zelenko in 1924. | |
| | | 1798 | Garanjin-Fanfonja fond, Glagolitika | Državni arhiv u Splitu | Bibinje, Sukošan | 4 | | | Štima od maslin crkve Sv. Marije i sv. Nikole u Bibinjama i Sukošanu. | |
| deaths | | 1799–1863 | inv. br. 32 | DaZd | Banj | 304 p | 28 x 9.5 cm | | Glagolitic to 1812 then after gap from 1816 is Latinic. | DaZd, FS |
| marriages | | 1799–1864 | inv. br. 28 | DaZd | Banj | 222 p | 27.8 x 9.6 cm | | Glagolitic to 1810 inclusive then after gap from 1816 is Latinic. Banj and Ždrelac shared parish registers. | DaZd, FS |
| matricula | | 1799–1858 | arhiv br. 3 | Tkon (župni ured) | Tkon | 35 p | 32 x 22.5 cm | 1 co | | |
| registry of completed masses | | 1799–1817 | inv. br. 18 | Bogovići, Krk | Dubašnica, Krk | 109 | 45 x 16 cm | | Registar izrečenih misa dubašljanskog klera. | |
| intended masses | | 1799–1806 | | Monastery of Saint Mary Magdalene in Porat, Krk | Dubašnica, Krk | 14 | 31.5 x 10.8 cm | | Odlomak knjige misnih intencija. A part of the book. | |
| ledger | | 1799–1826 | | Arhiv Zadarske nadbiskupije | Sestrunj | 154 p | 43.2 x 15.6 cm | | Blagajnički dnevnik župne crkve svetog Petra. Glagolitic to 1819 then Latinic. | GUZ, PB |
| | | 1799, 1801 | Arhiv obitelji Garanjin-Fanfonja, glagolitika | Državni arhiv u Splitu | Zverinac | 8 | 19.2 x 14 cm | | Nota od mis i štima od maslin za Zverinac. Begins October 1799. | |
| | | 1799–1857 | br. 25 | Vrbnik (župni ured) | Vrbnik | 18 | 31 x 22 cm | | Imenik bratovštine presv. Ruzarija. Glagolitic to 1791 then Latinic then Glagolitic 1792–1797 then Latinic 1798 then Glagolitic 1799 and 1805 then Latinic 1806–1807 then Glagolitic 1808 then Latinic. | |
| prayer | | 1700s | | Zagreb (Arhiv Provincijalata franjevaca trećoredaca u Zagrebu) | Zaglav (Samostan sv. Mihovila) | 8 | 14.7 x 10.4 cm | | Večernja molitva. Scribe: fra Mate Šešela of Zaglav. | |
| | | 1799 | Arhiv obitelji Garanjin-Fanfonja, Glagolitika | Državni arhiv u Splitu | Rava | 6 | 19 x 13.5 cm | | Nota od mis koje je govorio pop Ivan Bobić u Ravi. | |
| | | 1700s | IV a 80/54 | Arhiv HAZU | Ražanac | 1 | 22.8 x 15 cm | | List raznih zapisa. Glagolitic and Latinic. Belonged to Jure Miletić of Ražanac in 1769. Later to Mate Gačić of Tribanj. | |
| miscellany | | 1700s | IX H 6 | Prague (National Museum) | Croatia | | | | Nikodemovo evangelium hlaholským písmem. Includes a Gospel of Nicodemus in verse. | |
| prayer book | | 1700s | IV a 126 | Arhiv HAZU | North Dalmatia | 10 | 14 x 9.5 cm | | Fragmenat molitvenika. Written by 2 alternating hands. | |
| ritual | | 1700s | R 4566 | NSK | Croatia | 16 | 20.6 x 14.5 cm | | Obrednik ređenja novaka. | NSK |
| handbook | | 1600s/1700s | R 3373 (St. sign. SM.32.F.25) | NSK | Croatia | 14 | 14.3 x 9.5 cm | 1 co | Govorenja o sakramentima. | NSK |
| officium defunctorum | | 1700s | R 6742 | NSK | Croatia | 16 | 16.8 x 11.8 cm | 2 co | Čin umrvšim'. | NSK |
| | | 1700s | | Arhiv Zadarske nadbiskupije | Sutomišćica | 14 p | 29 x 11 cm | | Popis dužnika. | |
| | | 1700s | | Galevac (Samostan sv. Pavla) | Galevac | 30 p | 28.7 x 20.5 cm | | Libar od razlikih pisam i kartulinov od intrade mostira sv. Pavla. Completely Glagolitic excepting two Italian notes. This book was used in the administration of the monastery property on Puntamika in Zadar. | |
| | | 1700s? | IV c 9176 | Gorizia (Biblioteca del Seminario Teologico) | | | | | Teološki priručnik. A photocopy F 221 made 1985 exists at the Staroslavenski institut. | |
| prayer book | | 1700s | R 4230 | NSK | Baška | 18 | 15 x 11 cm | 1 co | Molitveni priručnik. Glagolitic and Latinic. | NSK |
| Dottrina Cristiana by Lorenzo Priuli | DcChrist | 1700s | R 3369 | NSK | Krk | 71 | 15 x 11 cm | 1 co | Dotrina karšćanska. By scribe Miko Dorčić. | NSK |
| legal | | 1700s | Glagolitica II-1 | HDA | Krk | | | | Knez Ivan VIII. Frankapan daje u patronat svom upravitelju i činovniku (faturu) Marinu Gujašiću crkvu Sv. Ivana na Sužanu kod Omišlja. Original dated 15 August 1464. Survives only in Glagolitic transcription together with transcriptions of documents from 10 November 1465 (Demarcation by Ivan Frankopan of Vlach lands of Kras) and August 1468 (Knez Ivan Frankapan zabranjuje vlahom oko Omišlja). This was a translation from the Italian translation of P. Petriš. | IzSt (2008) |
| legal | | 1700s (February 16) | R 3358 | NSK | | 16 | | | Nagodba o isplati duga pred sucem Jurom Žuvićem od Omiša. Scribe: pop Ivan Pindulić. Includes 5 documents written in Glagolitic and Cyrillic, with transcriptions | GHR, NSK |
| | | 1700s | Kuzma Vučetić collection (HR–DAZD–376), kut. 12, sign. 3.5.6 | DaZd | | 6 | | | Dekret na hrvatskom jeziku glagoljicom. | |
| prayer | | 1700s | R 4376 | NSK | Croatia | 4 | 14.5 x 9.5 cm | 1 co | Molitva koja se kanta nad mrtvacem. | NSK, GHR |
| office for iii | OfIII | 1700s | R 4375 | NSK | | 16 | 18.5 x 12.5 cm | 1 co | Oficij za mjesec ožujak. | NSK |
| prayer book | | 1700s | R 3367 (St. sign. SM.32.F.19) | NSK | Croatia | 15 | 15.2 x 11 cm | 1 co | Zbirčica molitava (Kratki razlogi). From Poljica or Ponikve or Punat. Acquired by Fran Kurelac. | NSK |
| | | 1700s | R 4377 | NSK | | 28+11 | | | Žunta za govoriti oficii i misse. 7 documents. | |
| register | | 1700s | Glagolitica I-16 | Croatian State Archives | Vrbnik | 1 | 20.1 x 14 cm | | List of Money Given to Vrbnik Priests (Popis novca dano vrbničkim popovima). Donated to HDA by Branko Kursar in 1962. | IzSt (2008) |
| dialogue | | 1700s | R 4348 | NSK | Croatia | 42 | 19.5 x 14.5 cm | | Razgovaranje od kriposti bogoslovnih. | NSK, GHR |
| | | 1700s | inv. br. 11 | Poljica (župni ured) | Poljica | 24 | 29.5 x 10.3 cm | | Evidencija misnih obaveza poljičkog klera. For April. | |
| | | 1700s | inv. br. 7 | Poljica (župni ured) | Poljica | 24 | 29.5 x 10.3 cm | | Evidencija misnih obaveza poljičkog klera. For August. | |
| | | 1700s | inv. br. 21 | Baška (župni ured) | Baška | 29 | 28.7 x 10 cm | | Evidencija dužnika bašćanskoga klera. Completely Glagolitic. | |
| homiliary | | 1700s | | Olib (Ivan Pulišić library) | Sutomišćica | 28 p | 20.5 x 15.1 cm | | Govorenja duhovna. Scribe: Ivan Vlahić, born around 1733 in Sutomišćica on Ugljan, parish priest 1765–1803 in Sutomišćica, died 25 July 1803. | |
| homiliary | | 1700s | | Kraj (Samostan sv. Duje) | Pašman | 24 p | 18 x 13 cm | | Nekoliko propovijedi. Glagolitic except for Latinic on pages 26–27. Scribe: don Grgo Burić of Pašman. | |
| homily | | 1700s | | Arhiv Zadarske nadbiskupije | Sali | 296 p | 22 x 17.7 cm | | Govorenje od posluha. Once belonged to Šimun Grando according to a note from 1822 or possibly 1892. The beginning was transcribed by don Leonard Rinko Finka in 1954 (pages 79–93). Catalogued in the župni ured of Sali as R 3. | GL, PB |
| Dormition and Ascension of the Blessed Virgin Mary | | 1700s | | Ante Strgačić library | Dugi otok | 23 p | 23.5 x 17.5 cm | | Dormitio et ascensio B. M. Virginis. Written in Zadar island dialect. Glagolitic but with influence from Italian orthography. Found in Luka on Dugi otok in house of Ivan Bubica Zelenko in 1924. Acquired by Ante Strgačić. | |
| homily | | 1700s | | Ante Strgačić library | Dugi otok | 8 p | 20.6 x 14.8 cm | | Govo o kleveti i laži. Written in Zadar island dialect. Found in Luka on Dugi otok in house of Ivan Bubica Zelenko in 1924. Acquired by Ante Strgačić. | |
| homily | | 1700s | | Ante Strgačić library | Dugi otok | 8 p | 20.6 x 14.2 cm | | Oproštajna propovijed nekoga glagoljaša. Written in same hand and dialect as the Dormitio et ascensio. Found in Luka on Dugi otok in house of Ivan Bubica Zelenko in 1924. Acquired by Ante Strgačić. | |
| | | 1700s | br. 15 | Vrbnik (župni ured) | Vrbnik | 7+24 | 28 x 19 cm, 28.5 x 19.5 cm | | Spisi vrbničkog klera. A fascicle with two bindings. The first includes copies from earlier but begins 14 July 1721. The second is Italian and Latinic from 1809 because Vrbnik priests had switched to writing their native language mainly in Latinic by then. | |
| prayer book | | 1700s | VII 162 | Arhiv HAZU | Baška? | 18 | 16 x 11 cm | | Molitvenik. Cakavisms may point to an origin in Baška, as with Tomašićev molitvenik (sign. VII 161). Acquired by JAZU in 1959 through Gršković collection. | |
| miscellany | CDor | 1700s | VII 113 | Arhiv HAZU | Baška | 58 | 13.3 x 5.5 cm | | Priručnik Mika Dorčića. Scribe: Miko Dorčić of Baška. A younger hand wrote in the empty pages in the first half of the 19th century. Miko Dorčić also wrote the 1734 Kršćanski nauk (sign. R 3369). He died in Baška 1772. Manuscript discovered 1928 in a villager's house in Draga Bašćanska by Štefanić, who donated it to Arhiv JAZU 1958. | |
| homiliary | | 1700s | IV a 132 | Arhiv HAZU | | 34 | 20 x 14.2 cm | | Zbirka propovijedi Nikole Belića. Scribe: Nikola Belić. Not to be confused with the larger homiliary of Nikola Belić or the smaller Korizmene propovijedi or the Deset propovijedi or any of the 2 or more others by the same. | |
| homiliary | | 1700s | IV a 132 (IV a 154) | Arhiv HAZU | | 13 | 20 x 14 cm | | Korizmene propovijedi Nikole Belića. Scribe: Nikola Belić. | |
| homiliary | | 1700s | IV a 127 | Arhiv HAZU | | 24 | 20 x 14.2 cm | | Deset propovijedi Nikole Belića. Scribe: Nikola Belić. | |
| homiliary | | 1700s | IV a 137 | Arhiv HAZU | | 16 | 20.3 x 14.3 cm | | Zbirčica propovijedi (Nikole Belića?). Scribe: probably Nikola Belić. | |
| homiliary | | 1700s | IV a 80/22 | Arhiv HAZU | | 3 | 20 x 14 cm | | Odlomci korizmene propovijedi (Nikole Belića?). Scribe probably Nikola Belić. Possibly once part of IV a 137. | |
| homiliary | | 1700s | IV a 80/2 | Arhiv HAZU | | 12 | 19.5 x 14 cm | | Komad zbirke propovijedi. Acquired by a collector in Sukošan on 2 September 1857. | |
| homily | | 1700s | IV a 80/42 | Arhiv HAZU | | 4 | 20 x 14.2 cm | | Propovijed o molitvi. Hand identical to IV a 80/2. | |
| homily | | 1700s | IV a 80/5 | Arhiv HAZU | North Dalmatia | 1 | 20 x 14.2 cm | | Odlomak propovijedi na čistu srijedu. Scribe: don Ive Vlahić parish priest of Sutomišćica. | |
| homily | | 1700s | IV a 80/28 | Arhiv HAZU | North Dalmatia | 6 | 19.8 x 14 cm | | Propovijed o grijehu i kazni. | |
| | | 1700s | Arhiv obitelji Garanjin-Fanfonja, Glagolitika | Državni arhiv u Splitu | Ugljan | 22 p | 14 x 10.8 cm | | Iz Katekizma Mihe Vukojevića rečenog Milina iz Ugljana. Scribe: Mihe Milin of Ugljan. | |
| | | 1700s | III a 7 | Arhiv HAZU | | 73 | 14.5 x 10 cm | | Dio teološkog priručnika (skripta). Hand similar to that of Barić Mandić (sign. I a 34), probably also by him. | |
| masses served | | 1700s | IV a 80/52 | Arhiv HAZU | Veli Iž | 1 | 16 x 14 cm | | Polica izrečenih misa. | |
| prayer book | | 1700s | IV a 79 | Arhiv HAZU | | 37 | 18.2 x 14 cm | | Molitveni zbornik (šekvencije). Main hand is of don Anton Vodopija (parish priest in Sali in 1710). Two other hands wrote in it not long after 1724. Later it was owned by student Vid Grbin of Sali (later parish register scribe in Žman 1769–1770) who wrote on f. 37v. Given to possibly Berčić by a certain Petešić in 1866. Entered Arhiv JAZU in 1894 with Berčić archive. | |
| | | 1700s | I a 99 | Arhiv HAZU | | 29 | 14 x 10 cm | | Dio teološkog priručnika (O ženidbi i drugo). Scribe same as sign. III a 7 and I a 34, so Barić Mandić of Baška. | |
| | | 1700s | VII 52 | Arhiv HAZU | Baška | 9 | 14.3 x 10 cm | | Kratki kazuistički pregled. Written in Baška dialect. Acquired by JAZU with Vinko Premuda library in 1948. | |
| | | 1700s | IV a 130 | Arhiv HAZU | Iž (island) | 16 | 21 x 15 cm | | Priručnik za ispovjednika. The parish priests' surnames help localise it. Acquired 1854 from Veli Iž. | |
| | | 1700s | IV a 80/24 | Arhiv HAZU | North Dalmatia | 1 | 27.3 x 19.2 cm | | | |
| | | 1700s | IV b 14 (Kuk. 1023) | Arhiv HAZU | | 4 (I), 2 (II), 10 (III) | 22 x 15 cm, 21 x 14.5 cm, 21 x 16.7 cm | | Miscellanea. Document I written by same hand as IV a 108 (from 1775), containing Krnja legenda o sv. Roku. Document II is a bifolium for the Great Week. Document III is a Latinic transcription from Glagolitic by Jakov Volčić in Veprinac on 19 September 1854. | |
| | | 1700s | br. 47 | Vrbnik (župni ured) | Vrbnik | 10 | 20.8 x 14.7 cm | | Oficij sedam žalosti Majke Božje. | |
| | | 1700s | | Vrbnik (Ivan Volarić library) | Vrbnik | 38 | 14.3 x 10.3 cm | | Knjižica egzorcizma. Inherited by Ivan Volarić from his grandfather. | |
| | | 1700s | | | Draga Bašćanska | | | | Blagoslovi i zakletve (egzorcizmi). Discovered by Ivan Koštal in (Slovene) Gorica, today lost. | |
| | | 1700s | IV a 80/20 | Arhiv HAZU | North Dalmatia? | 2 | 28 x 20 cm | | Karta sv. Bonifacija. Entered JAZU together with the rest of the manuscripts with sign. IV a 80. | |
| | | 1700s | inv. br. 16 | Bogovići (župni ured) | Dubašnica | 132 | 31.2 x 22.2 cm | | Kapitulska knjiga: isprave. | |
| | | 1700s | | Omišalj (župni ured) | Omišalj | 48 | | | Akti procesa između omišaljske općine i bratovštine sv. Marije velike. Includes transcriptions of older legal acts. Glagolitic and Italian. | |
| homily | | 1700s | IV a 135 | Arhiv HAZU | Zadar area? | 4 | 19.5 x 13.5 cm | | Propovijed za mladu misu. Written in Dalmatia, maybe from the environs of Zadar. | |
| homiliary | | 1700s | Fragm. glag. 116 | Arhiv HAZU | Kvarner | 10 | 20 x 14.5 cm | | Odlomci crkvenih propovijedi. Written on a Kvarner island. | |
| | | 1700s | Fragm. glag. 126 | Arhiv HAZU | | 1 | 21.5 x 15.3 cm | | Najava blagdana i nedjeljna pobožnost. Written in one of the following years: 1750, 1761, 1767, 1778, 1789, 1795. Written shortly before September 20. Acquired by JAZU in 1959 with the Gršković library. | |
| | | 1700s | IV a 80/38 | Arhiv HAZU | | 4 | 20.2 x 14.3 cm | | Djelo vjere, ufanja i skrušenja. Štokavskoikavski dialect. | |
| notebook | | 1700s | IV a 80/44 | Arhiv HAZU | | 1 | 20 x 14.5 cm | | List kleričke bilježnice. | |
| exorcism | | 1700s | IV a 134 | Arhiv HAZU | North Dalmatia | 6 | 20 x 14 cm | | Exorcism against wherewolves (Egzorcizam protiv vukodlaka). Possibly came to JAZU through Berčić remains. Two photographs in Štefanić 1970. Bibliography: | |
| curses | | 1700s | VII 21 | Arhiv HAZU | Baška | 62 | 14.3 x 10.4 cm | | Zaklinjanje protiv nevremena. Scribe: Mate Hrabrić f. 1-43v, a different hand 44-55v and 58-60v and possibly 56v-57. Includes language from Kašićev Ritual Rimski. Mate Hrabrić mentioned in a list 1782. Acquired by Ivan Milčetić, who loaned or gave it to Vinko Premuda. Entered JAZU upon the death of Premuda. | |
| psalter | | 1700s | No IX.F.38 | Prague National Museum | Russia | 236 | | | Glagolitic interlinear variants. | |
| prayer book | | 1700s | | Vrbnik (knjižnica "Vitezić") | Vrbnik | 17 | 15.5 x 11 cm | | Molitveni priručnik. | |
| prayer book | | 1700s | Arhiv obitelji Garanjin-Fanfonja, glagolitika | Državni arhiv u Splitu | Zadar | 10 | 15 x 10 cm | | Knjiga molitava u stihu. | |
| prayer book, hymnal | | 1700s | Arhiv obitelji Garanjin-Fanfonja, glagolitika | Državni arhiv u Splitu | Zadar | 16 | 14.5 x 10 cm | | Knjiga pjesama i molitava. | |
| | | 1700s | Fragm. glag. 117 | Arhiv HAZU | | 1 | 20.4 x 14.5 cm | | Odlomak Pouke o čistoči. Given by Gršković, guardian in Glavotok, to the Kukuljević collection. | |
| missal | MVat₇ | 1700s | Borgiano illirico 7 | Vatican Library | | 484 | | | Vatikanski misal Illirico 7. | |
| breviary | | 1700s | VII 58 | Arhiv HAZU | Baška | 10 | 19 x 13 cm | | Oficij slavnoga okupitelja. Language matches Baška. Text follows that of the Latin language Venetian Breviarium Romanum of 1757, connecting the manuscript with the Franciscan monasteries. Acquired by JAZU in 1948 with the remains of Vinko Premuda of Baška. | |
| ritual | | 1700s | VIII 138/8 | Arhiv HAZU | Baška | 2 | 10 x 6.8 cm | | Odlomak sprovodnog obreda. Acquired by Milčetić in Baška. | |
| mirror | | 1700s | Glagolitica I-19 | Croatian State Archives | Croatia | 15 | 10 x 14.7 cm | | Zrcalo od ispovidi. Donated to HDA by Branko Kursar in 1962. | IzSt (2008) |
| dialogue | | 1700s (second half) | VII 120 | Arhiv HAZU | Krk (island) | 30 | 19.7 x 14 cm | | Razgovaranje o ljudskim djelima. Scribe likely from Vrbnik on dialectological grounds. Acquired by Štefanić on Krk. Štefanić gave it to Arhiv JAZU in 1958. | |
| | | 1700s (second half) | IV a 73 (IV a 86) | Arhiv HAZU | North Dalmatia | 6 | 19.5 x 14.2 cm | | "Pištula gospodina našega Isukrsta". Dated to after 1740–1750 on watermark grounds. Štokavskoikavski used but with čakavisms. Paper. Manuscript history unknown before JAZU. | |
| | | 1700s (second half) | IV a 81 (IV a 122) | Arhiv HAZU | Sali? | 44 | 19.7 x 14.2 cm | | Priručnik moralne teologije. Scribes: hand A f. 1-2v, hand B f. 3-22v and 25–42, hand C on f. 13, f. 22v-24, f. 44v. Hand C is similar to hand B but with major differences, and was identified by Nedo Grbin as the hand of don Šime Rakar of Sali. Language is štokavskoikavski throughout. Written after the end of the reign of pope Benedict XIV in 1758. Certainly written in the territory of the Zadar archbishopric, possibly in Sali. Purchased by Ivan Berčić in 1848 from the Arbanasi parish priest. Acquired by JAZU with Berčić library One photograph in Štefanić 1970. Bibliography: | |
| | | 1700s (second half) | VII 121 | Arhiv HAZU | Vrbnik | 65 | 17 x 14.4 cm | | Dvije moralističke rasprave. Written by 6 alternating hands of the same school: hand A f. 2-9 and f. 14, hand B f. 9v and f. 55, hand C f. 9v-13, f. 15–23, hand D f. 23–35, hand E f. 36v-38v, hand F f. 39–40. All young clerics from Vrbnik. Written not long after the composition of the text during the papacy of Benedikt XIV (1740–1758). In 1757 the book belonged to Ivan Volarić (dižmar of Vrbnik 1765–1766) and the next note is from 1764. Acquired by Štefanić on Krk many years before 1969 and donated by him to JAZU in 1958. | |
| | | 1700s (second half) | IV a 93 | Arhiv HAZU | Brbinj? | 32 | 21.3 x 14.5 cm | | Kršćanski nauk iz moralke. Written by 1797. Acquired by Ante Rančić parish priest of Brbinj in 1793. Anton Petrov of Brbinj was an owner just before Ante Rančić. Acquired by Berčić in Brbinj in 1851. | |
| directory | | 1700s (second half) | | Gradska knjižnica in Zagreb | Dubašnica | 15 | | | Liturgijski direktorij s dodacima oficija. Translated from Latin by Bare Kraljić of Sv. Anton in Dubašnica. Acquired by Josip Brunšmid (died 1929) | |
| legendarium | | 1700s (second half) | R 3375 (St. sign. SM.32.F.27) | NSK | Croatia | 31 | 20.3 x 14.5 cm | 1 co | Zbirčica legenda. By Dume Grego. | NSK |
| | | 1700s (second half) | | | Dubašnica | 137 | | | "Oficiji" (per Strohal). More likely a Direktorj s dodacima (per Štefanić). Acquired by Brunšmid, not found among his remains. Still lost as of 2003. | |
| | | 1700s (second half) | inv. br. 10 | Baška (župni ured) | Baška | 17 | 28 x 18.5 cm | | Azbučni indeks I i IV kapitulske knjige. | |
| | | 1700s (second half) | inv. br. 30 | Baška (župni ured) | | 23 | 18.5 x 13.5 cm | | Skripta iz moralke. | |
| dialogue | | 1700s (second half) | R 4348 | Sveučilišna knjižnica u Zagrebu | | Baška | | | Razgovaranje od kriposti bogoslovnih i drugo. | |
| legal | | 1700s (second half) | | Dobrinj (župni arhiv) | Dobrinj | | | | Pavao Banić i njegov brat Dminić prodaju zemlje i drmune plovanu Mavru od Dobrinja. Original dated 12 March 1379. Kept at Arhiv HAZU. Glagolitic transcription by Antun Cutinis from second half of 18th century discovered in the same book in the župni arhiv in Dobrinj in which the 1100 grant survives, but it seems to be a back-translation from Latin or Italian. Also survives in 18th century Latin transcription by Antun Cutinis, which preserves the Glagolitic year and one I. Acquired by Kukuljević. | |
| | | 1700s (second half) | VIII 182 | Arhiv HAZU | Dubašnica | 6 | 31.7 x 22.3 cm | | Večernje i slavoslovija na najveće blagdane. Written with Karaman orthography on Venetian paper by a Franciscan. Probably in the monastery sv. Marije Magdalene u Dubašnici (Portu) on Krk. Acquired by JAZU in 1948 with Premuda archive. One photograph in Štefanić 1970. | |
| | | 1700s (second half) | IV a 80/39 | Arhiv HAZU | Sali | 11 | 20 x 15 cm | | Miscellanea. Glagolitic and Latinic. Part of the notebook of Mate Puhov who wrote it. | |
| homiliary | | 1700s (second half) | Fragm. glag. 114 | Arhiv HAZU | | 2 | 28.5 x 19.5 cm | | Dvije korizmene propovijedi. Once part of manuscript IV b 96. | |
| homiliary | | 1700s (second half to end) | IV b 96 | Arhiv HAZU | Banj? | 58 | 30.5 x 22 cm | | Zbirka propovijedi. Acquired by JAZU after 1911. | |
| prayer book | | 1700s (end or second half) | I a 1 | Arhiv HAZU | | 49 | 7.4 x 5.5 cm | | Svećenički molitvenik. Written by a single hand. Language more influenced by Russian Church Slavonic than even the 1688 and 1791 printed breviaries. Donated to JAZU by parish priest Granić of Muć. Paper. One photograph in Štefanić 1970. | |
| homily | | 1700s (end) | | Arhiv Zadarske nadbiskupije | Posedarje | 10 p | 21 x 15 cm | | Propovijed. Discovered in the župni ured of Posedarje on 12 May 2009. | |
| ledger | | 1700s (end) | | Arhiv Zadarske nadbiskupije | | | | | Kvateran župe Radošinovci. | |
| ritual | Fg(Ri)Dub | 1700s (late) | n/a | Monastery of Saint Mary Magdalene in Porat, Krk | Dubašnica, Krk | 18 | 19.6 x 14.2 cm | | Dubašljanski odlomak rituala. | |
| breviary | | 1700s (end) | Fragm. glag. 93 | Arhiv HAZU | | 2 | 19.4 x 14.3 cm | 2 co | Dodatak brevijaru. Written by hand with Latinic ductus. Franciscan of III order. Possibly in Zadar considering commemoration of Saint Simeon. | |
| breviary | | 1700s (end) | Fragm. glag. 125 | Arhiv HAZU | | 2 | 23 x 16 cm | 2 co | Dvolist brevijara. Letters imitate those of the Propaganda fide of Rome. Uses Karaman orthography. Acquired by JAZU with the remains of Jerko Gršković of Vrbnik in 1959. | |
| miscellany | | 1700s (end) | IV a 72 (IV a 65) | Arhiv HAZU | North Dalmatia | 42 | 14 x 9.5 cm | | Molitveni zbornik. Written by 3-4 hands. Mostly by that of student Šime Calović of Tkon. One photograph in Štefanić 1970. | |
| homily | | 1700s (end) | IV a 80/3 | Arhiv HAZU | North Dalmatia | 2 | 30.8 x 21.7 cm | | | |
| homily | | 1700s (end) | IV a 80/21 | Arhiv HAZU | | 8 | 20.3 x 14.3 cm | | Propovijed na Uznesenje. Scribe: don Ive Vlahić. | |
| homily | | 1700s (end) | IV a 80/27 | Arhiv HAZU | | 6 | 20 x 14 cm | | Odlomak propovijedi. Scribe was likely a Franciscan of the Zadar area. | |
| masses served | | 1700s (end) | R 3347 (St. sign. SM.32.F.5) | NSK | Omišalj | 49 | 27.2 x 19.3 cm | 2 co | Registar služenih misa omišaljskoga klera. One year span. | NSK, GHR |
| homiliary | | 1700s (end) | | Arhiv Zadarske nadbiskupije | Posedarje | 20 p | 21 x 15 cm | 1 co | | GUZ, PB |
| | | 1700s (end) | inv. br. 17 | Poljica (župni ured) | Poljica | 96 | 25.2 x 9.5 cm | | Evidencija misnih obaveza poljičkog klera. | |
| homiliary | | 1700s-1800s | R 4346 | NSK | Kvarner, Istria | 64 | | | Osam propovijedi iz Kvarnera i Istre na hrvatski i talijanski. | |
| legal | | 1700s (second half) / 1800s (beginning) | | | Jablanac (Karlobag) | | | | Priest Luka Mikulanić of Jablanac swears before witnesses to repay his debt of 150 libra Original dated 11 April 1485 lost. Survives only in this Glagolitic transcription. | |
| annerversaries | | 1700s (middle) – 1800s (early) | VIII 238 | Arhiv HAZU | Beli (Cres) | | | | Glagolitic then Latinic. Condensation damage from being hidden during Italian rule 1918–1945. Brought to Zagreb in 1951 by Leo Košuta. | |
| annerversaries | | 1700s/1800s | | Arhiv Zadarske nadbiskupije | Žman | 318 p | 35 x 11.2 cm | 1 co | Knjiga godova. Glagolitic and Latinic. | GUZ, PB |
| blessings and curses | | 1700s/1800s | R 3378 | NSK | | 21 | | | Blagoslovi i zaklinjanja. Glagolitic and Cyrillic. | |
| abecedary | | 1700s/1800s | IX F 28 (2559) | Prague (National Museum) | | 40 | 17 x 20.5 cm | | Staré i nové tvary kyrilské a hlaholské. Cyrillic and Glagolitic alphabet tables. Scribe: Vlach. Acquired by National Museum from estate of K. J. Erben on 2 October 1872. | |
| miscellany | | 1700s/1800s | VIII 269 | Arhiv HAZU | | 13 | 27.5 x 19.5 cm | | Komad crkvenog zbornika. Acquired by Vinko Premuda of Baška, transferred by Štefanić from his remains to Arhiv JAZU in 1951. | |
| blessings and curses | | 1700s/1800s | R 33378 | NSK | Croatia | 21 | 14.1 x 9.8 cm | 1 co | Blagoslovi i zaklinjanja. Both Glagolitic and Cyrillic. | NSK |
| curses (exorcisms) | | 1700s/1800s | IV a 80/13a | Arhiv HAZU | North Dalmatia | 9 | 20.6 x 14.7 cm | | Zaklinjanja (egzorcizmi). | |
| miscellany | CČub | 1700s/1800s | R 4737 | NSK | Baška | 23 + 149 | 14 x 10 cm | | Čubranićev zbornik (Čubranić miscellany). | NSK |
| homily | | 1700s/1800s | IV a 80/32 | Arhiv HAZU | | 2 | 28 x 19.5 cm | | Propovijed o ljubavi božjoj. | |
| receipts and expenditures | | 1700s/1800s | | Arhiv Zadarske nadbiskupije | Murvica | 84 p | 28 x 10.5 cm | | Knjiga prihoda i rashoda župe Murvica. Glagolitic on pages 1–3, 5–7, 11–13, 40, 65–67, 69, 71–74, 77–78, remainder Latinic. | |
| Bogoljubne molitve prisvetome imenu Isusovu by Bartolomeo Cambi da Saluzzo | | 1700s, 1800s | R 3365 (St. sign. SM.32.F) | NSK | Croatia | 12 | 14 x 10 cm | 1 co | Bogoljubne molitve. Translated by Jiurij Malateštinić. | NSK |
| miscellany | | 1700s | IX H 6 | Prague (National Museum) | | 77 | 15.5 x 10.5 cm | | Pjesmarica Jura Marecića. Glagolitic but ff 44a-49b Latinic. | |
